= National Register of Historic Places listings in Montgomery County, New York =

Location of Montgomery County in New York

List of the National Register of Historic Places listings in Montgomery County, New York

This is intended to be a complete list of properties and districts listed on the National Register of Historic Places in Montgomery County, New York. The locations of National Register properties and districts (at least for all showing latitude and longitude coordinates below) may be seen in a map by clicking on "Map of all coordinates". Four properties are further designated National Historic Landmarks.

This National Park Service list is complete through NPS recent listings posted August 7, 2026.

Contents: Counties in New York
Albany (Albany) – Allegany – Bronx – Broome – Cattaraugus – Cayuga – Chautauqua – Chemung – Chenango – Clinton – Columbia – Cortland – Delaware – Dutchess (Poughkeepsie, Rhinebeck) – Erie (Buffalo) – Essex – Franklin – Fulton – Genesee – Greene – Hamilton – Herkimer – Jefferson – Kings – Lewis – Livingston – Madison – Monroe (Rochester) – Montgomery – Nassau – New York (Below 14th Street, 14th to 59th Streets, 59th to 110th Streets, Above 110th Street, Islands) – Niagara (Niagara Falls) – Oneida – Onondaga (Syracuse) – Ontario – Orange – Orleans – Oswego – Otsego – Putnam – Queens – Rensselaer – Richmond – Rockland – St. Lawrence – Saratoga – Schenectady – Schoharie – Schuyler – Seneca – Steuben – Suffolk – Sullivan – Tioga – Tompkins – Ulster – Warren – Washington – Wayne – Westchester (Northern, Southern, New Rochelle, Peekskill, Yonkers) – Wyoming – Yates

== Listings county-wide ==
	Name on the Register	Image	Date listed	Location	City or town	Description
1	Ames Academy Building	Ames Academy Building	January 24, 2002 (#01001496)	611 Latimer Hill Rd. 42°50′13″N 74°36′00″W	Ames	
2	Amsterdam (46th Separate Company) Armory	Amsterdam (46th Separate Company) Armory	July 1, 1994 (#94000658)	49 Florida Florida Ave. at Dewitt St., southwest corner 42°55′58″N 74°11′59″W	Amsterdam	
3	Amsterdam City Hall	Amsterdam City Hall	February 5, 2001 (#00001687)	61 Church St. 42°56′20″N 74°11′19″W	Amsterdam	
4	Amsterdam Free Library	Amsterdam Free Library	December 23, 2019 (#100004800)	28 Church St. 42°56′15″N 74°11′27″W	Amsterdam	1903 Beaux-Arts building by Albany architect Albert W. Fuller
5	Bates-Englehardt Mansion	Bates-Englehardt Mansion	December 7, 1989 (#89002091)	19 Washington St. 42°59′59″N 74°40′38″W	St. Johnsville	
6	Bragdon-Lipe House	Bragdon-Lipe House	October 5, 2005 (#05001123)	17 Otsego St. 42°54′14″N 74°34′28″W	Canajoharie	
7	Walter Butler Homestead		June 23, 1976 (#76001229)	Northeast of Fonda on Old Trail Rd. 42°57′43″N 74°21′17″W	Fonda	
8	Canajoharie Historic District	Canajoharie Historic District	May 18, 2015 (#15000233)	Roughly Church, Cliff, E. and W. Main, Mill, Moyer, Rock, and Reed Sts., and Erie Boulevard; 42°54′11″N 74°34′16″W	Canajoharie	Historic Mohawk Valley village
9	Caughnawaga Indian Village Site	Caughnawaga Indian Village Site	August 28, 1973 (#73001207)	Address Restricted; 42°57′07″N 74°23′26″W	Fonda	
10	Chalmers Knitting Mills	Chalmers Knitting Mills	February 22, 2010 (#10000028)	21-41 Bridge St. 42°56′07″N 74°11′47″W	Amsterdam	Demolished.
11	Danascara Place		December 30, 2019 (#100004819)	662 Mohawk Dr. 42°56′23″N 74°19′03″W	Tribes Hill	18th-century house of Revolutionary War veteran renovated in Italian villa style in 1870
12	Ehle House Site	Ehle House Site	June 14, 1982 (#82004780)	Address Restricted	Nelliston	
13	Peter Ehle House		September 27, 1980 (#80002655)	E. Main St. 42°55′24″N 74°36′05″W	Nelliston	
14	Enlarged Double Lock No. 33 Old Erie Canal	Enlarged Double Lock No. 33 Old Erie Canal	April 1, 2002 (#02000315)	Towpath Rd. 42°59′26″N 74°40′02″W	St. Johnsville	
15	Erie Canal	Erie Canal	October 15, 1966 (#66000530)	6 miles (9.7 km) west of Amsterdam on NY 5S; 42°56′38″N 74°16′02″W	Fort Hunter	Ruins of Erie Canal aqueduct over Schoharie Creek, and 3.5 mile segment of canal
16	First Baptist Church	First Baptist Church	January 21, 1994 (#93001546)	Polin Rd. 42°50′55″N 74°20′43″W	Charleston	
17	First Methodist Episcopal Church of St. Johnsville	First Methodist Episcopal Church of St. Johnsville	February 5, 2013 (#12001259)	5 W. Main St. 42°59′55″N 74°40′45″W	St. Johnsville	
18	Fort Johnson	Fort Johnson	November 28, 1972 (#72000858)	Junction of NY 5 and NY 67; 42°57′30″N 74°14′00″W	Fort Johnson	
19	Fort Klock	Fort Klock	November 28, 1972 (#72000859)	2 miles (3.2 km) east of St. Johnsville on NY 5; 42°59′06″N 74°39′01″W	St. Johnsville	
20	Fort Plain Conservation Area		November 15, 1979 (#79001591)	Address Restricted	Fort Plain	
21	Fort Plain Historic District	Fort Plain Historic District	August 15, 2012 (#12000510)	Roughly area around Canal & Main Sts.; also portions of Abbott, Canal, Hancock, Beck, Clyde, Douglas, Edwards, Erie, Garfield, Hancock, Henry, Herkimer, High, Main, Reid, River, Roof, State, Wagner, Webster, Willett, and Witter Sts., Clark, Clinton, Gilbert, Silk, and Waddell Aves. 42°55′51″N 74°37′22″W	Fort Plain	Second set of addresses represent a boundary increase approved October 25, 2022.
22	Frey House	Frey House	December 31, 2002 (#02001644)	NY 5; 42°54′43″N 74°35′04″W	Palatine Bridge	
23	Fultonville Historic District		August 8, 2019 (#100004242)	Generally Main St., Prospect St., Franklin St., Union St., Riverside Dr. 42°56′52″N 74°21′56″W	Fultonville	Village with many intact buildings reflecting development from early settlement through canal era and after
24	Caspar Getman Farmstead	Caspar Getman Farmstead	August 30, 2010 (#10000594)	1311 Stone Arabia Rd. 42°57′50″N 74°30′43″W	Stone Arabia	
25	Glen Historic District	Glen Historic District	August 8, 2001 (#01000844)	NY 30A, NY 161 and Logtown Rd. 42°53′40″N 74°20′33″W	Glen	
26	Gray-Jewett House	Gray-Jewett House	October 5, 2005 (#05001127)	80 Florida Ave. 42°56′01″N 74°12′00″W	Amsterdam	
27	Green Hill Cemetery		March 15, 2005 (#05000166)	Church and Cornell Sts. 42°56′16″N 74°11′05″W	Amsterdam	
28	Greene Mansion	Greene Mansion	December 31, 1979 (#79001590)	92 Market St. 42°56′24″N 74°11′27″W	Amsterdam	
29	Guy Park	Guy Park	February 6, 1973 (#73001206)	W. Main St. 42°56′49″N 74°12′36″W	Amsterdam	
30	Guy Park Avenue School	Guy Park Avenue School	June 2, 1995 (#95000669)	300 Guy Park Ave. 42°56′59″N 74°12′31″W	Amsterdam	
31	Hurricana Stock Farm		May 22, 2013 (#13000308)	NY 30; 42°57′30″N 74°11′08″W	Amsterdam	
32	Samuel and Johanna Jones Farm		May 27, 1993 (#93000460)	NY 67 west of the junction with NY 296; 42°57′51″N 74°06′29″W	Amsterdam	
33	Kilts Farmstead		September 18, 2009 (#09000721)	Address restricted	Stone Arabia	
34	Lasher-Davis House		September 27, 1980 (#80002656)	U.S. 5; 42°56′09″N 74°36′55″W	Nelliston	
35	Nellis Tavern	Nellis Tavern	May 10, 1990 (#90000685)	SR 5; 42°59′37″N 74°39′33″W	St. Johnsville	
36	Jacob Nellis Farmhouse		September 27, 1980 (#80002657)	Nellis St. 42°56′00″N 74°36′27″W	Nelliston	
37	Nelliston Historic District	Nelliston Historic District	September 27, 1980 (#80002658)	Prospect, River, Railroad and Berthoud Sts. 42°56′02″N 74°37′00″W	Nelliston	
38	Nelliston School		December 31, 2002 (#02001645)	Stone Arabia St. 42°56′08″N 74°36′49″W	Nelliston	
39	New York State Barge Canal	New York State Barge Canal	October 15, 2014 (#14000860)	Linear across county 42°56′46″N 74°12′40″W	Amsterdam, Canajoharie, Fonda, Glen, Minden, Mohawk, Palatine and St. Johnsville	Successor to Erie Canal approved by state voters in early 20th century to compete with railroads
40	Palatine Bridge Freight House		March 7, 1973 (#73001208)	East of Palatine Bridge on NY 5; 42°54′36″N 74°33′59″W	Palatine Bridge	
41	Palatine Bridge Historic District		September 6, 2019 (#100004358)	Carman Ct., Center St., Frey Dr./Ln., Grand (E&W) St., Humbert Ln., Lafayette St., Spring St., Tilton Rd. 42°54′40″N 74°34′27″W	Palatine Bridge	136-acre (55 ha) core of historic village settled by Palatine Germans in late 18th-century, with development from subsequent eras up to World War II.
42	Palatine Church	Palatine Church	January 25, 1973 (#73001209)	Mohawk Tpke. 42°58′08″N 74°37′44″W	Palatine	
43	Pawling Hall		November 15, 2002 (#02001331)	86 Pawling St. 42°58′39″N 74°09′07″W	Hagaman	
44	Margaret Reaney Memorial Library	Margaret Reaney Memorial Library	April 16, 2012 (#12000210)	19 Kingsbury Ave. 42°59′49″N 74°40′38″W	St. Johnsville	
45	Reformed Dutch Church of Stone Arabia	Reformed Dutch Church of Stone Arabia	September 14, 1977 (#77000951)	East of Nelliston on NY 10; 42°56′33″N 74°33′24″W	Nelliston	
46	Rice's Woods		July 18, 1980 (#80002654)	Address Restricted	Canajoharie	
47	John Smith Farm		January 31, 2012 (#11001061)	1059 NY 80; 42°56′08″N 74°42′17″W	Hallsville	
48	St. Johnsville Historic District		April 5, 2019 (#100003628)	Generally E. & W. Main, N. & S. Division, Bridge, Lion, Falling, Monroe, Center, Kingsbury, Church, William, Hough & Sanders Sts. 42°59′56″N 74°40′44″W	St. Johnsville	Almost the entire village included in district that documents the village's evolution from a late 18th century mill into a 19th-century industrial town
49	Saint Stanislaus Roman Catholic Church Complex	Saint Stanislaus Roman Catholic Church Complex	April 29, 1999 (#99000505)	42, 46, 50 Cornell St., 73 Reid St. 42°56′39″N 74°10′58″W	Amsterdam	
50	Smith-Voorhees-Covenhoven House		February 3, 2022 (#100007397)	141 Reynolds Rd. 42°53′03″N 74°20′34″W	Fultonville	
50	Stone Grist Mill Complex		February 23, 1996 (#96000140)	1679 Mill Rd. 43°00′17″N 74°41′47″W	St. Johnsville	
51	Samuel Sweet Canal Store	Samuel Sweet Canal Store	September 19, 1989 (#89001389)	65 Bridge St. 42°56′04″N 74°11′54″W	Amsterdam	
52	Temple of Israel	Temple of Israel	August 27, 1992 (#92001043)	8 Mohawk Pl. 42°56′22″N 74°11′41″W	Amsterdam	
53	Trinity Lutheran Church and Cemetery	Trinity Lutheran Church and Cemetery	January 5, 2005 (#04001440)	5430 NY 10; 42°56′28″N 74°33′46″W	Stone Arabia	
54	US Post Office-Amsterdam	US Post Office-Amsterdam	November 17, 1988 (#88002451)	12-16 Church St. 42°56′14″N 74°11′31″W	Amsterdam	
55	US Post Office-Canajoharie	US Post Office-Canajoharie	November 17, 1988 (#88002464)	50 W. Main St. 42°54′23″N 74°33′41″W	Canajoharie	
56	US Post Office-Fort Plain	US Post Office-Fort Plain	May 11, 1989 (#88002510)	41 River St. 42°55′54″N 74°37′23″W	Fort Plain	
57	US Post Office-St. Johnsville	US Post Office-St. Johnsville	May 11, 1989 (#88002434)	15 E. Main St. 42°59′55″N 74°40′42″W	St. Johnsville	
58	Van Alstyne House	Van Alstyne House	September 8, 1983 (#83001711)	Moyer St. 42°54′12″N 74°34′22″W	Canajoharie	
59	Van Wie Farmstead		July 14, 2011 (#11000450)	269 Brower Rd. 42°54′10″N 74°31′31″W	McKinley	
60	Vrooman Avenue School	Vrooman Avenue School	June 30, 1983 (#83001712)	Vrooman Ave. 42°56′08″N 74°10′30″W	Amsterdam	
61	Webster Wagner House	Webster Wagner House	March 7, 1973 (#73001210)	E. Grand St. 42°54′39″N 74°34′10″W	Palatine Bridge	
62	Walrath-Van Horne House	Walrath-Van Horne House	September 27, 1980 (#80002659)	W. Main St. 42°56′29″N 74°37′08″W	Nelliston	
63	Waterman-Gramps House		September 27, 1980 (#80002660)	School St. 42°56′13″N 74°36′45″W	Nelliston	
64	West Hill School	West Hill School	April 11, 2002 (#02000359)	3 Otsego St. 42°54′17″N 74°34′25″W	Canajoharie	
65	Windfall Dutch Barn		November 22, 2000 (#00001411)	Clinton Rd. at the junction with Ripple Rd. 42°51′32″N 74°44′40″W	Salt Springville	

== See also ==
- List of National Historic Landmarks in New York
- National Register of Historic Places listings in New York
- Schoharie Crossing State Historic Site
