= Palatine, New York =

- Town
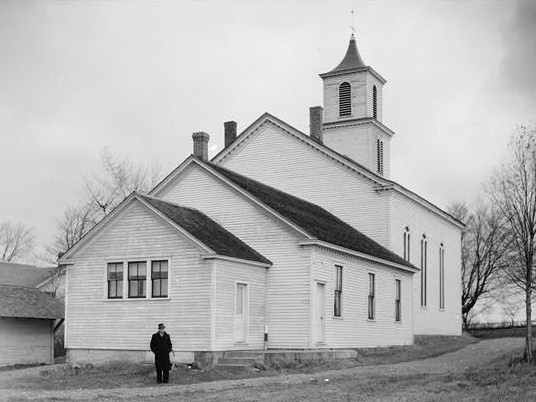
- Trinity Lutheran Church in Stone Arabia (1936)

- Location in Montgomery County and the state of New York
- Coordinates: 42°57′0″N 74°33′46″W
- Country: United States
- State: New York
- County: Montgomery

Government
  - Type: Town council
  - Town supervisor: Sara Nicoli
  - Town council: Members' list: • Niel Yerdon; • Christopher Novak; • Betty Sanders; • Hank Vandenburgh

Area
  - Total: 41.70 sq mi (108.00 km^{2})
  - Land: 41.07 sq mi (106.37 km^{2})
  - Water: 0.63 sq mi (1.63 km^{2})
- Elevation: 778 ft (237 m)

Population (2020)
  - Total: 3,189
  - Density: 77.6/sq mi (30.0/km^{2})
- Time zone: UTC-5 (Eastern (EST))
  - Summer (DST): UTC-4 (EDT)
- ZIP Codes: 13410 (Nelliston); 13428 (Palatine Bridge); 13339 (Fort Plain); 13452 (St. Johnsville)
- FIPS code: 36-56099
- GNIS feature ID: 0979337
- Website: townofpalatine.org

Palatine is a town in Montgomery County, New York, United States. It is located on the north side of the Mohawk River in the northwestern part of the county. The population was 3,189 at the 2020 census. The name is derived from the Palatinate region in the Rhineland, the homeland of the Germans who were the earliest European settlers of this region. Administrative offices of the town are located in Palatine Bridge.

== History ==
Settlers in the area in the mid-18th century were primarily Palatines, Germans from the Palatinate region. Suffering from French raids in their native territory, they had become refugees. Queen Anne of England arranged for the transport of several thousand Palatines to the colony in 1710 and later; they first worked in camps run by the English along the Hudson River to pay off the cost of passage.

The Palatines built the Palatine Church in 1770, which still holds Lutheran services. It was listed on the National Register of Historic Places in 1973.

The town was formed in 1788 after the Revolutionary War from the "Palatine District" in the newly organized Montgomery County. In 1797, part of the town was used to form the town of Salisbury (now in Herkimer County). The formation of other towns that eventually were in adjacent counties further reduced Palatine in size. The town of St. Johnsville was created from Palatine in Montgomery County.

== Geography ==
Palatine is in western Montgomery County, bordered to the north by Fulton County, to the east by the town of Mohawk, to the northwest by the town of St. Johnsville, and to the south and west by the Mohawk River. The village of Palatine Bridge is along the Mohawk and the southern town line, and the village of Nelliston is further west along the Mohawk. The village of Canajoharie borders Palatine to the south across the Mohawk.

New York State Route 5 runs through the town, following the Mohawk River and passing through Palatine Bridge and Nelliston. It leads east (downriver) 11 miles (18 km) to Fonda, the Montgomery county seat, and northwest (upriver) 9 miles (14 km) to St. Johnsville and 18 miles (29 km) to Little Falls. State Route 10 crosses the center of Palatine, passes through Palatine Bridge, and leads north 19 miles (31 km) to Caroga Lake and south through Canajoharie village 11 miles (18 km) to Sharon Springs. State Route 67 crosses the northwest corner of the town, leading east 10 miles (16 km) to Johnstown and west 8 miles (13 km) to St. Johnsville.

According to the U.S. Census Bureau, the town of Palatine has a total area of 41.7 square miles (108 km^{2}), of which 41.1 square miles (106 km^{2}) are land and 0.6 square miles (1.6 km^{2}), or 1.51%, are water. The town is drained by south-flowing tributaries of the Mohawk River, most notably Caroga Creek in the west and Knauderack Creek in the east.

== Demographics ==
Historical population
Census	Pop.	Note	%±
1820	3,936		—
1830	2,745		−30.3%
1840	2,823		2.8%
1850	2,856		1.2%
1860	2,605		−8.8%
1870	2,814		8.0%
1880	2,786		−1.0%
1890	2,871		3.1%
1900	2,569		−10.5%
1910	2,517		−2.0%
1920	2,232		−11.3%
1930	2,287		2.5%
1940	2,420		5.8%
1950	2,529		4.5%
1960	2,556		1.1%
1970	2,711		6.1%
1980	2,819		4.0%
1990	2,787		−1.1%
2000	3,061		9.8%
2010	3,240		5.8%
2020	3,189		−1.6%
U.S. Decennial Census

As of the census of 2000, there were 3,070 people, 1,135 households, and 812 families residing in the town. The population density was 74.5 inhabitants per square mile (28.8/km^{2}). There were 1,233 housing units at an average density of 29.9 per square mile (11.5/km^{2}). The racial makeup of the town was 97.82% White, 0.62% African American, 0.26% Native American, 0.52% Asian, 0.07% from other races, and 0.72% from two or more races. Hispanic or Latino of any race were 0.49% of the population.

There were 1,135 households, out of which 31.5% had children under the age of 18 living with them, 57.7% were married couples living together, 9.0% had a female householder with no husband present, and 28.4% were non-families. 24.5% of all households were made up of individuals, and 12.1% had someone living alone who was 65 years of age or older. The average household size was 2.64 and the average family size was 3.10.

In the town, the population was spread out, with 26.4% under the age of 18, 7.2% from 18 to 24, 26.7% from 25 to 44, 21.3% from 45 to 64, and 18.4% who were 65 years of age or older. The median age was 39 years. For every 100 females, there were 92.7 males. For every 100 females age 18 and over, there were 91.1 males.

The median income for a household in the town was $33,415, and the median income for a family was $40,284. Males had a median income of $27,745 versus $22,978 for females. The per capita income for the town was $17,416. About 6.9% of families and 11.5% of the population were below the poverty line, including 18.1% of those under age 18 and 7.3% of those age 65 or over.

== Communities and locations in Palatine ==
- Big Nose – A landmark at the town line in the southeastern part of Palatine. Along with "Little Nose" on the opposite bank of the Mohawk River, it marks a place called "The Noses".
- Christmans Corners – A location in the northern section of the town.
- Cook Corners – A hamlet south of Stone Arabia on Route 10 at the intersection with Dillenbeck Road.
- Cranes Landing – A former community in the western part of the town.
- East Stone Arabia – A hamlet east of Stone Arabia. Location of Salem United Methodist Church of East Stone Arabia. Historical location of School Number 6.
- McKinley – A location in the southeastern part of the town. The Van Wie Farmstead was added to the National Register of Historic Places in 2011.
- Nelliston – A village on the Mohawk River, opposite Fort Plain.
- Palatine Bridge – A village on the Mohawk River, opposite Canajoharie. The Frey House, Palatine Bridge Freight House, and Webster Wagner House are listed on the National Register of Historic Places.
- Palatine Church – A former community in the northwestern portion of the town.
- Stone Arabia – A hamlet on Route 10, northeast of Palatine Bridge. Home to a large Amish community. Location of the Trinity Lutheran Church and Cemetery and the nearby Reformed Dutch Church of Stone Arabia. Site of Fort Paris and of a minor battle of the American Revolution called the Battle of Stone Arabia (1780).
