= Ehle =

Ehle may refer to:

- Ehle (river), in Saxony-Anhalt, Germany
- Airport code for Lelystad Airport in The Netherlands
- Ehle House Site, an archaeological site at Nelliston in Montgomery County, New York
- Peter Ehle House, a historic home located at Nelliston in Montgomery County, New York

== People with that surname ==
- John Walter Ehle (1873–1927), Fireman First Class serving in the United States Navy during the Spanish–American War
- John Ehle (1925–2018), U.S. writer
- Jennifer Ehle (born 1969), British-U.S. actress, daughter of John Ehle
- Ricardo Ehle (born 1984), Brazilian footballer
