= Nellis =

Nellis may refer to:

== People ==
- Alice Nellis (born 1971), Czech filmmaker
- Duane Nellis (born 1954), American educator and Ohio University president
- John Nellis (born 1993), Northern Irish social media personality
- Joseph L. Nellis, Washington attorney involved in various government investigations into organized crime in America
- William Harrell Nellis (1916-1944), World War II fighter pilot, after whom the Air Force base is named
- William J. Nellis (born 1941), American physicist

== Places in the United States ==
- Nellis, West Virginia, an unincorporated community
- Nellis Air Force Base, Nevada
  - Federal Prison Camp, Nellis, a United States federal minimum-security prison, on the base
- Jacob Nellis Farmhouse, a historic farmhouse in Montgomery County, New York
- Nellis Tavern, a historic tavern in Montgomery County, New York
- Nellis Historic District, Boone County, West Virginia

== See also ==
- Edna Neillis (1953–2015), Scottish footballer
- Nelis, a surname and given name
- Nelles
- Nelli (disambiguation)
