= Nelissen =

Nelissen is a Dutch patronymic surname ("Nelis' son"). Nelis is a short form of the given name Cornelis. The name is most common in Dutch and Belgian Limburg. Among variant forms of the surname are Neelissen, Nelisse, Nelis, Nellis, and Nelles. Notable people with the surname include:

== Nelissen ==
- Arthur Nelissen (1879–1922), Dutch eclectic architect active in Belgium
- Danny Nelissen (born 1970), Dutch former professional road bicycle racer and former
- Jean Nelissen (1936–2010), Dutch sports journalist and commentator
- Mark Nelissen (born 1950), Belgian evolutionary biologist
- Roelof Nelissen (1931–2019), Dutch KVP politician, Deputy Prime Minister 1971–73
- Wilfried Nelissen (born 1970), Belgian road racing cyclist

== Neelissen ==
- Catharina Neelissen (born 1961), Dutch Olympic rower

== Nelisse or Nélisse ==
- Isabelle Nélisse (born 2003), Canadian actress, sister of Sophie
- Robin Nelisse (born 1978), Dutch football forward playing for the Netherlands Antilles
- Sophie Nélisse (born 2000), Canadian actress, sister of Isabelle
