= Nélisse =

Nélisse is a surname. Notable people with the surname include:

- Isabelle Nélisse (born 2003), Canadian actress, sister of Sophie
- Robin Nelisse (born 1978), Netherlands Antillean footballer
- Sophie Nélisse (born 2000), Canadian actress, sister of Isabelle

== See also ==
- Nelissen
