= Dutch barn =

Type of barn

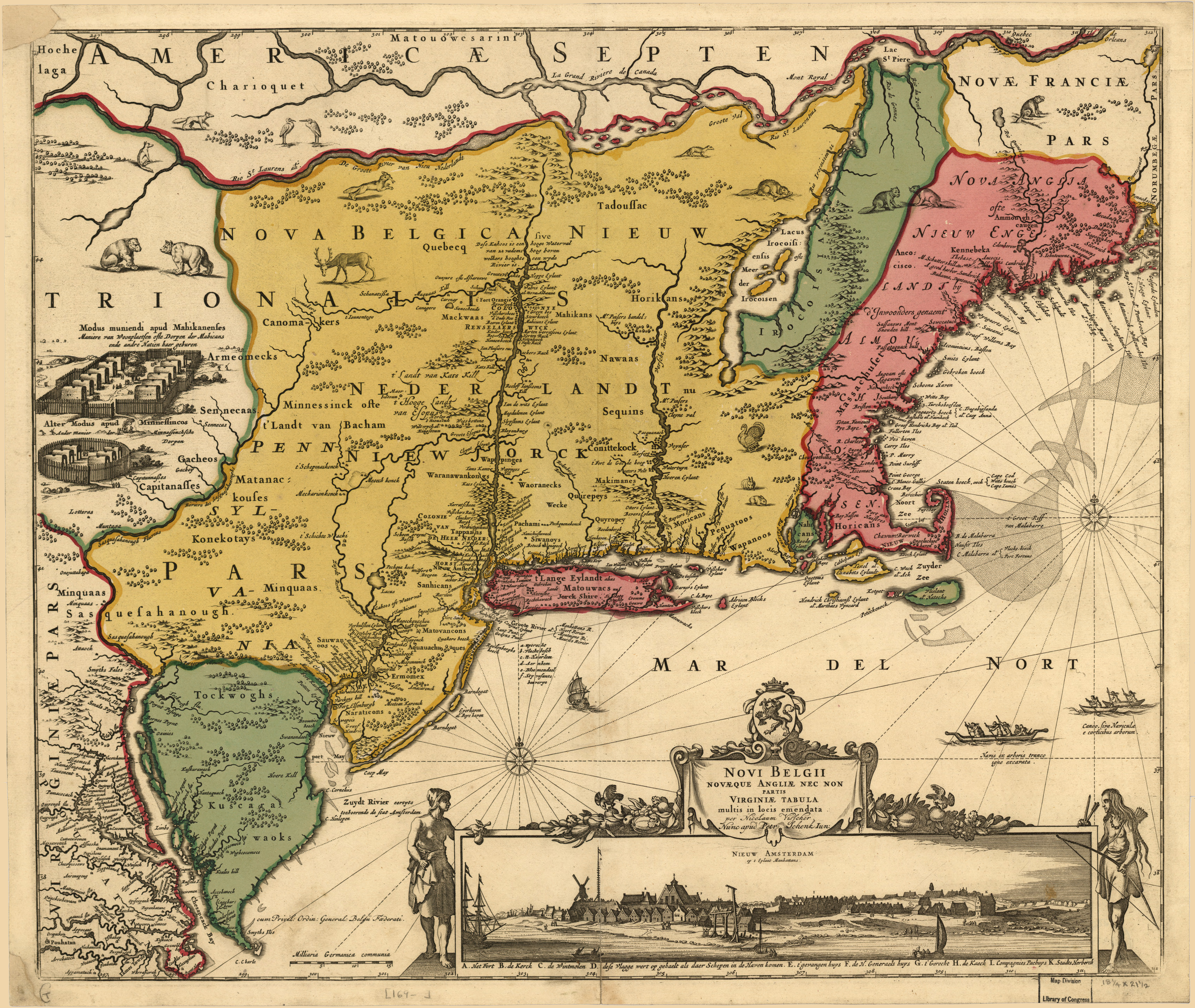
Map of New Netherland dated 1685 - where the greatest numbers of Dutch barns were built in what is now New Jersey

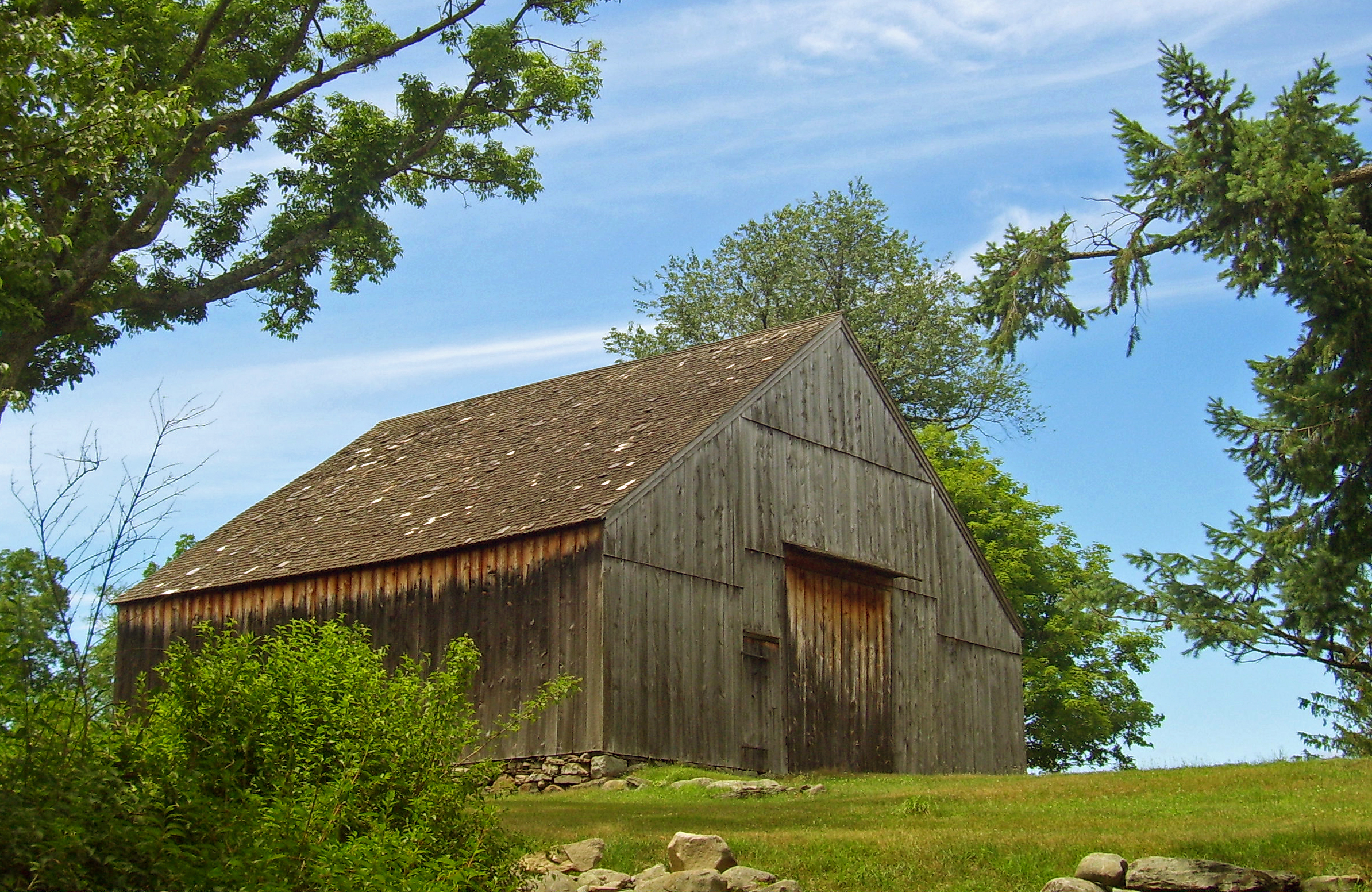
A New World Dutch barn known as the Bull Barn located at the Bull Stone House in Hamptonburgh, NY. This barn has the oldest known barn timbers in its core dated to 1726 but the roof structure, side aisles and exterior are not original.

Dutch barn is the name given to markedly different types of barns in the United States and Canada, and in the United Kingdom. In the United States, Dutch barns (a. k. a. New World Dutch barns) represent the oldest and rarest types of barns. There are relatively few—probably fewer than 600—of these barns still intact. Common features of these barns include a core structure composed of a steep gabled roof, supported by purlin plates and anchor beam posts, the floor and stone piers below. Little of the weight is supported by the curtain wall, which could be removed without affecting the stability of the structure. Large beams of pine or oak bridge the center aisle for animals to provide room for threshing. Entry was through paired doors on the gable ends with a pent roof over them, and smaller animal doors at the corners of the same elevations. The Dutch Barn has a square profile, unlike the more rectangular English or German barns. In the United Kingdom a structure called a Dutch barn is a relatively recent agricultural development meant specifically for hay and straw storage; most examples were built from the 19th century. British Dutch barns represent a type of pole barn in common use today. Design styles range from fixed roof to adjustable roof; some Dutch barns have honeycombed brick walls, which provide ventilation and are decorative as well. Still other British Dutch barns may be found with no walls at all, much like American pole barns.

== In the United States ==
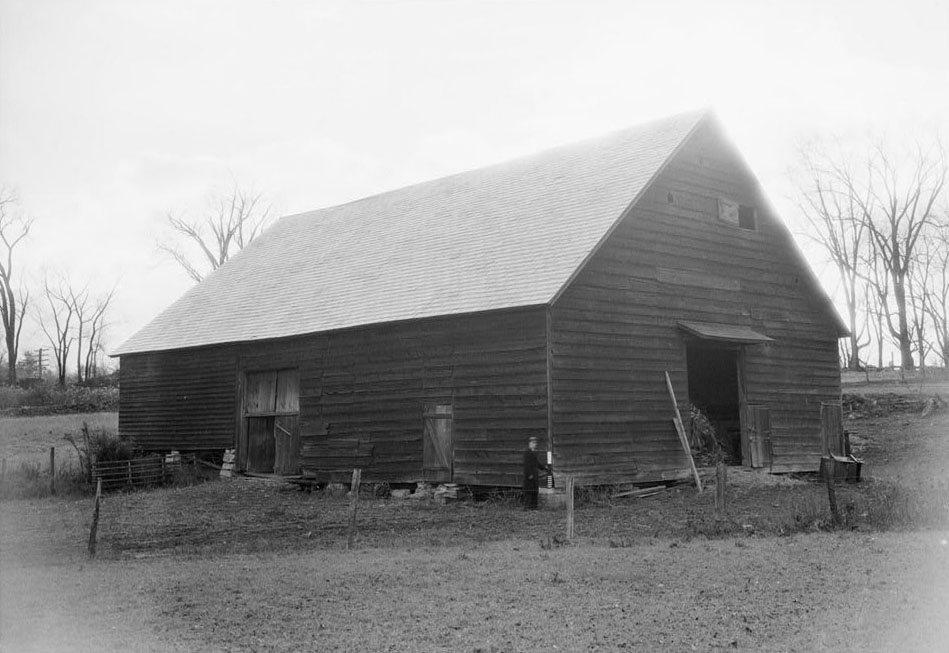
Dilapidated Dutch barn in upstate New York recorded by the Historic American Buildings Survey in 1937

The New World Dutch barn is the rarest of the American barn forms. The remaining American Dutch-style barns represent relics from the 18th and 19th centuries. Dutch barns were the first great barns built in the United States, mostly by Dutch settlers in New Netherlands.

New Netherlanders settled along the Hackensack, Passaic, Raritan, Millstone rivers and their tributaries in New Jersey. In New York, they concentrated in the Hudson Valley, and along the Mohawk River and Schoharie Creek .

Many Dutch barns also were built in other portions of the American Northeast.

=== History ===
Relatively few—probably fewer than 600—Dutch barns survive intact in the 21st century. Those that remain date from the 18th and early 19th century. Dutch barns rarely remain in a good, unaltered condition. The Dutch Barn Preservation Society has cataloged hundreds of standing Dutch Barns throughout the Hudson, Mohawk, and Schoharie Valleys as well as in New Jersey. Schoharie County Historian Harold Zoch regularly speaks on Dutch barns.

=== Examples ===
New World Dutch Barns in the National Register of Historic Places include the Wortendyke Barn, Windfall Dutch Barn, and an example at the Caspar Getman Farmstead.

=== Design ===
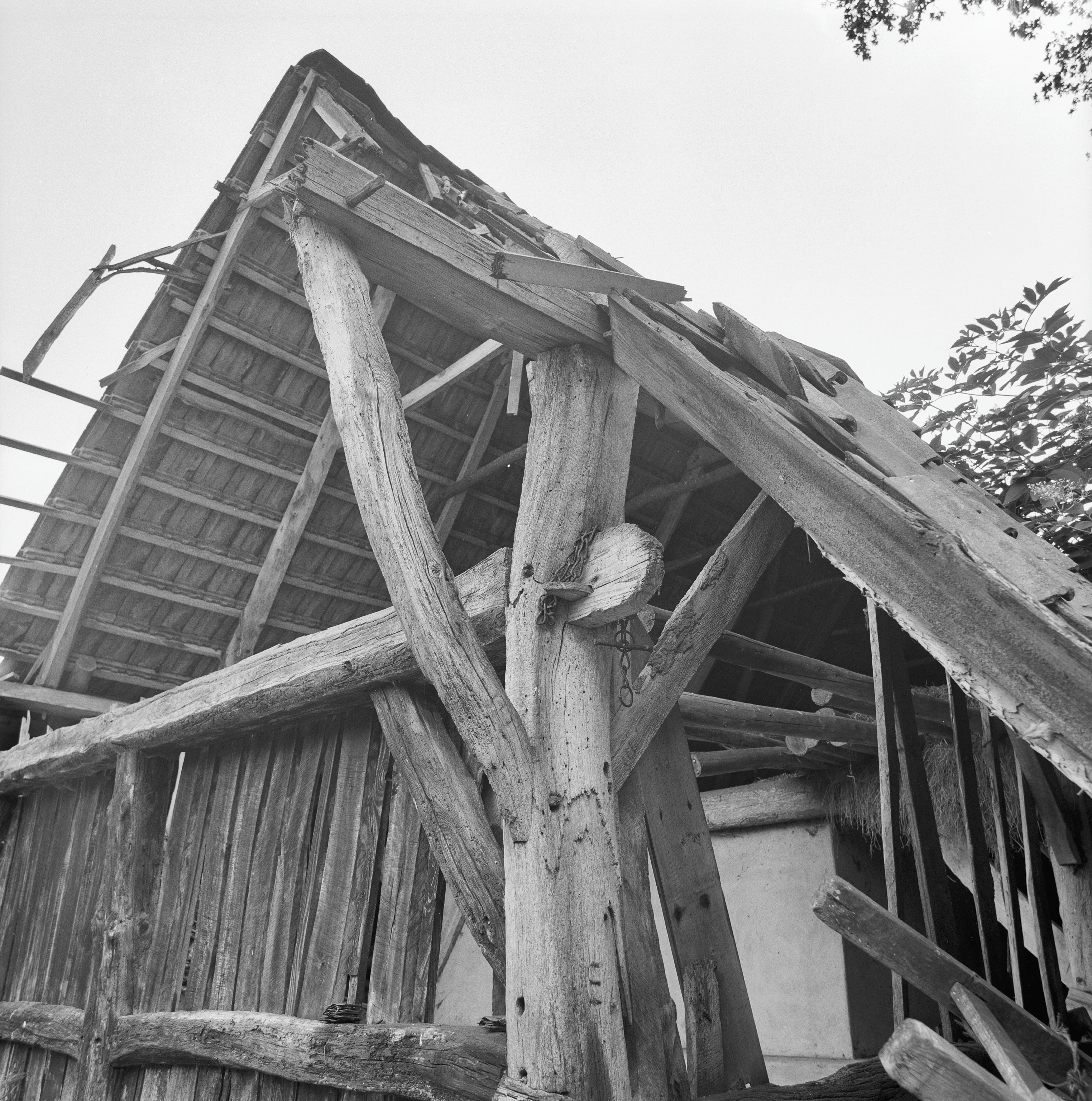
The large beam with a tenon protruding through the post is called an anchor beam. This image is of a barn in the Netherlands, but anchor beams in North America are very similar. (Nutter - 20170459 - RCE)

The exterior features a broad gable roof, which, in early Dutch barns extended very low to the ground. The barns feature center doors for wagons on the narrow end. A pent roof, or a pentice, over the doors offered some protection from inclement weather. The siding was usually horizontal and had few details. Dutch barns often lacked windows and had no openings other than the doors and holes for purple martins to enter. The design of the Dutch barn allows it to have a massive presence, giving it an appearance larger by comparison to other barns.

Inside the barns are supported by heavy structural systems. The mortised and tenoned and pegged beams are arranged in "H-shaped" units. The design alludes to cathedral interiors with columned aisles along a central interior space, used in Dutch barns for threshing. It is this design that links Dutch barns to the Old World barns of Europe. Another distinctive feature of the Dutch barn is that the ends of the cross beams protrude through the columns. These protrusions are often rounded to form tongues. This feature is not found in any other style of barn design.

=== Distribution ===
The Dutch barn was widely distributed in areas of New Jersey and New York. Dutch barns have been identified in southwestern Michigan, Illinois, and Kentucky in the United States Midwest. The Illinois and Kentucky examples may have been misidentified when recorded, and might have been Midwest three portal barns instead. However, New Jersey Dutch are documented as having settled in Henry and Mercer counties in Kentucky so there may be reason to believe that the barns in Kentucky may actually be Dutch Barns. Further research is warranted.

== In Canada ==
North of Toronto, Ontario, Dutch barns were found in the Dutch settled areas.

== In the United Kingdom ==
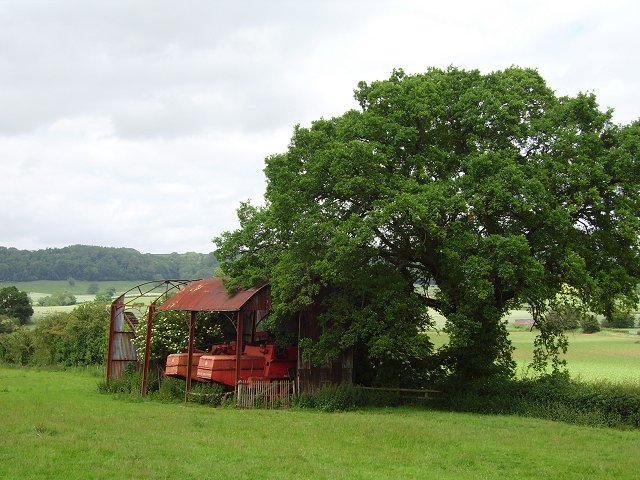
An example of a decaying British Dutch barn, with part of the roof missing

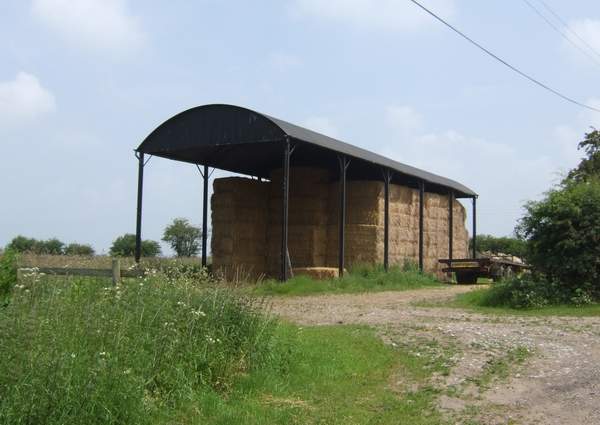
A British Dutch barn in Shropshire

What are called Dutch barns in the United Kingdom are sometimes called a hay barrack in the U.S., a specific type of barn developed for the storage of hay. They have a roof, but no walls. These are a relatively recent development in the history of British farm architecture, most examples dating from the 19th century. Nowadays they are more commonly used to store straw. They also are called pole barns and hay barns.

=== History ===
Early barn types in the U.K., such as aisled barns, were primarily used for the processing and temporary storage of grain. Processing comprised hand-threshing (later in history replaced by machine threshing): the grain would then be removed to a granary for permanent storage. Following the agricultural revolution of the 16th to mid-19th century, with its emphasis on the improvement of farming techniques, there was a marked increase in the amount of hay that was produced (partly due to the use of water-meadows and partly due to crop rotation). The hay barn was developed in response to this: formerly the small amounts of precious hay produced had been stored in the haylofts over the cow house or stables, or in haystacks. However, haystacks are prone to spoiling in the rain, especially after the stack has been 'opened' for consumption. As the weather in the U.K. is often wet, several different types of hay barns evolved, but all shared certain characteristics: they were roofed and well-ventilated. Hay barns came into use at the end of the 18th century. Dutch barns are still very common in the U.K., and are nowadays most commonly used to store straw rather than hay.

=== Design ===
Various types of hay barn included those with 'honeycombed' brick walls, forming a decorative as well as practical form of ventilation, and the Dutch barn, which has a roof but open sides. The roof kept off the rain but the lack of walls allowed good ventilation around the hay and prevented spoiling.

The term 'Dutch barn' has been used in the U.K. both to describe such structures with fixed roofs and those with adjustable roofs. The latter type are also, confusingly, sometimes called French barns. Due to their ease of construction these structures are often considered temporary and appear and disappear in the landscape; the interval is often determined by the life of the pole upright or the corrugated iron roof. They are often constructed with a rounded or arched corrugated iron roof and with metal uprights, although frequently, telegraph poles are used for the uprights.
