= Guy Park Avenue School =

- U.S. National Register of Historic Places
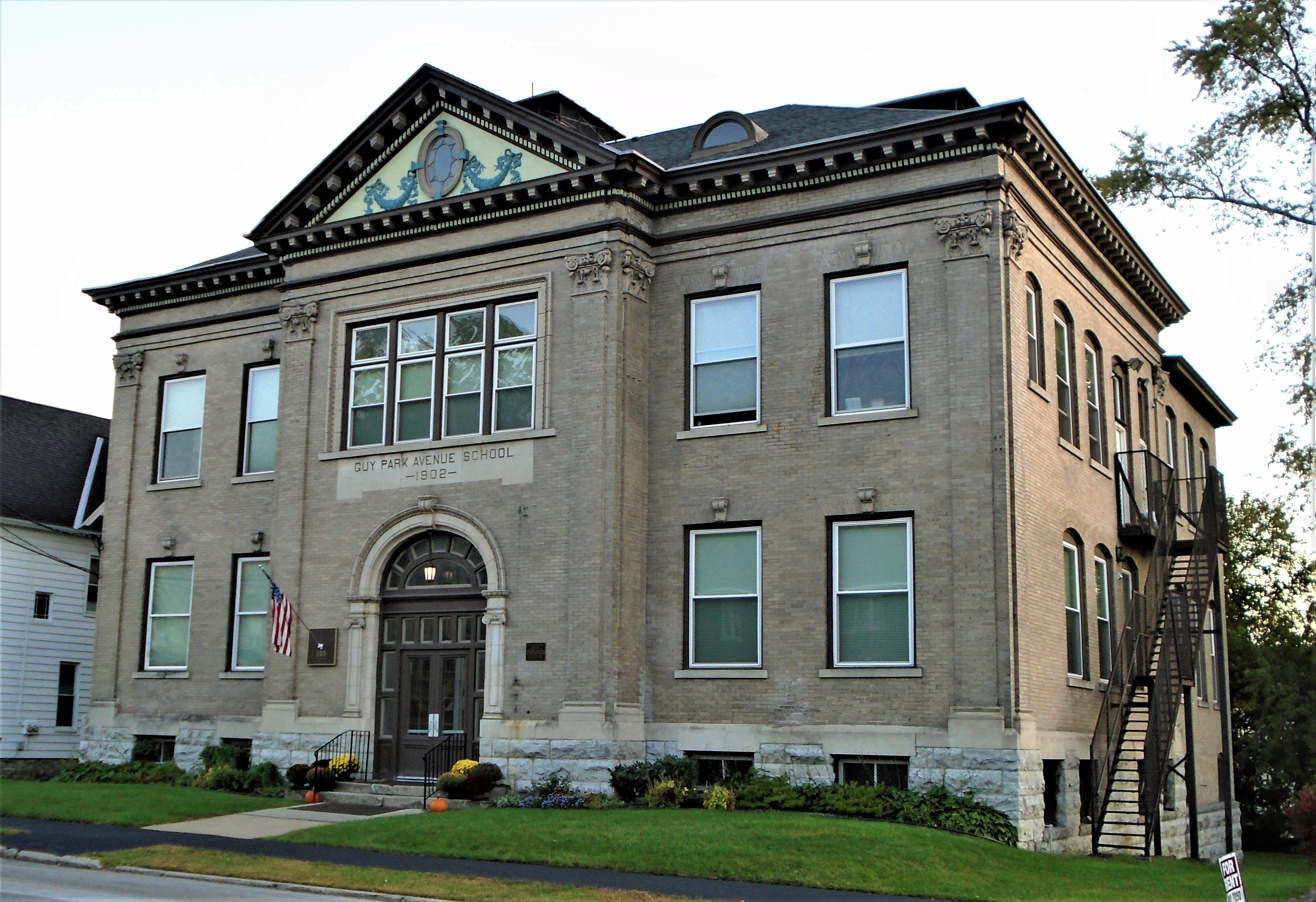
- (2020)

- Location within New York Location within the United States
- Location: 300 Guy Park Ave., Amsterdam, New York
- Coordinates: 42°56′59″N 74°12′31″W
- Built: 1902
- Architect: Bernard Machold
- Architectural style: Classical Revival
- NRHP reference No.: 95000669
- Added to NRHP: June 2, 1995

The Guy Park Avenue School is a historic school building located at 300 Guy Park Avenue in Amsterdam, Montgomery County, New York. It was built in 1902 and is a two-story, square brick building on a raised stone foundation. It features a round arched entrance portal of cast stone and a triangular pediment highlighted by an oculus and wag ornamentation. It ceased use as a school in 1968.

From 1968 to 2001 it housed the Walter Elwood Museum, with exhibits about local history and culture. The museum later moved to the nearby Guy Park mansion, also a historic site. The old school is now an apartment building.

The building was added to the National Register of Historic Places in 1995.
