= John Smith Farm =

- Slate Creek Farm John Smith Patentee
- U.S. National Register of Historic Places
- U.S. Historic district
- Location within New York Location within the United States
- Location: 1059 NY 80, near Hallsville, New York
- Coordinates: 42°56′08″N 74°42′17″W
- Area: 199 acres (81 ha)
- Built: c. 1834, c. 1865
- Architectural style: Greek Revival, Italian Villa
- NRHP reference No.: 11001061
- Added to NRHP: January 31, 2012

Slate Creek Farm, is a National Landmark and consists of a 199 acre U.S.D.A. Certified Organic Farmstead including the original Manor House and related farm outbuildings all of which are listed on both the New York State and the National Register of Historic Places.

It is located in the Erie Canalway National Heritage Corridor in Hallsville, Montgomery County, New York. It includes the Farm's original Manor House, a large Dairy Bank Barn (c. 1834), a carriage house and granary (c. 1834), a Victorian chicken house, several corn cribs, a hog pen, a scale house with the adjoining Farm Manager's home.

The Manor House was built in about 1834, and consists of a two-story, Italianate style brick main block, with a two-story rear service wing added in or about 1865.

John Smith the original patentee developed his farmstead in the heart of the Mohawk Valley on Otsquago Creek in 1834. It stands today as an example of a prosperous farm in the 19th century.

It was added to the National Register of Historic Places in 2012.
