= Caspar Getman Farmstead =

- U.S. National Register of Historic Places
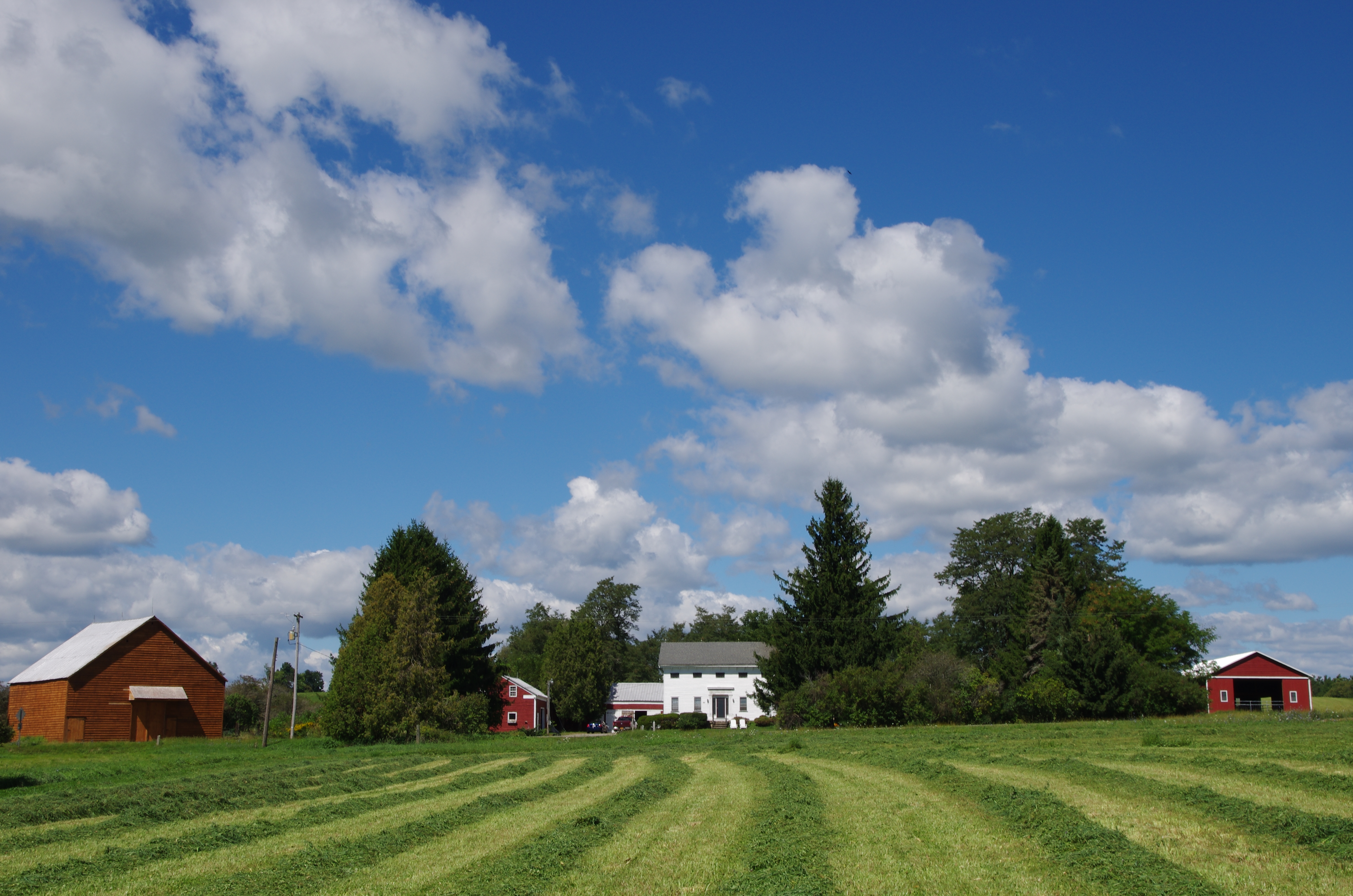

- Location within New York Location within the United States
- Location: 1311 Stone Arabia Rd., near Stone Arabia, New York
- Coordinates: 42°57′50″N 74°30′43″W
- Area: 95.14 acres (38.50 ha)
- Built: c. 1790
- NRHP reference No.: 10000594
- Added to NRHP: August 30, 2010

Caspar Getman Farmstead is a historic home and related farm outbuildings located near Stone Arabia in Montgomery County, New York. It includes the main house and ell, two lateral-entry English barns, a New World Dutch barn (c. 1790), limestone smokehouse (c. 1850), and former chicken coop (c. 1920). The house has a two-story main block, five by five bay, with a center entrance, with an attached 1 1/2-story ell. It has a moderately pitched gable roof and is clad in clapboards.

It was added to the National Register of Historic Places in 2010.
