= Walter Elwood Museum =

Coordinates: 42.9396°N 74.1849°W

The Walter Elwood Museum is a museum of local history in Amsterdam, New York. The museum is currently located in at 100 Church Street in the former Noteworthy Complex and historic Sanford & Sons Carpet Mills building.

The museum was founded in 1939 by Walter Elwood, a local history teacher, who began collecting local artifacts in the 1930s. The museum features interactive exhibits of local history, including area industry and textile mills, politics, the Victorian era and natural history. Collections include buttons, objects crafted by the Mohawk, hand-made doll clothes, glass teaching slides, political buttons, and fossils and shells.

The museum has been housed in several locations in Amsterdam over time, including the Fifth Ward School, then the Guy Park Avenue School, and then the Guy Park Manor in 2009. In 2011, damage from Hurricane Irene forced the museum to close until a new home could be found. The museum opened in its current location in 2013.
