= Nelliston, New York =

- Village
- Location within New York Location within the United States
- Coordinates: 42°56′1″N 74°36′49″W
- Country: United States
- State: New York
- County: Montgomery
- Town: Palatine

Area
  - Total: 1.20 sq mi (3.10 km^{2})
  - Land: 1.10 sq mi (2.86 km^{2})
  - Water: 0.089 sq mi (0.23 km^{2})
- Elevation: 367 ft (112 m)

Population (2020)
  - Total: 555
  - Density: 502.4/sq mi (193.97/km^{2})
- Time zone: UTC-5 (Eastern (EST))
  - Summer (DST): UTC-4 (EDT)
- ZIP Codes: 13410 (Nelliston); 13339 (Fort Plain); 13428 (Palatine Bridge)
- Area code: 518
- FIPS code: 36-49748
- GNIS feature ID: 0958362
- Website: www.nelliston.org

Nelliston is a village in Montgomery County, New York, United States. The population was 555 at the 2020 census. The name is from members of the Nellis family.

Nelliston is in the town of Palatine and is west of Amsterdam.

The Erie Canal passes the village.

== History ==
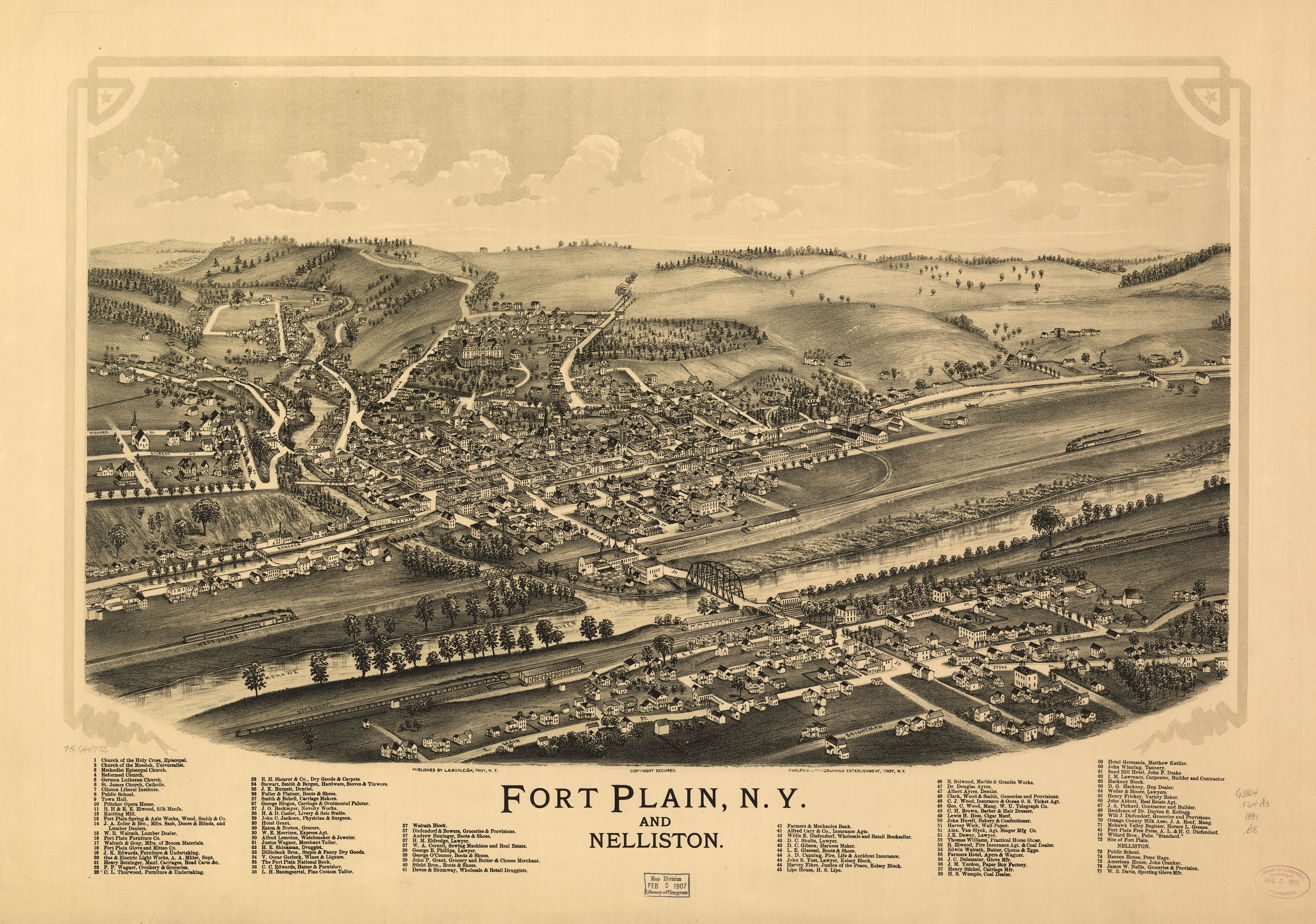
Perspective map of Fort Plain, New York, and Nelliston with list of landmarks published by L.R. Burleigh in 1891

Andrew Nellis, founder of the Nellis family in the area, came to what is now the town of Palatine in 1722. Fort Fox and Fort Wagner were built at this location during the late colonial period. The village was not well-developed until the time of the Civil War.

The Lasher-Davis House, Ehle House Site, Peter Ehle House, Reformed Dutch Church of Stone Arabia, Jacob Nellis Farmhouse, Nelliston School, Waterman-Gramps House, Walrath-Van Horne House, and Nelliston Historic District are listed on the National Register of Historic Places.

== Geography ==
Nelliston is located in western Montgomery County at 42°56′1″N 74°36′49″W (42.933644, -74.613531). It sits on the northeast side of the Mohawk River across from the village of Fort Plain and the New York State Thruway.

New York State Route 5 passes through Nelliston as its Main Street. The highway, following the Mohawk River, leads east 24 miles (39 km) to Amsterdam and northwest 16 miles (26 km) to Little Falls. New York State Route 80 has its northern terminus at NY 5 in the village. NY-80 leads west through Fort Plain and then southwest to Cooperstown, 28 miles (45 km) distant.

According to the U.S. Census Bureau, the village of Nelliston has a total area of 1.20 square miles (3.11 km^{2}), of which 1.11 square miles (2.87 km^{2}) are land and 0.09 square miles (0.23 km^{2}), or 7.53%, are water. The water area is within the Mohawk River, here part of the Erie Canal.

== Demographics ==
Historical population
Census	Pop.	Note	%±
1880	558		—
1890	721		29.2%
1900	634		−12.1%
1910	737		16.2%
1920	664		−9.9%
1930	553		−16.7%
1940	638		15.4%
1950	693		8.6%
1960	729		5.2%
1970	716		−1.8%
1980	691		−3.5%
1990	569		−17.7%
2000	622		9.3%
2010	596		−4.2%
2020	555		−6.9%
U.S. Decennial Census

As of the census of 2000, there were 622 people, 257 households, and 172 families residing in the village. The population density was 565.0 inhabitants per square mile (218.1/km^{2}). There were 281 housing units at an average density of 255.3 per square mile (98.6/km^{2}). The racial makeup of the village was 97.75% White, 0.96% Native American, 0.16% Asian, and 1.13% from two or more races. Hispanic or Latino of any race were 0.64% of the population.

There were 257 households, out of which 26.8% had children under the age of 18 living with them, 51.4% were married couples living together, 10.9% had a female householder with no husband present, and 32.7% were non-families. 29.2% of all households were made up of individuals, and 14.8% had someone living alone who was 65 years of age or older. The average household size was 2.42 and the average family size was 2.91.

In the village, the population was spread out, with 24.0% under the age of 18, 7.4% from 18 to 24, 27.7% from 25 to 44, 21.5% from 45 to 64, and 19.5% who were 65 years of age or older. The median age was 41 years. For every 100 females, there were 93.8 males. For every 100 females age 18 and over, there were 91.5 males.

The median income for a household in the village was $31,544, and the median income for a family was $35,875. Males had a median income of $26,500 versus $20,375 for females. The per capita income for the village was $15,002. About 6.4% of families and 9.8% of the population were below the poverty line, including 8.7% of those under age 18 and 8.3% of those age 65 or over.

== Notable people ==
- Bill Dahlen, major league baseball player
