= Webster Wagner House =

Historic house in New York, United States

- U.S. National Register of Historic Places
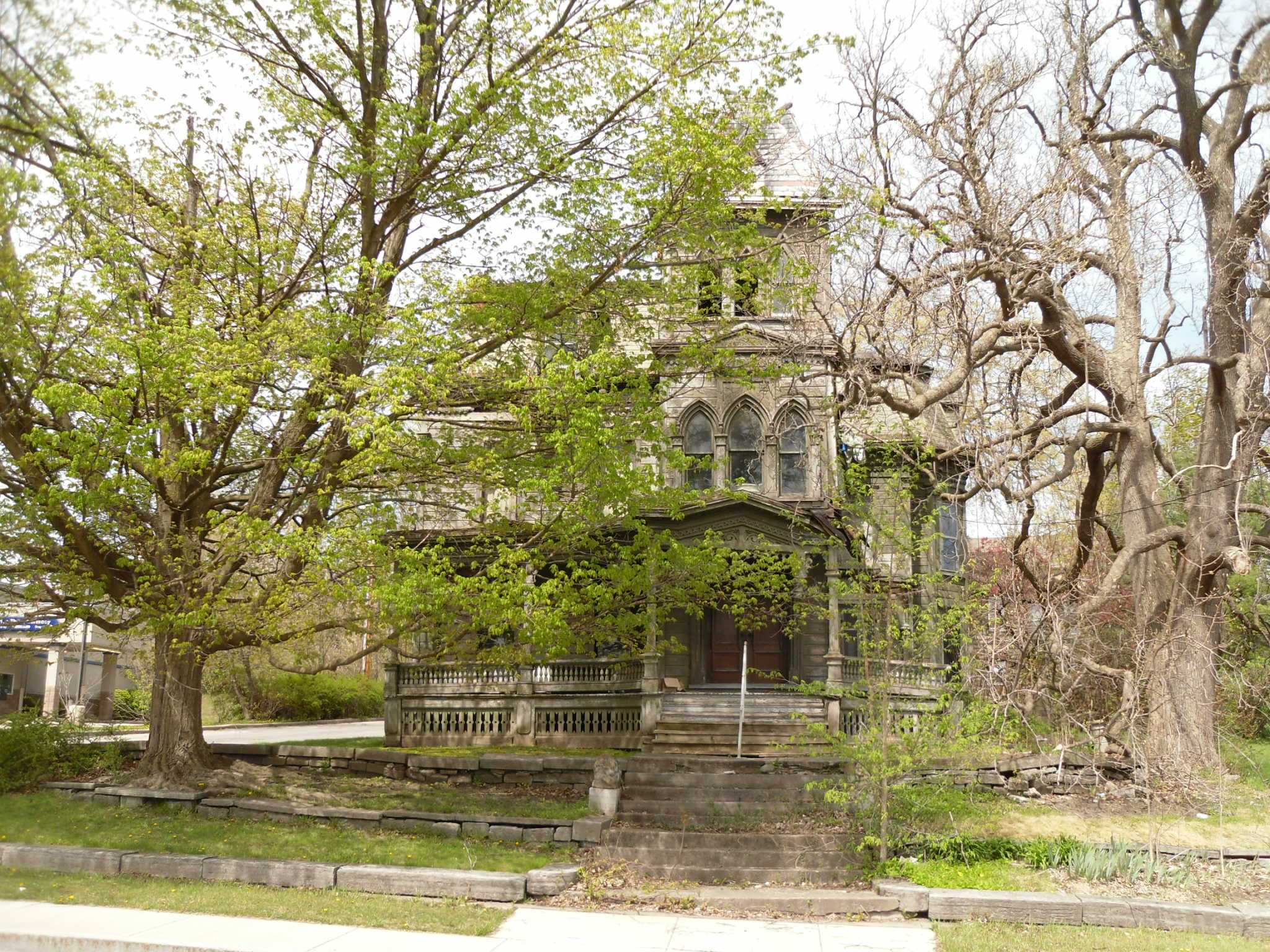
- Webster Wagner House, April 2010

- Location within New York Location within the United States
- Location: E. Grand St., Palatine Bridge, New York
- Coordinates: 42°54′39″N 74°34′10″W
- Area: 1 acre (0.40 ha)
- Built: 1876
- Architect: Horatio Nelson White
- NRHP reference No.: 73001210
- Added to NRHP: March 7, 1973

Webster Wagner House was a historic home located at Palatine Bridge in Montgomery County, New York. It was built in 1876 and designed by architect Horatio Nelson White (1814–1892) as the home for railroad car magnate Webster Wagner (1817–1882). It consisted of a 2 1/2-story main block with a 2-story rear service wing. It featured a 3-story entrance tower at the southeast corner.

It was added to the National Register of Historic Places in 1973. The home was a victim of demolition by neglect.

== See also ==
- Rail Car Grand Isle: A preserved Wagner Palace car
- National Register of Historic Places listings in Montgomery County, New York
