= Nelis =

Nelis is a Dutch masculine given name, a short form of the given name Cornelis, and a patronymic surname derived from it. Notable people with this name include:

Given name

- Nelis van Dijk (1904–1969), Dutch boxer

Surname

- Manke Nelis ("Limping Nelis") (1919–1993), stage name of one-legged Dutch singer Cornelis Pieters
- André Nelis (1935–2012), Belgian sailor and Olympian
- Cornelius Franciscus Nelis (1736–1798), Flemish statesman; Bishop of Antwerp 1785–98, brother of Jean-Charles
- Endel Nelis (1925–1993), Estonian fencer
- Georges Nélis (1886–1929), Belgian aviation pioneer
- Jean-Charles de Nelis (1748–1834), Flemish noble, lawyer, and pomologist, brother of Cornelius
  - Named for him: Winter Nelis pear, a pear he cultivated
- Joseph Nelis (1917–1994), Belgian football striker
- Mary Nelis (1998–2004), Member of the Northern Ireland Assembly

== See also ==
- Nelissen, patronymic surname
- Nellis
