= Palatine Church =

Historic church in New York, United States

- U.S. National Register of Historic Places
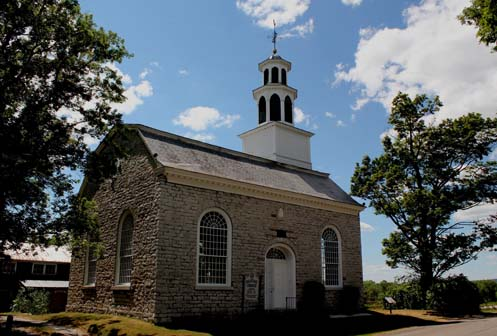

- Location within New York Location within the United States
- Location: Mohawk Tpke., Palatine, New York
- Coordinates: 42°58′8″N 74°37′44″W
- Area: 0.2 acres (0.081 ha)
- Built: 1770
- NRHP reference No.: 73001209
- Added to NRHP: January 25, 1973

Palatine Church, also known as Palatine Evangelical Lutheran Church, is a historic Evangelical Lutheran church on Mohawk Turnpike in Palatine, Montgomery County, New York. It was built in 1770 and is a small, rectangular, one story structure with massive stone walls. It features a traditional meetinghouse plan.

It was added to the National Register of Historic Places in 1973.
