= Bates-Englehardt Mansion =

Historic house in New York, United States

- U.S. National Register of Historic Places
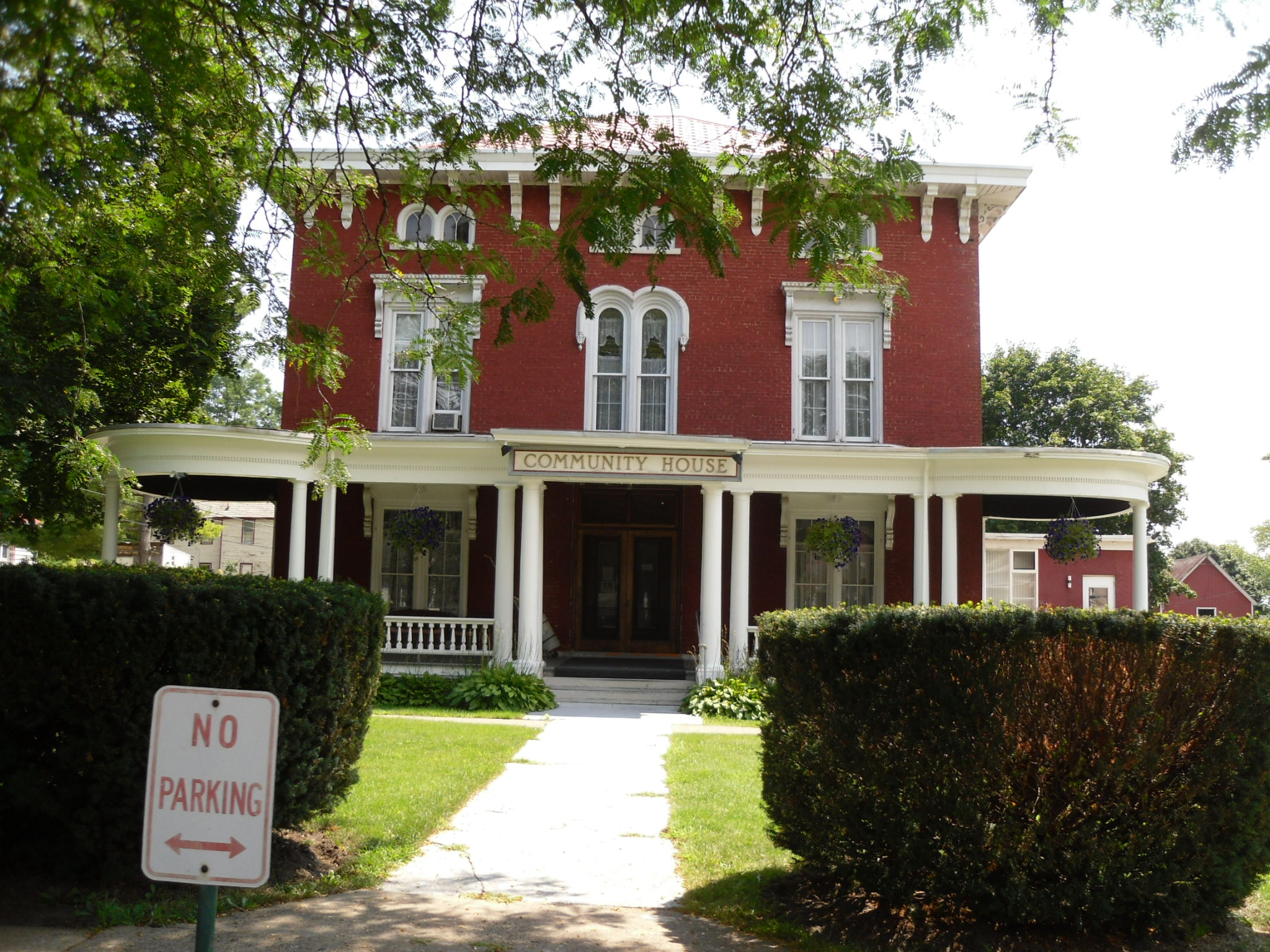
- Bates-Englehardt Mansion, August 2010

- Location within New York Location within the United States
- Location: 19 Washington St., St. Johnsville, New York
- Coordinates: 42°59′59″N 74°40′38″W
- Area: 1 acre (0.40 ha)
- Built: 1869
- Architectural style: Colonial Revival, Italianate
- NRHP reference No.: 89002091
- Added to NRHP: December 7, 1989

Bates-Englehardt Mansion, also known as St. Johnsville Community House, is a historic home located at St. Johnsville in Montgomery County, New York, United States. It was built in 1869 as a three-story Italianate style mansion. It has a 35 feet by 40 feet main block with a two-story kitchen wing in the rear. A brick solarium was added in 1916 and enlarged and converted to an auditorium in 1934. The original Italianate style flat roof with cupola was replaced in 1916 with a Georgian style roof. The front entrance features a Colonial Revival style porch added in 1909.

It was added to the National Register of Historic Places in 1989.
