= Reformed Dutch Church of Stone Arabia =

Historic church in New York, United States

- U.S. National Register of Historic Places
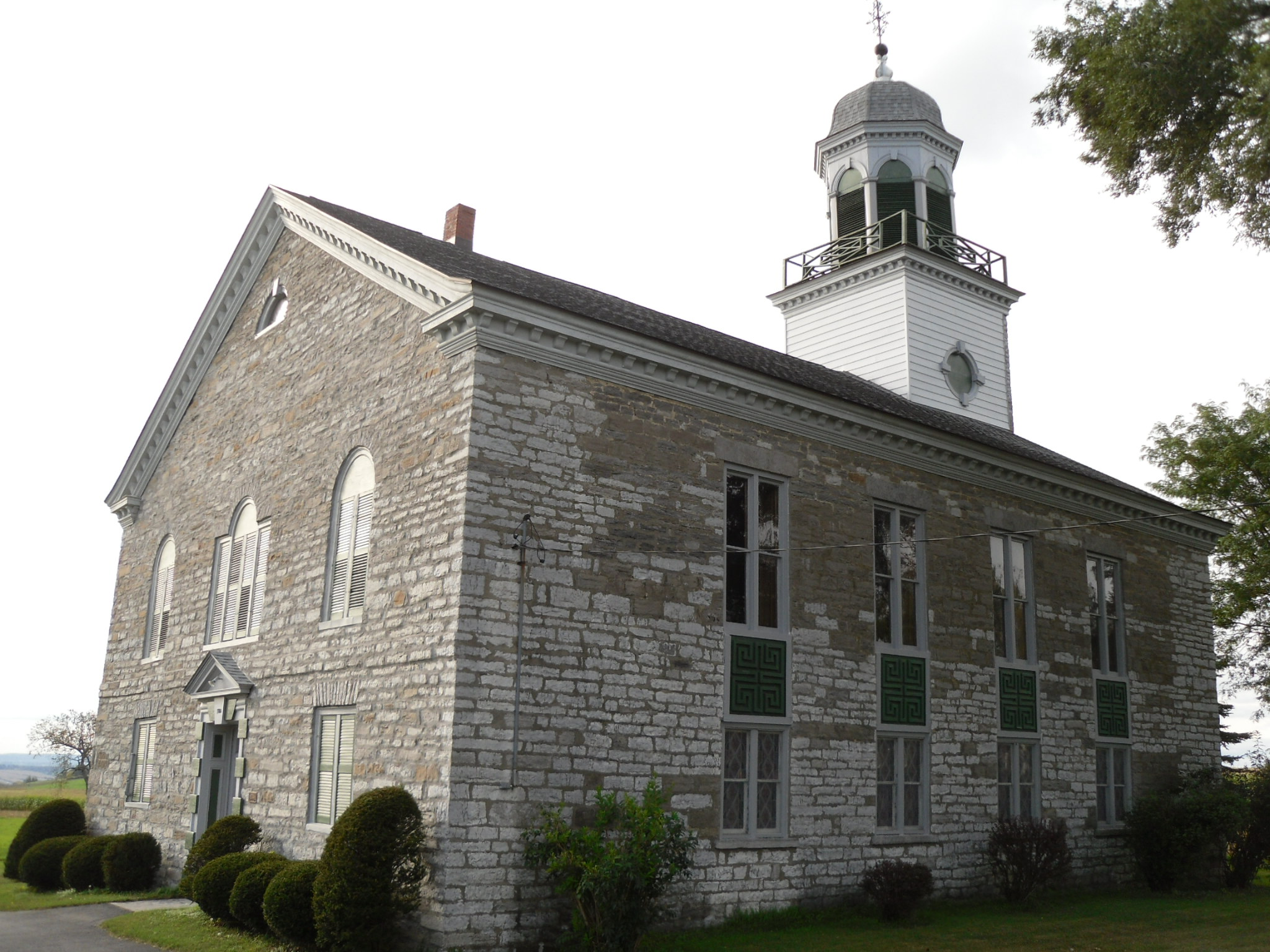
- Reformed Dutch Church of Stone Arabia, September 2010

- Location within New York Location within the United States
- Nearest city: Nelliston, New York
- Coordinates: 42°56′33″N 74°33′24″W
- Area: less than one acre
- Built: 1788
- Architect: Schuyler, Philip
- Architectural style: Georgian
- NRHP reference No.: 77000951
- Added to NRHP: September 14, 1977

Reformed Dutch Church of Stone Arabia, also known as Stone Arabia Reformed Church, is a historic Dutch Reformed church located near Nelliston in Stone Arabia, Montgomery County, New York. It was built in 1788 and is a simple rectangular building constructed of cut limestone blocks. It has a somewhat flattened gable roof and a belfry. It features a Palladian window in the Georgian style. Located immediately south is the Trinity Lutheran Church and Cemetery.

The Reformed Dutch Church of Stone Arabia was added to the National Register of Historic Places in 1977.
