= Nelliston Historic District =

Historic district in New York, United States

- U.S. National Register of Historic Places
- U.S. Historic district
- Location within New York Location within the United States
- Location: Prospect, River, Railroad and Berthoud Sts., Nelliston, New York
- Coordinates: 42°56′2″N 74°37′0″W
- Area: 39 acres (16 ha)
- Built: 1860
- Architectural style: Italianate
- MPS: Nelliston MRA
- NRHP reference No.: 80002658
- Added to NRHP: September 27, 1980

Nelliston Historic District is a national historic district located at Nelliston in Montgomery County, New York. It includes 56 contributing buildings. It encompasses three of Nelliston's residential streets developed between 1860 and 1890. It also includes the area along the railroad tracks containing two freight houses and the 1902 railroad station. Notable residential structures include the Abram Nellis Mansion; a brick two story Italianate style dwelling dated to the 1860s.

It was listed on the National Register of Historic Places in 1980.
