= Trinity Lutheran Church and Cemetery (Stone Arabia, New York) =

Historic church and cemetery in Montgomery County, New York, US

- U.S. National Register of Historic Places
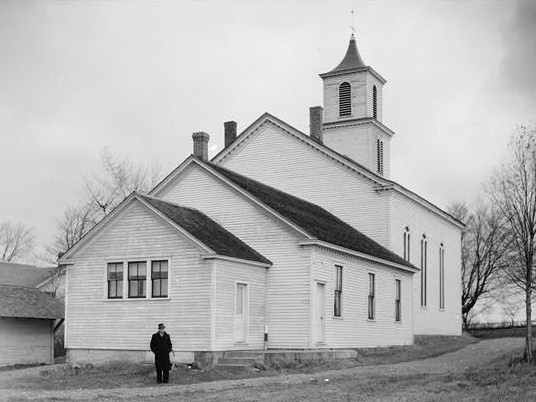
- Trinity Lutheran Church, August 1936

- Location within New York Location within the United States
- Location: 5430 NY 10, Stone Arabia, New York
- Coordinates: 42°56′29.68″N 74°33′21.05″W
- Area: 20.3 acres (8.2 ha)
- Built: 1792
- Architectural style: Italianate
- NRHP reference No.: 04001440
- Added to NRHP: January 5, 2005

Trinity Lutheran Church and Cemetery is a historic Lutheran church and cemetery at 5430 NY 10 in Stone Arabia, Montgomery County, New York. Located immediately north is the Reformed Dutch Church of Stone Arabia.

The original log church, built in 1729, was burned to the ground by British forces led by Sir John Johnson during the October 19, 1780 Battle of Stone Arabia. The current wooden framed structure was built in 1792. It is a rectangular, gable roofed vernacular Federal style building with later Italianate modifications. The cemetery was established in the early 18th century and contains approximately 25 burials. The earliest extant gravestone dates to 1752.

It was added to the National Register of Historic Places in 2005.
