= Waterman-Gramps House =

Historic house in New York, United States

- U.S. National Register of Historic Places
- Location within New York Location within the United States
- Location: School St., Nelliston, New York
- Coordinates: 42°56′13″N 74°36′45″W
- Area: less than one acre
- Built: 1865
- MPS: Nelliston MRA
- NRHP reference No.: 80002660
- Added to NRHP: September 27, 1980

Waterman-Grampse House is a historic home located at Nelliston in Montgomery County, New York. It was built about 1865 and is a small, 1 1/2-story stone house of coursed rubble with cut-stone lintels and sills. A frame house built in the 1960s is attached to the north side.

It was added to the National Register of Historic Places in 1980.
