= Lasher-Davis House =

Historic house in New York, United States

- U.S. National Register of Historic Places
- Location within New York Location within the United States
- Location: U.S. 5, Nelliston, New York
- Coordinates: 42°56′9″N 74°36′55″W
- Area: less than one acre
- Built: 1865
- MPS: Nelliston MRA
- NRHP reference No.: 80002656
- Added to NRHP: September 27, 1980

Lasher-Davis House is a historic home located at Nelliston in Montgomery County, New York. It was built in 1865 and is a small, 1 1/2-story frame building with a gable roof. It features an attractive porch with cut-out railings and brackets under the porch eaves.

It was added to the National Register of Historic Places in 1980.
