= Salt Springville, New York =

- Hamlet
- Location within New York Location within the United States
- Coordinates: 42°51′33″N 74°44′45″W
- Country: United States
- State: New York
- Counties: Montgomery, Otsego
- Towns: Minden, Cherry Valley
- Elevation: 991 ft (302 m)
- Time zone: UTC-5 (Eastern (EST))
  - Summer (DST): UTC-4 (EDT)
- Area code: 315

Salt Springville, also known as Salt Springsville, is a hamlet southeast of Fort Plain. It is located partially in the towns of Minden and Cherry Valley, on the Montgomery County/Otsego County border in New York, United States. The Windfall Dutch Barn is located here and was added to the National Register of Historic Places in 2000.
