= Nelles =

Nelles is a surname. Notable people with the surname include:

- H. Vivian Nelles, Canadian historian
- Mathilde Nelles (born 1997), Belgian alpine ski racer
- Maurice Nelles, American engineer, business executive and professor
- Percy W. Nelles (1892–1951), Canadian admiral
- Robert Nelles (1761–1842), Canadian businessman and political figure
- Samuel Sobieski Nelles (1823–1887), Canadian Methodist minister and academic
- Walter Nelles (1883–1937), American lawyer and law professor

== See also ==
- Fred C. Nelles Youth Correctional Facility, was in essence a prison for youth located on Whittier Boulevard, in Whittier, California (US)
- Nellis
