= Rice's Woods =

- U.S. National Register of Historic Places
- Nearest city: Canajoharie, New York
- Area: 20 acres (8.1 ha)
- NRHP reference No.: 80002654
- Added to NRHP: July 18, 1980

Rice's Woods is an archaeological site located at Canajoharie in Montgomery County, New York. S. L. Frey, the pioneer Mohawk Valley archaeologist, believed that the Mohawk village site in Rice's Woods, on Big Nose, was Canajorha, the Middle Castle of the Mohawks after about 1677. Other authorities believe that it was the Lower Castle at this same period.

It was listed on the National Register of Historic Places in 1980.
