= Walrath-Van Horne House =

Historic house in New York, United States

- U.S. National Register of Historic Places
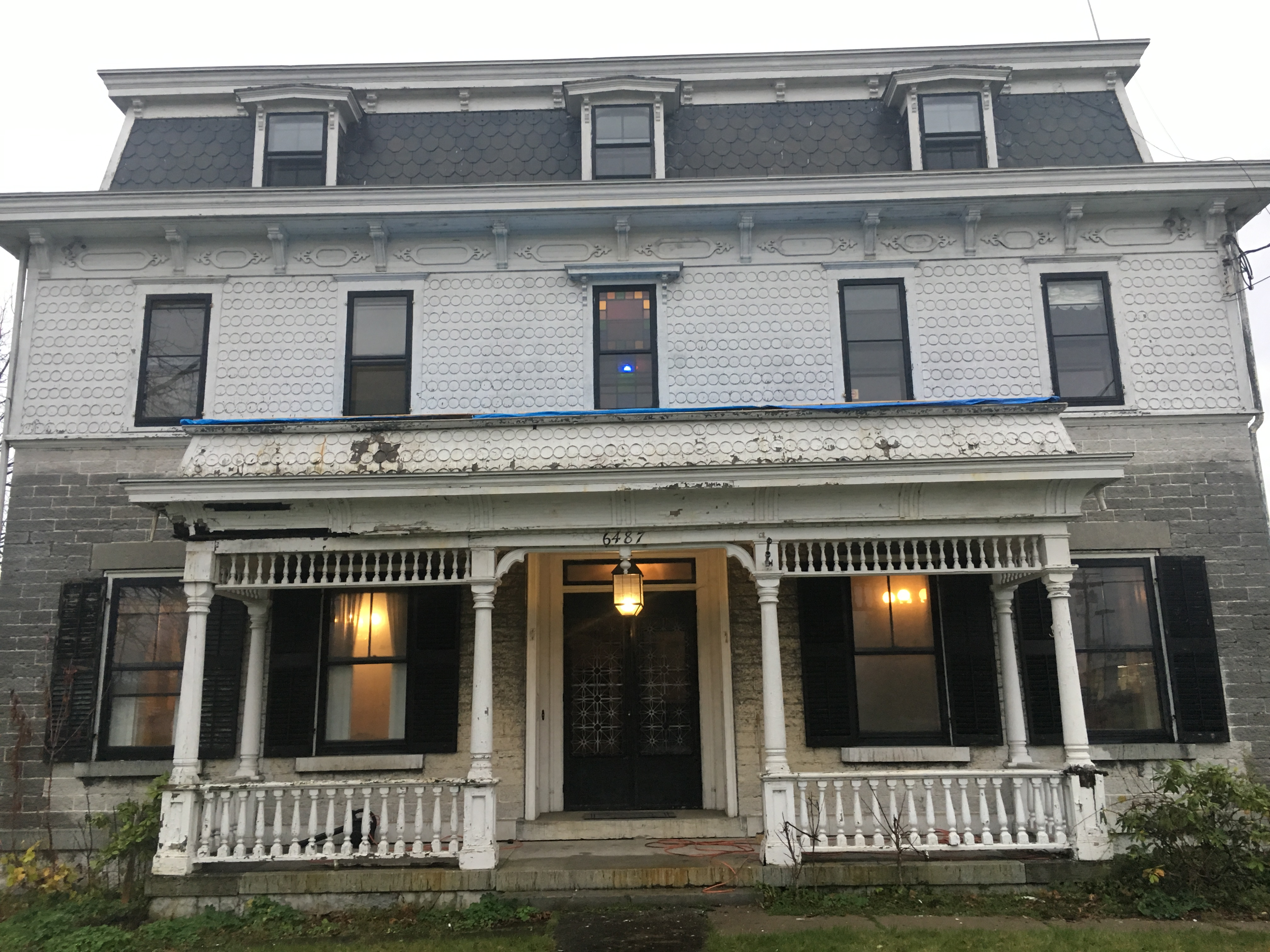

- Location within New York Location within the United States
- Location: W. Main St. Nelliston, New York
- Coordinates: 42°56′29″N 74°37′8″W
- Area: less than one acre
- Built: 1842
- Architectural style: Second Empire
- MPS: Nelliston MRA
- NRHP reference No.: 80002659
- Added to NRHP: September 27, 1980

Walrath-Van Horne House is a historic home located at Nelliston in Montgomery County, New York. It was built in 1842 and was originally a 1 1/2-story Greek Revival stone house with a full-height portico. In 1895, a frame, shingled second story topped by a Mansard roof and new porch with mansard styling replaced the original. The house retains some Greek Revival interior styling, but the exterior has a Second Empire style.

It was added to the National Register of Historic Places in 1980.
