= Stone Grist Mill Complex =

Historic house in New York, United States

- U.S. National Register of Historic Places
- Location within New York Location within the United States
- Nearest city: St. Johnsville, New York
- Coordinates: 43°0′17″N 74°41′47″W
- Area: 4.5 acres (1.8 ha)
- Built: 1835
- Architectural style: Federal
- NRHP reference No.: 96000140
- Added to NRHP: February 23, 1996

Stone Grist Mill Complex is a historic grist mill complex located at St. Johnsville in Montgomery County, New York. The complex consists of the mill, the remains of a stone impoundment dam, the mill owner's house, bar, wagon shed, and hog house. The mill was built about 1835 and is a 30 by 50 feet gable roofed structure constructed of rough cut, native limestone block laid in random ashlar. The mill is now occupied by a bed and breakfast.

It was added to the National Register of Historic Places in 1996.
