= Nelliston School =

- U.S. National Register of Historic Places
- Location within New York Location within the United States
- Location: Stone Arabia Street, Nelliston, New York
- Coordinates: 42°56′08″N 74°36′47″W
- Area: less than one acre
- Built: 1869
- Architect: James Pealer, Christian Marsh
- Architectural style: Romanesque
- NRHP reference No.: 02001645
- Added to NRHP: December 31, 2002

Nelliston School is a historic school building in Nelliston, New York. It was built in 1869 and is a two-story, square-shaped brick institutional building. It has a shallow pitched gable roof. It served the educational needs of the community until 1971.

It was added to the National Register of Historic Places in 2002.

In 2022, the New Montgomery County childcare facility was put in the old Nelliston School building.
