= Van Wie Farmstead =

- U.S. National Register of Historic Places
- Location within New York Location within the United States
- Location: 269 Brower Rd., near McKinley, New York
- Coordinates: 42°54′10″N 74°31′31″W
- Area: 150 acres (61 ha)
- Built: c. 1850, 1873-1874, 1884
- Architectural style: Italianate
- NRHP reference No.: 11000450
- Added to NRHP: July 14, 2011

Van Wie Farmstead, also known as Valley View Farm, is a historic home and related farm outbuildings located near McKinley in Montgomery County, New York. It includes the farmhouse, a carriage house, a large multi-block barn (1874 and later), a slat sided hay barn, a Butler grain bin (c. 1950), pole barn (c. 1950), and a hop barn (c. 1884). The house consists of a two-story, Italianate style main block built in 1873, with an attached 1 1/2 story all dated to c. 1850.

It was added to the National Register of Historic Places in 2011.
