= Nellis Tavern =

Historic tavern in New York, United States

- U.S. National Register of Historic Places
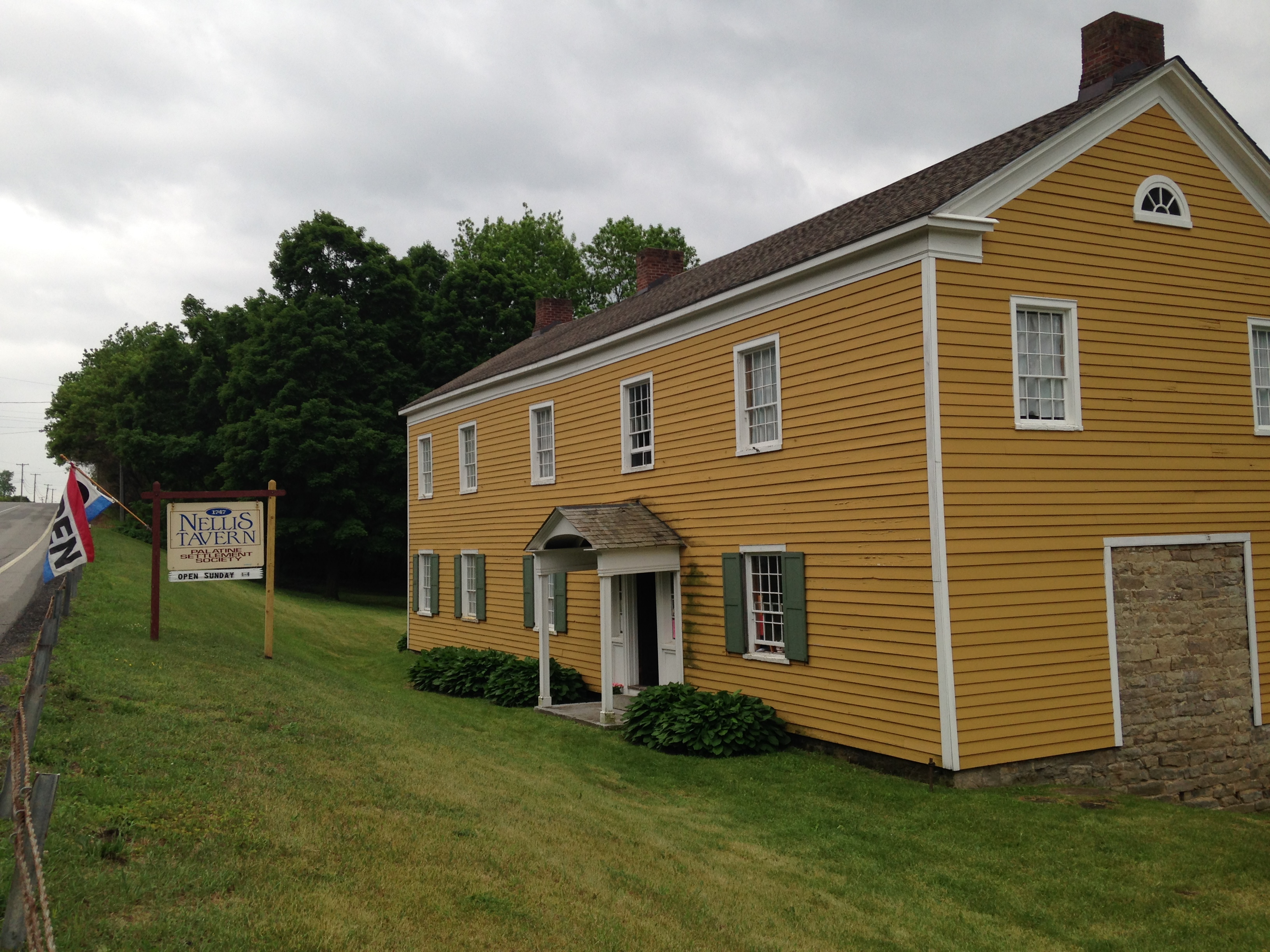

- Location within New York Location within the United States
- Location: SR 5, St. Johnsville, New York
- Coordinates: 42°59′37″N 74°39′33″W
- Area: less than one acre
- Built: 1750
- Architect: Nellis, Christian, Sr.
- Architectural style: Federal, Settlement era
- NRHP reference No.: 90000685
- Added to NRHP: May 10, 1990

Nellis Tavern is a historic inn and tavern located at St. Johnsville in Montgomery County, New York. It was built about 1747-1750 as a farmhouse and expanded about 1790 to its present form. It is a two-story, five-by-two-bay frame residence constructed atop a coursed rubblestone foundation. The building has been restored to the period of about 1835, when it was used as a tavern.

After the American Civil War the tavern business declined and the building was used again as a family farmhouse.

It was added to the National Register of Historic Places in 1990.

An herb garden has been established on the grounds, and there is an associated yearly Rhubarb Festival.

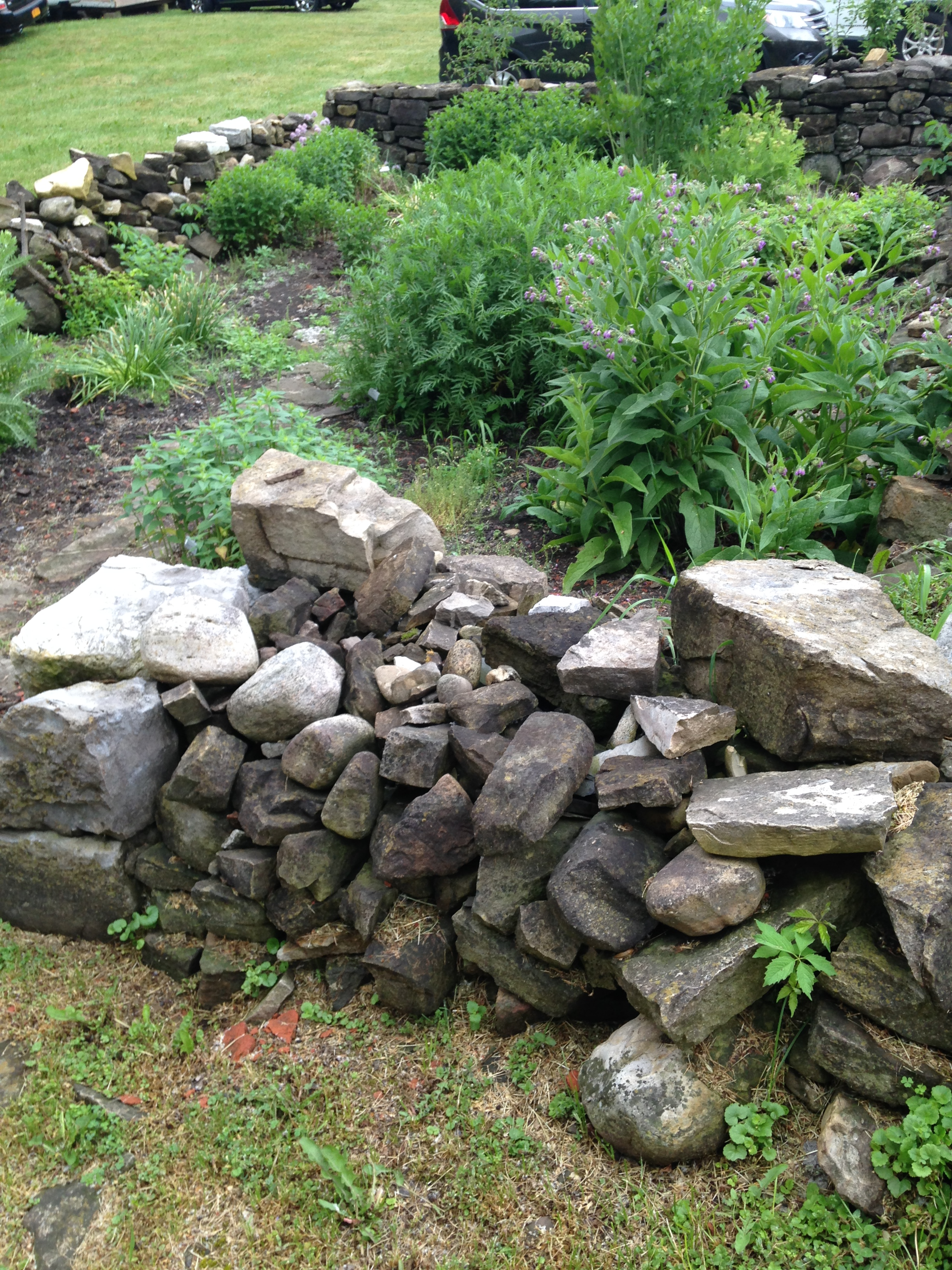
Herb Garden

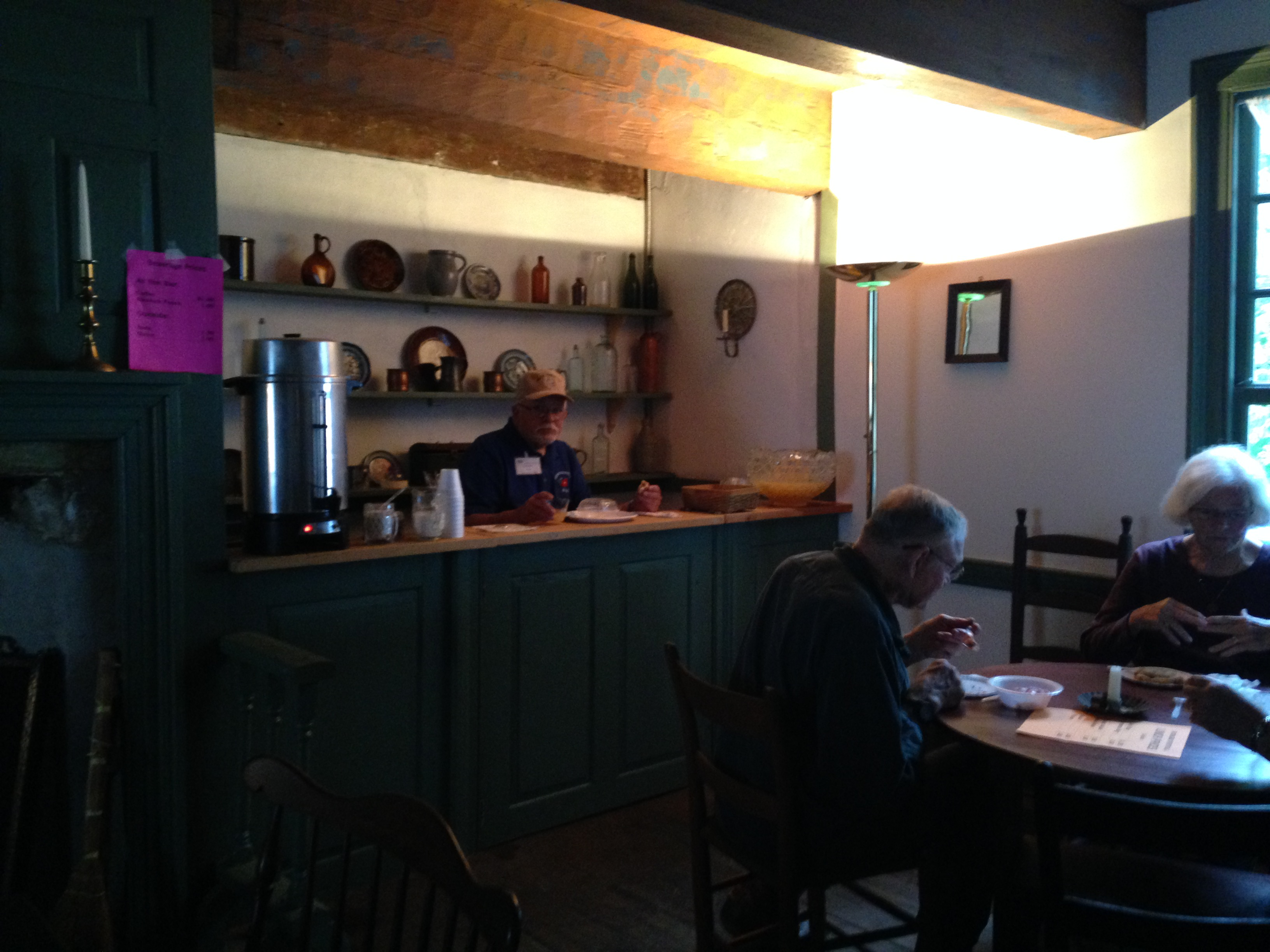
Interior tavern room on 1st floor

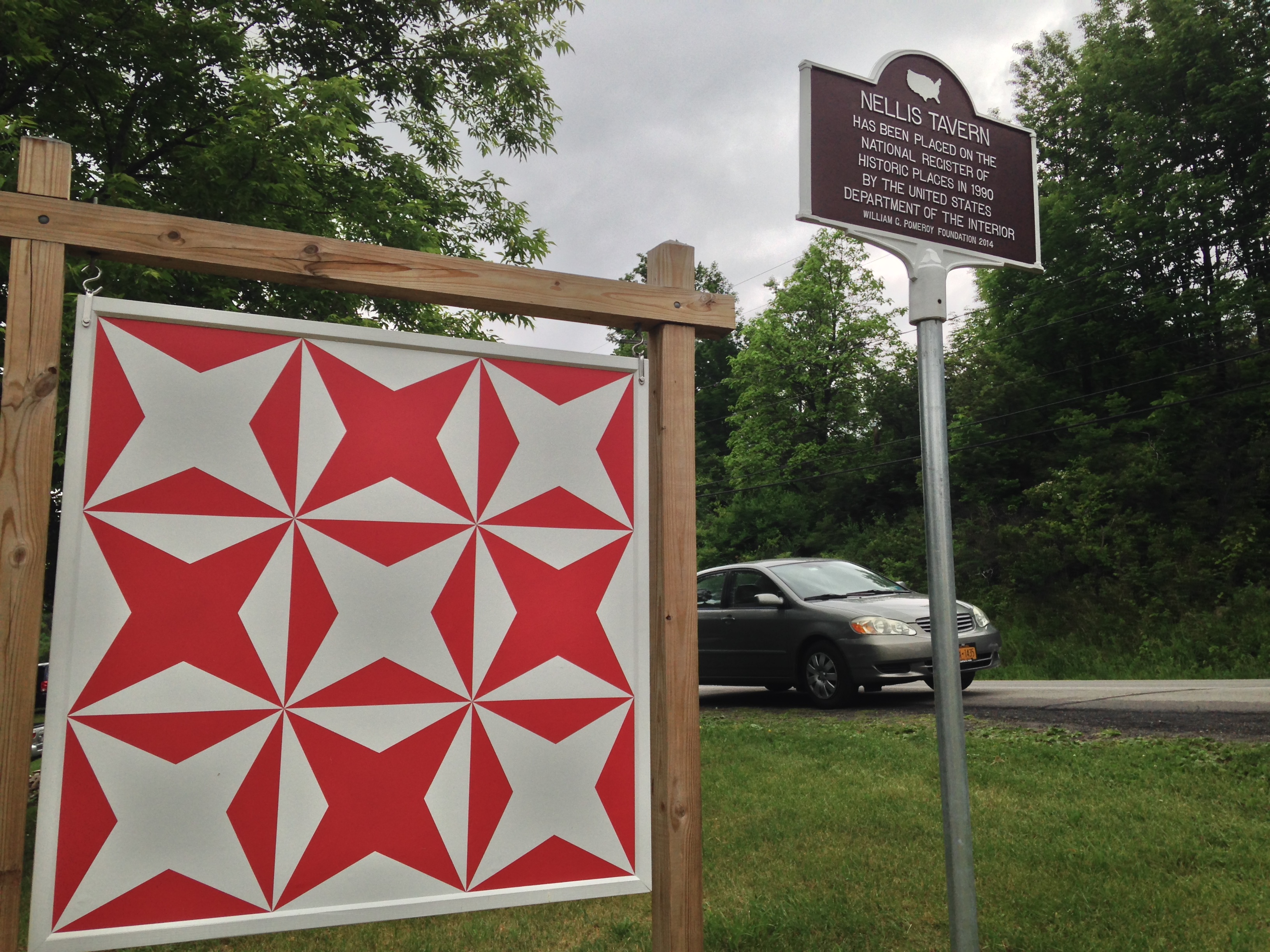
