= Jacob Nellis Farmhouse =

Historic house in New York, United States

- U.S. National Register of Historic Places
- Location within New York Location within the United States
- Location: Nellis St., Nelliston, New York
- Coordinates: 42°56′0″N 74°36′27″W
- Area: 28.7 acres (11.6 ha)
- Built: 1834
- Architectural style: Greek Revival, Greek revival vernacular
- MPS: Nelliston MRA
- NRHP reference No.: 80002657
- Added to NRHP: September 27, 1980

Jacob Nellis Farmhouse is a historic home located at Nelliston in Montgomery County, New York. It was built in the 1830s and is a rectangular, 1½-story, five-bay-long stone building with a three-bay lower 1½-story extension on the north side. The house is in the Greek Revival style. Also on the property is a small 19th-century barn and a large, multi-level 20th-century barn.

It was added to the National Register of Historic Places in 1980.
