= Palatine Bridge Freight House =

- U.S. National Register of Historic Places
- Location within New York Location within the United States
- Location: East of Palatine Bridge on NY 5, near Palatine Bridge, New York
- Coordinates: 42°54′36″N 74°33′59″W
- Area: 0 acres (0 ha)
- Built: 1855
- NRHP reference No.: 73001208
- Added to NRHP: March 7, 1973

Palatine Bridge Freight House is a historic freight depot located at Palatine Bridge in Montgomery County, New York. It is a rectangular limestone building constructed in the mid-1850s. It measures 300 feet long and is a fine example of a mid 19th century storage house. It has a low slope gable roof with overhanging eaves.

It was added to the National Register of Historic Places in 1973.
