= Ehle House Site =

- U.S. National Register of Historic Places
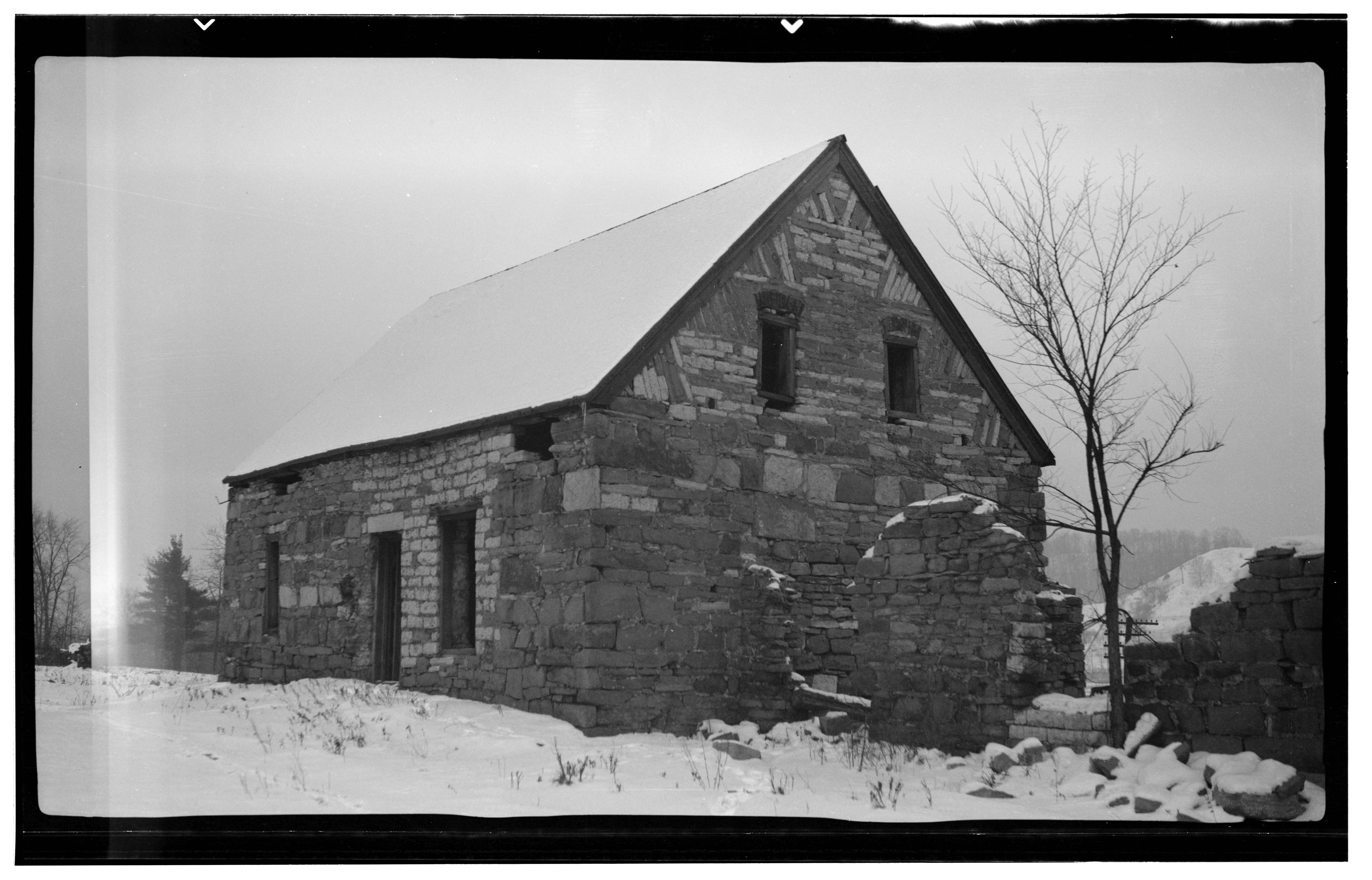
- Ruins of the house, 1936/7
- Location: Address Restricted, Nelliston, New York
- Area: 1.5 acres (0.61 ha)
- Built: 1729
- NRHP reference No.: 82004780
- Added to NRHP: June 14, 1982

The Ehle House Site is an archaeological site located at Nelliston in Montgomery County, New York. The house that stood at this site was built in 1729 by Jacobus Ehle, a Palatine German, who preached in the Hudson Valley and then made his way to the Mohawk Valley. The house is no longer standing.

The site was listed on the National Register of Historic Places in 1982.
