= Guy Park =

Historic house in New York, United States

- Guy Park Manor
- U.S. National Register of Historic Places
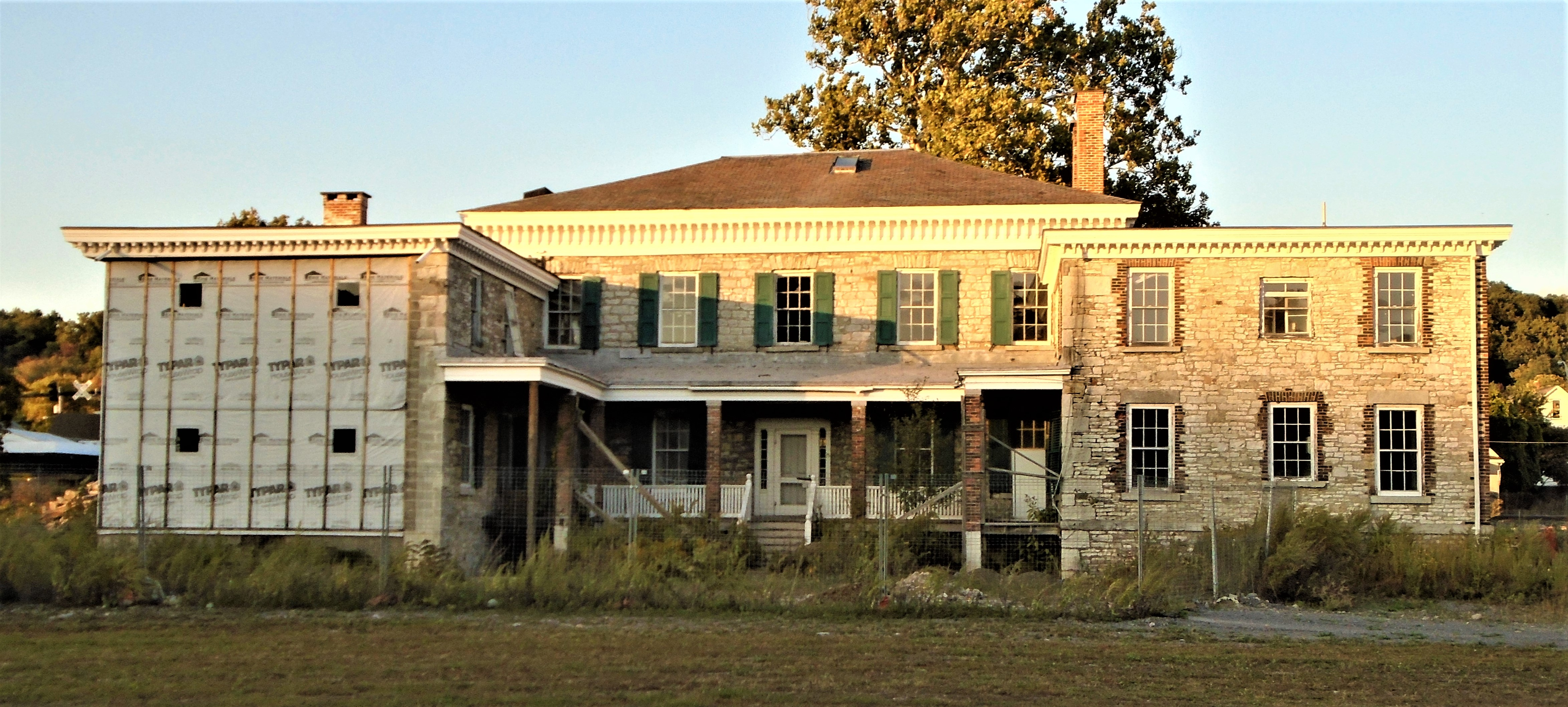
- View from the Mohawk River side (2020)

- Location within New York Location within the United States
- Location: W. Main St., Amsterdam, New York
- Coordinates: 42°56′49″N 74°12′36″W
- Built: 1774
- Architectural style: Georgian
- NRHP reference No.: 73001206
- Added to NRHP: February 6, 1973

Guy Park, also known as Guy Park State Historic Site or Guy Park Manor, is a house built in 1774 in the Georgian style for Guy Johnson, the Irish-born nephew and son-in-law to Sir William Johnson, 1st Baronet, the British Superintendent for Indian Affairs in colonial New York. Built of limestone, the house was originally situated on a square mile of land on the north side of the Mohawk River and near it for access to water transportation.

== Guy Johnson ==
Born in Ireland, Guy Johnson immigrated to New York as a young man, moving to the Mohawk Valley where his uncle had his base. Johnson married Mary (also known as Polly), one of the senior Johnson's daughters with his first common-law wife, Catherine Weisenberg. In 1773 the senior Johnson gave his nephew and daughter a square mile of land near the Mohawk River as a wedding present. They built their first house there but it burned the next year after being struck by lightning.

Guy Johnson commissioned a limestone house in the Georgian architectural style, which was built in 1774. After his uncle William Johnson died in 1774, Guy was appointed by the Crown to succeed him as British Superintendent for Indian Affairs. His priority was to keep the powerful Iroquois nations on the side of the British in the face of increasing colonial tensions. As a Loyalist Johnson risked imprisonment, because of the hostility of local settlers who favored independence in the coming American Revolutionary War.

He gathered allies and friends and left the area in 1775 for Canada, abandoning his mansion. His wife Polly died in Oswego, New York during the journey. From 1776 to 1778 Johnson lived in British-occupied New York City. By 1779, he had established headquarters in Niagara, Ontario, from where he directed military forces against the rebels in the Mohawk Valley. After the war, he returned to London, where he died in 1788.

== Description ==
The house was built in 1774 of limestone in the Georgian architectural style. It is two stories tall.

== History ==
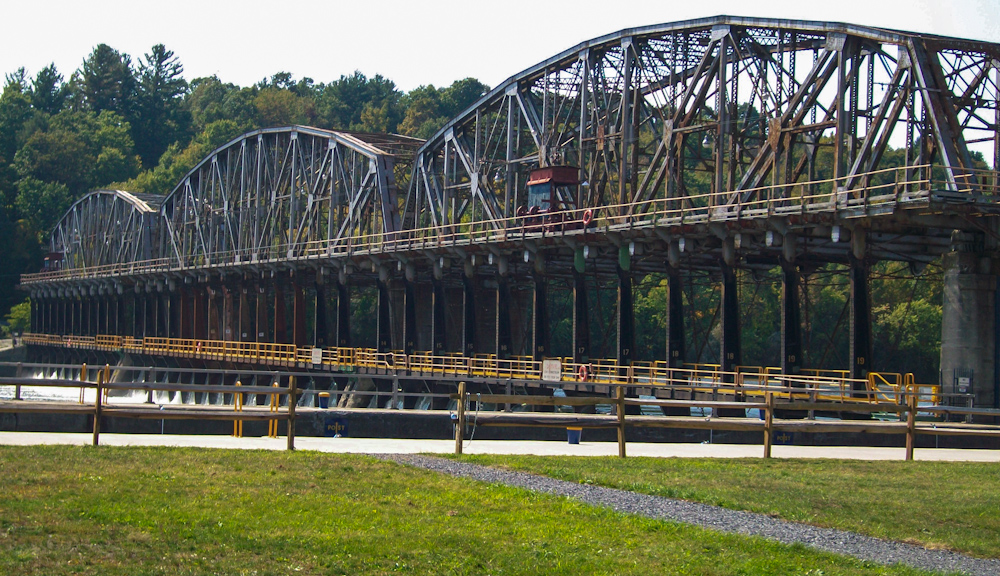
Lock E11 on the Mohawk River behind Guy Park

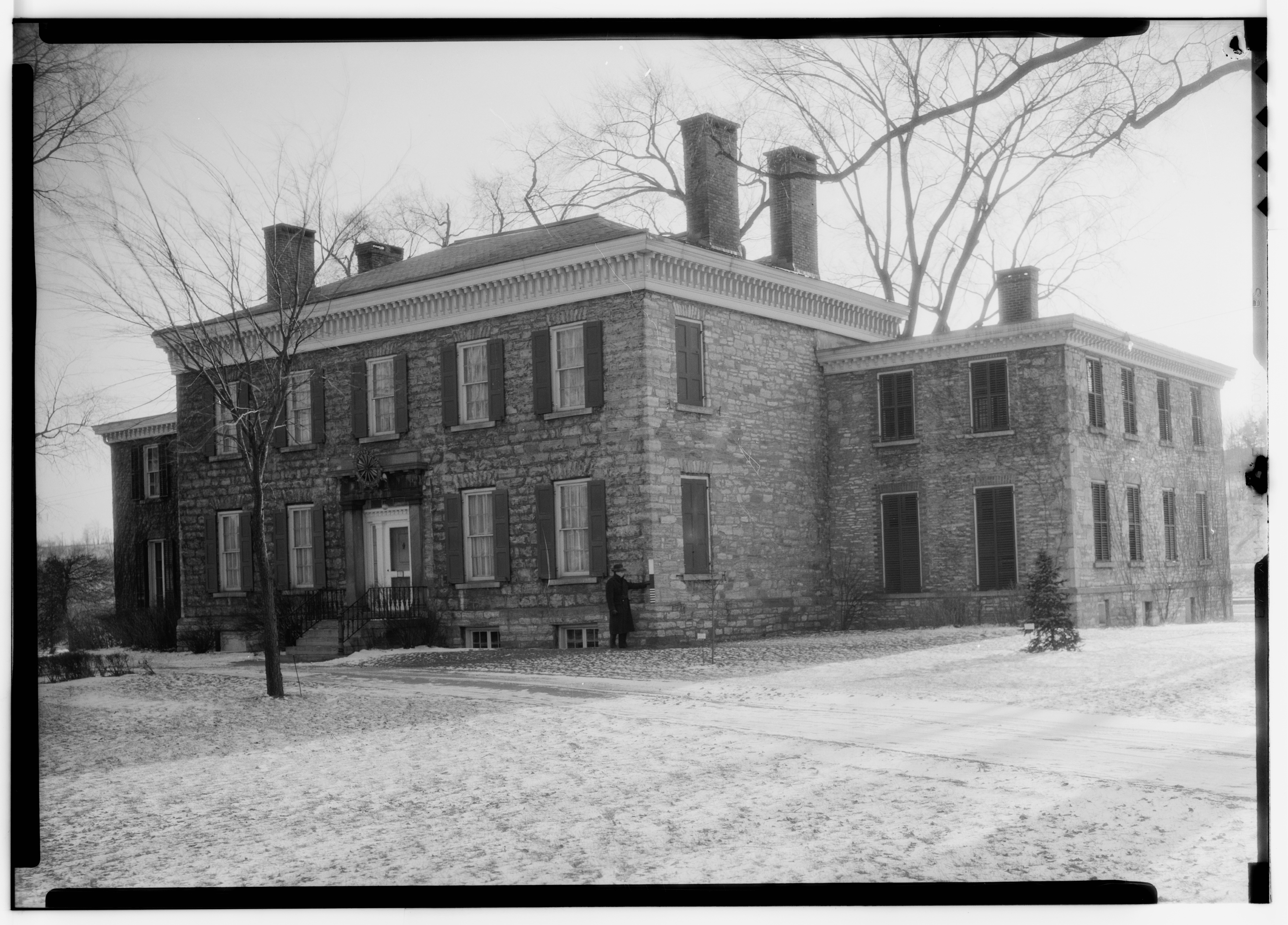
Back view from 1936

In 1779 the new governments of the United States and New York declared as traitors those Loyalists who had gone to Canada, and the state confiscated their properties. The state sold Guy Park to a private owner. A steady flow of migrants moved along the road in the plain by the Mohawk River as part of the European-American settlement of former Iroquois lands. At this time, the state and speculators were selling millions of acres of land to the west; thousands of migrants from New England crossed the state seeking such lands; some veterans were awarded grants of land in lieu of pay.

Guy Park was used for years in the early nineteenth century as a tavern and stagecoach stop, as it was on the Mohawk Turnpike next to the river, the two main transportation routes across the state. The Erie Canal was completed in 1825, and a lock is located near the house. Later, the house was sold and served again as a private residence for many years.

In 1907 the mansion was purchased by the state for preservation as a historic site. In the early 21st century, it was adapted for use as a local history museum, the Walter Elwood Museum. Elwood, a history teacher, began collecting in the 1930s. The museum has featured exhibits from his large collection of local artifacts, ranging from historic objects crafted by the Mohawk and other Iroquois tribes of New York, to items related to the development and history of the Erie Canal, the local carpet industry, and the city of Amsterdam.

In August 2011, shortly after being occupied by the museum, the house was severely damaged by flooding of the Mohawk River in the aftermath of Hurricane Irene. Half of two floors were destroyed and its contents soaked and scattered. The state has struggled to stabilize the building. The museum has moved to a new location. Since 2016 work has been done to stabilize the nearby canal walls to ensure flooding is mitigated. Renovation and restoration work on home will commence after canal walls is completed.

Restoration works began in 2022, as part of the Reimagine the Canals initiative to bring greater tourism to the Erie Canal area. Guy Park is planned to become an "education and resilience center". In 2024, the house was raised by four feet in order to protect it from future floods.

The house is listed on the National Register of Historic Places.

== See also ==
- List of New York State Historic Sites
