= Windfall Dutch Barn =

- U.S. National Register of Historic Places
- Location within New York Location within the United States
- Location: Salt Springville, New York
- Coordinates: 42°51′32″N 74°44′40″W
- NRHP reference No.: 00001411
- Added to NRHP: November 22, 2000

Windfall Dutch Barn is a historic barn located in Salt Springville, Montgomery County, New York at the corner of Clinton Road and Ripple Road. This barn was used as a resting place during the wagon march by General Clinton on the way to the Susquehanna River, consisting of 400 boats, loaded on wagons, and 3000 patriots, during the revolutionary war.

The barn is now used as an entertainment center for the neighboring communities. The barn is also available for private parties, such as wedding receptions and reunions.
