= Peter Ehle House =

Historic house in New York, United States

- U.S. National Register of Historic Places
- Location within New York Location within the United States
- Location: E. Main St., Nelliston, New York
- Coordinates: 42°55′24″N 74°36′5″W
- Area: 5 acres (2.0 ha)
- Built: ca. 1826
- Architect: Ehle, Peter
- Architectural style: Federal, Late Federal
- MPS: Nelliston MRA
- NRHP reference No.: 80002655
- Added to NRHP: September 27, 1980

Peter Ehle House is a historic home located at Nelliston in Montgomery County, New York. It was built about 1826 and is a rectangular, two story stone building with a gable roof and inside end chimneys in the Late Federal style. Also on the property is a large barn complex including a large frame barn, two carriage houses, and a small stone outbuilding. Remains of a large part stone barn are also present.

It was added to the National Register of Historic Places in 1980.
