= Palatine Bridge, New York =

- Village
- Location within New York Location within the United States
- Coordinates: 42°54′39″N 74°34′29″W
- Country: United States
- State: New York
- County: Montgomery
- Town: Palatine

Area
  - Total: 0.99 sq mi (2.57 km^{2})
  - Land: 0.92 sq mi (2.39 km^{2})
  - Water: 0.073 sq mi (0.19 km^{2})
- Elevation: 344 ft (105 m)

Population (2020)
  - Total: 796
  - Density: 863.9/sq mi (333.54/km^{2})
- Time zone: UTC-5 (Eastern (EST))
  - Summer (DST): UTC-4 (EDT)
- ZIP Code: 13428
- Area code: 518
- FIPS code: 36-56110
- GNIS feature ID: 0959768
- Website: https://www.villageofpalatinebridge.org/

Palatine Bridge is a village in Montgomery County, New York, United States. The population was 796 at the 2020 census. The name refers to the community's location in a region settled by Palatine Germans. The village is in the town of Palatine.

== History ==
Palatine Bridge was settled in 1723. A bridge across the Mohawk River here built in 1802 gave the community its name. The village was incorporated in 1867.

The 1802 bridge was a single uncovered wooden arch 330 feet long, and collapsed in 1807. A new one built from the same lumber was built in 1808, this time a covered bridge resting on 3 stone piers. This bridge was swept away by a flood in 1822 and was replaced the same year, but was lost to another flood and replaced in 1833.

Looking west from Palatine Bridge

The Frey House and Palatine Bridge Freight House are listed on the National Register of Historic Places. In 2019 most of the developed portion of the village was listed on the Register as the Palatine Bridge Historic District.

== Geography ==
Palatine Bridge is located in the western part of Montgomery County at 42°54′39″N 74°34′29″W (42.910890, -74.574827). It is on the north side of the Mohawk River across from the village of Canajoharie and the New York State Thruway. New York State Route 5 (Grand Street) passes through Palatine Bridge, where it intersects with New York State Route 10 (Lafayette Street). NY-5, following the Mohawk River, leads east 22 miles (35 km) to Amsterdam and northwest 18 miles (29 km) to Little Falls, while NY-10 leads north 19 miles (31 km) to Caroga Lake and south into Canajoharie village and thence to Sharon Springs, 11 miles (18 km) distant.

According to the U.S. Census Bureau, the village of Palatine Bridge has a total area of 0.99 square miles (2.56 km^{2}), of which 0.92 square miles (2.38 km^{2}) are land and 0.07 square miles (0.18 km^{2}), or 7.25%, are water. The Mohawk River, here part of the Erie Canal system, accounts for the village's water area.

== Demographics ==
Historical population
Census	Pop.	Note	%±
1870	493		—
1880	332		−32.7%
1900	360		—
1910	392		8.9%
1920	443		13.0%
1930	503		13.5%
1940	585		16.3%
1950	592		1.2%
1960	578		−2.4%
1970	601		4.0%
1980	604		0.5%
1990	520		−13.9%
2000	706		35.8%
2010	737		4.4%
2020	796		8.0%
U.S. Decennial Census

As of the census of 2010, there were 737 people, 311 households, and 182 families residing in the village. The population density was 795.2 inhabitants per square mile (307.0/km^{2}). There were 335 housing units at an average density of 344.6 per square mile (133.1/km^{2}). The racial makeup of the village was 98% White, 0.1% African American, 0.5% Asian, and 1.1% from two or more races. Hispanic or Latino of any race were 1.6% of the population.

There were 311 households, out of which 21.2% had children under the age of 18 living with them, 58.5% were married couples living together, 9.3% had a female householder with no husband present, and 41.5% were non-families. 23.2% of all households were made up of individuals, and 43.7% had someone living alone who was 65 years of age or older. The average household size was 2.13 and the average family size was 2.72.

In the village, the population was spread out, with 13.2% under the age of 18, 7.8% from 18 to 24, 16.7% from 25 to 44, 30% from 45 to 64, and 31.2% who were 65 years of age or older. The median age was 53 years. For every 100 females, there were 86.3 males. For every 100 females age 18 and over, there were 76.4 males.

The median income for a household in the village was $29,773, and the median income for a family was $58,393. Males had a median income of $53,083 versus $31,667 for females. The per capita income for the village was $25,854. About 8.1% of families and 11.8% of the population were below the poverty line, including 1.4% of those under age 18 and 13.4% of those age 65 or over.

== Notable people ==
- Eli Cook, former mayor of Buffalo, New York
- Anthony Dimond, Alaska judge and politician
- George Alonzo Johnson, businessman
- John G. McMynn, Superintendent of Public Instruction of Wisconsin, educator
- Webster Wagner, local postmaster, state politician, and railroad inventor

== See also ==
- National Register of Historic Places listings in Montgomery County, New York
