= Frey House =

Historic house in New York, United States

- U.S. National Register of Historic Places
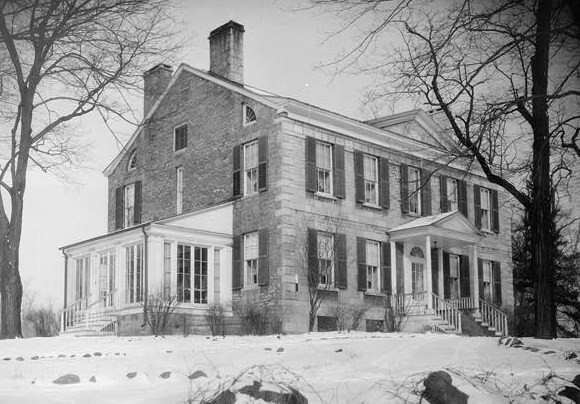
- Frey House, 1937

- Location within New York Location within the United States
- Location: NY 5, Palatine Bridge, New York
- Coordinates: 42°54′43″N 74°35′4″W
- Area: 8.9 acres (3.6 ha)
- Built: 1808
- Architectural style: Georgian, Federal
- NRHP reference No.: 02001644
- Added to NRHP: December 31, 2002

Frey House is a historic home located at Palatine Bridge in Montgomery County, New York. It was built in 1808 and consists of a double-pile, center-hall-plan main block with a 1 1/2-story, stone kitchen wing added in 1882, and sun porch dated to 1931. Also on the property are a five-bay garage (c. 1930), 19th-century lime kiln, and the Frey family cemetery.

It was added to the National Register of Historic Places in 2002.

== Gallery ==
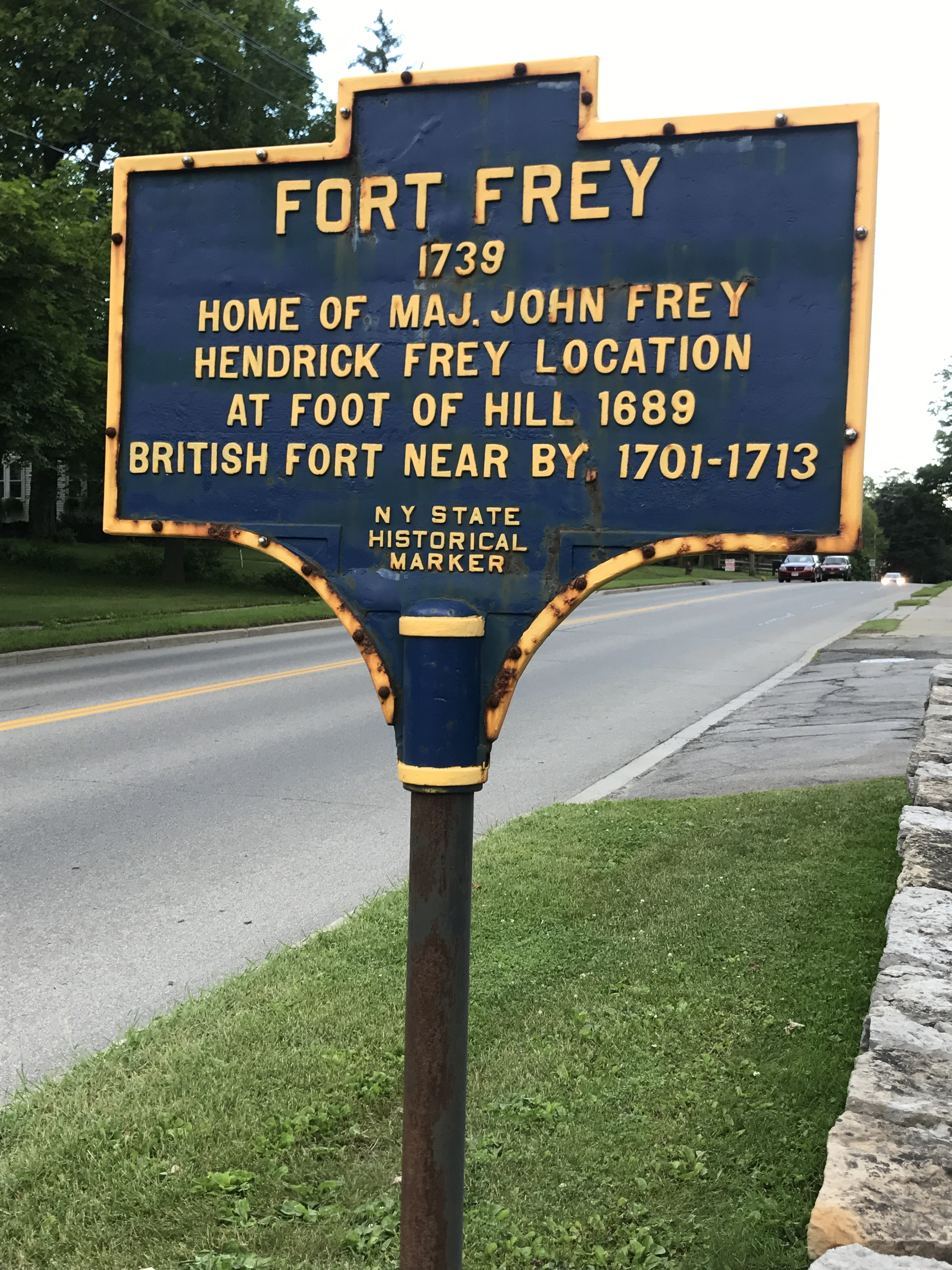
Historic Marker for Fort Frey

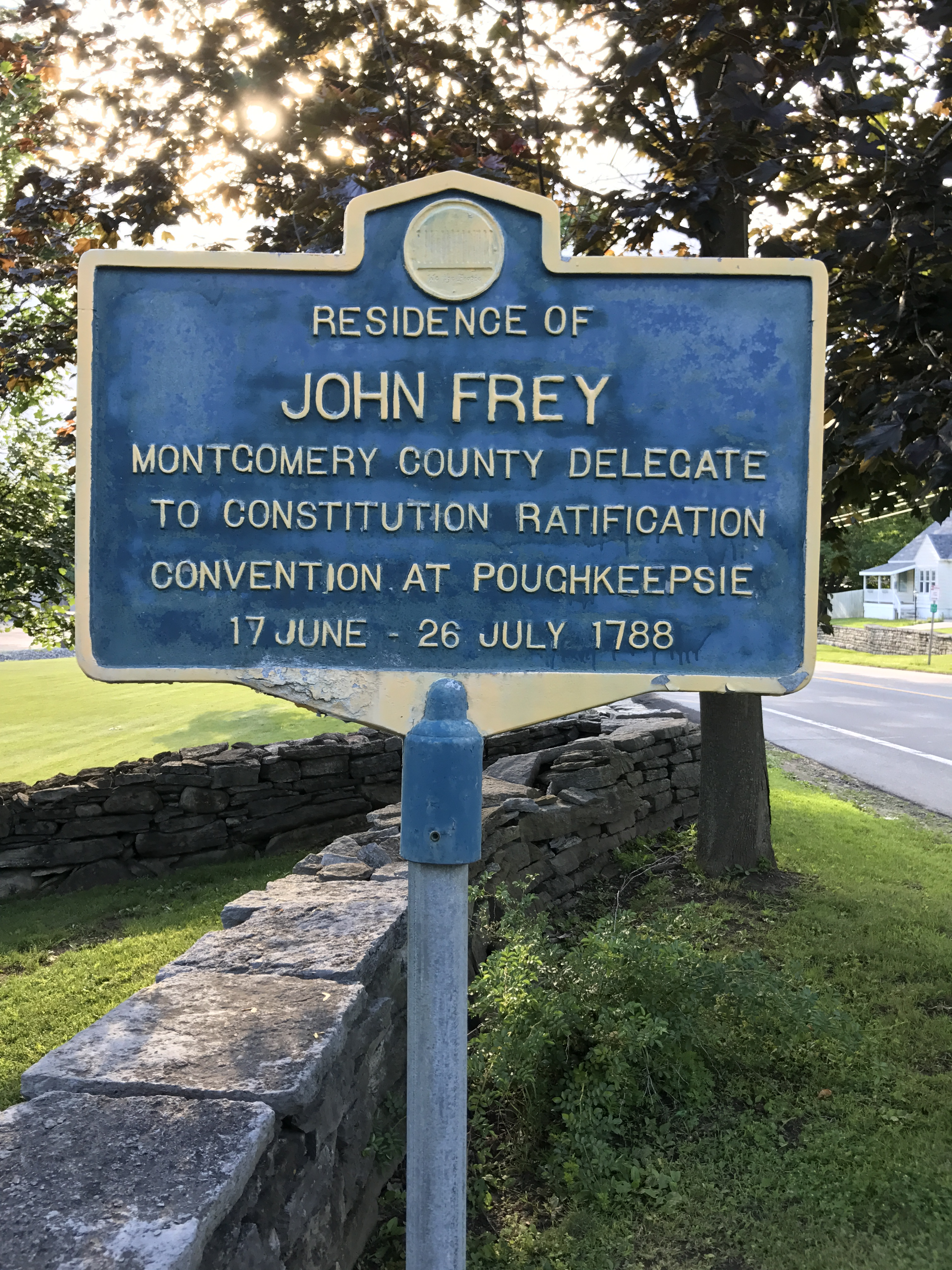
Historic Marker for John Frey
