= Hallsville, New York =

Place in Montgomery County, New York

Coordinates: 42°56′06″N 74°42′13″W

Hallsville is a place in Montgomery County, New York, in the United States.

== History ==
Hallsville was named for Capt. Robert Hall.
