= St. Johnsville (village), New York =

St. Johnsville, New York
- Village
- Location within New York Location within the United States
- Coordinates: 42°59′59″N 74°40′42″W
- Country: United States
- State: New York
- County: Montgomery
- Town: St. Johnsville

Area
  - Total: 0.88 sq mi (2.28 km^{2})
  - Land: 0.88 sq mi (2.27 km^{2})
  - Water: 0 sq mi (0.00 km^{2})
- Elevation: 330 ft (100 m)

Population (2020)
  - Total: 1,643
  - Density: 1,872/sq mi (722.9/km^{2})
- Time zone: UTC-5 (Eastern (EST))
  - Summer (DST): UTC-4 (EDT)
- ZIP Code: 13452
- FIPS code: 36-64639
- GNIS feature ID: 0963694
- Website: sjvny.org

St. Johnsville is a village in Montgomery County, New York, United States. The population was 1,643 at the 2020 census, down from 1,732 in 2010.

The village is in the town of St. Johnsville and lies between Utica and Amsterdam. In 2019, almost the entire village was listed on the National Register of Historic Places as the St. Johnsville Historic District.

== History ==
The area was within the territory of the Mohawk people when Europeans first entered the region. Palatine Germans began settling the area in the early 18th century.

The community was first settled circa 1775. Accounts vary as to the etymology of the name, but most of these credit Alexander St. John, an early surveyor and commissioner, while still others credit an early name for the area, St. John's Church.

A small battle was fought during the American Revolution in 1780 near Fort Klock, which lies to the east of St. Johnsville.

St. Johnsville village was incorporated in 1857.

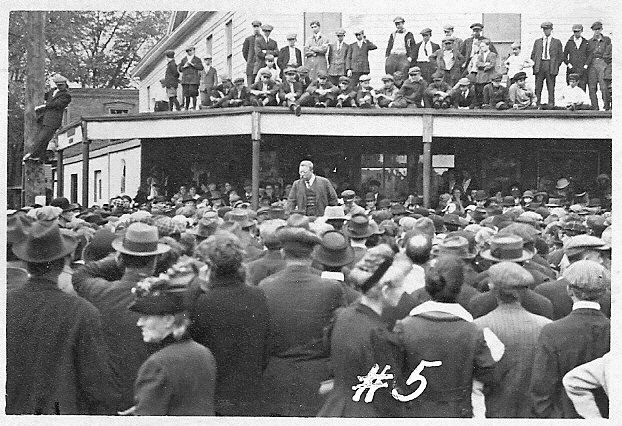
Teddy Roosevelt's campaign speech on October 12, 1914, Saint Johnsville, NY

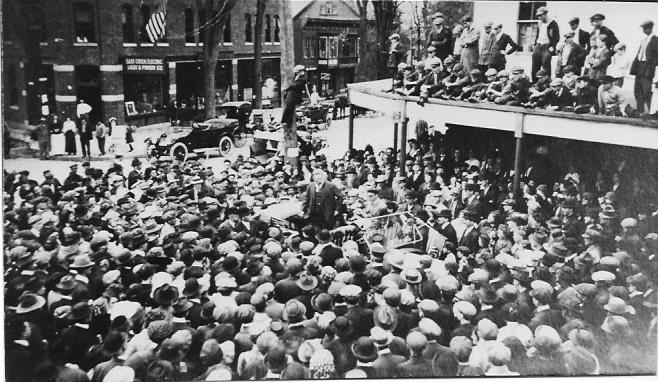
Teddy Roosevelt's campaign speech on October 12, 1914, Saint Johnsville, NY

On October 12, 1914, former President Theodore Roosevelt arrived from the west by auto caravan at Allter's corner in St. Johnsville (where Stewart's is today). He spoke from an auto on behalf of the candidacy of Progressive Party candidate for governor, Frederick Davenport. Local residents surrounded his car on all sides. Roosevelt’s theme was that people should be wary of the old political parties and get rid of Albany party bosses Barnes and Murphy, who were in collusion with one another. The Enterprise said that Davenport was the more impressive speaker as Roosevelt “is evidently unable to cope with outdoor activities at the present time.” The auto caravan moved on, heading for Albany. Davenport lost in November, Roosevelt chose not to run for President in 1916, and the Progressive Party faded away. Governor Franklin D. Roosevelt stopped his car there (the old store had been razed by then) in the fall of 1930 and made a brief address about farm relief and the need for a $50 million bond issue for prisons and to care for the insane. Future Governor Herbert Lehman also spoke to the crowd. Future Governor Thomas Dewey stopped at the Shell station in June 1941, and then visited Pietrocini’s barber shop.

On June 28, 2006, St. Johnsville faced its worst flood in one hundred years.

The Bates-Englehardt Mansion, Stone Grist Mill Complex, and United States Post Office are listed on the National Register of Historic Places. The Margaret Reaney Memorial Library was added in 2012.

== Geography ==
St. Johnsville is located in northwestern Montgomery County at 42°59′58″N 74°40′42″W (42.999674, -74.678386). It is in the center of the town of St. Johnsville, on the north bank of the Mohawk River and the Erie Canal. New York State Route 5 passes through the village as Main Street. The highway, following the Mohawk River, leads east 31 miles (50 km) to Amsterdam and west 33 miles (53 km) to Utica.

According to the U.S. Census Bureau, the village of St. Johnsville has a total area of 0.88 square miles (2.28 km^{2}), of which 0.001 square miles (0.003 km^{2}), or 0.11%, are water. Zimmermann Creek, a tributary of the Mohawk, flows through the village.

== Demographics ==
Historical population
Census	Pop.	Note	%±
1870	1,376		—
1880	1,072		−22.1%
1890	1,263		17.8%
1900	1,873		48.3%
1910	2,536		35.4%
1920	2,469		−2.6%
1930	2,273		−7.9%
1940	2,283		0.4%
1950	2,210		−3.2%
1960	2,196		−0.6%
1970	2,089		−4.9%
1980	1,974		−5.5%
1990	1,825		−7.5%
2000	1,685		−7.7%
2010	1,732		2.8%
2020	1,643		−5.1%
U.S. Decennial Census

As of the census of 2000, there were 1,685 people, 693 households, and 410 families residing in the village. The population density was 1,967.3 inhabitants per square mile (759.6/km^{2}). There were 774 housing units at an average density of 903.7 per square mile (348.9/km^{2}). The racial makeup of the village was 98.87% White, 0.12% Black or African American, 0.53% Native American, 0.18% Asian, and 0.30% from two or more races. Hispanic or Latino of any race were 1.31% of the population.

There were 693 households, out of which 24.8% had children under the age of 18 living with them, 41.1% were married couples living together, 12.8% had a female householder with no husband present, and 40.8% were non-families. 35.8% of all households were made up of individuals, and 20.5% had someone living alone who was 65 years of age or older. The average household size was 2.26 and the average family size was 2.90.

In the village, the population was spread out, with 22.2% under the age of 18, 8.3% from 18 to 24, 23.2% from 25 to 44, 21.4% from 45 to 64, and 24.9% who were 65 years of age or older. The median age was 42 years. For every 100 females, there were 87.0 males. For every 100 females age 18 and over, there were 83.1 males.

The median income for a household in the village was $28,043, and the median income for a family was $37,431. Males had a median income of $28,523 versus $21,115 for females. The per capita income for the village was $14,467. About 11.6% of families and 14.4% of the population were below the poverty line, including 22.7% of those under age 18 and 7.4% of those age 65 or over.
