= Fort Plains =

Fort Plains may refer to:

- Fort Plains, New Jersey
- Fort Plain, New York
