= Fort Plain =

Fort Plain may refer to:

- Fort Plains, New Jersey
- Fort Plain, New York
