= Jeptha Root Simms =

American historian

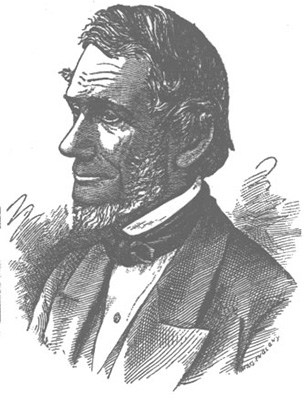
Jeptha Root Simms

Jeptha Root Simms (December 31, 1807 – May 31, 1883) was an American historian best known for chronicling the settlement of upstate New York.

== Personal life ==
Jeptha Root Simms was born at Canterbury, Connecticut, on December 31, 1807, son of Joseph Simms and the former Phoebe Fitch. His family moved to Plainfield, New York, in 1824. He married April 1, 1833, to Catherine Lawyer of Schoharie, New York. He died May 31, 1883, in Fort Plain, New York, age 75.

== Education ==
Mr. Simms was largely self-educated. He became an acknowledged authority on the history and geology of upstate New York through years of personal interviews with the region’s oldest surviving residents and collecting fossils and mineral samples. The interviews became the backbone of his subsequent writings, while his geological collection was eventually purchased by the State of New York for $5,000 (an impressive sum at the time).

== Career ==
As a young man, Simms worked at Canajoharie, New York, but removed to New York City in 1829. A few years later, he returned to upstate New York and began compiling his collection of historical material while working as a railroad ticket agent.

== Bibliography ==
- The History of Schoharie County and Border Warfare (1845).
- The American Spy: Or, Freedom’s Early Sacrifice, A Tale of the Revolution Founded Upon Fact, (1846).
- Trappers of New York, or a Biography of Nicholas Stoner & Nathaniel Foster; Together With Anecdotes of Other Celebrated Hunters, and Some Account of Sir William Johnson, and His Style of Living (1st ed.). Albany, New York: Joel Munsell (1808–1880), printer. 1850 – via Internet Archive.

Re:

1. Nicholas Stoner
2. Nathaniel Foster
1. 1850. LCCN 06-4479. OCLC 8118690.
2. 1851; 2nd ed. LCCN 38-34433. LCCN 06-4480. LCCN 06-4480
3. 1857; 3rd ed.
4. 1960; 3rd ed.
5. 1871; 3rd ed. LCCN 08-7785.
- The Frontiersmen of New York: Showing Customs of the Indians, Vicissituds of the Pioneer White Settlers, and Border Strife in Two Wars (Volume 1 in 1882 and Volume 2 posthumously in 1883)
