= SS Nick Stoner =

World War II Liberty ship of the United States

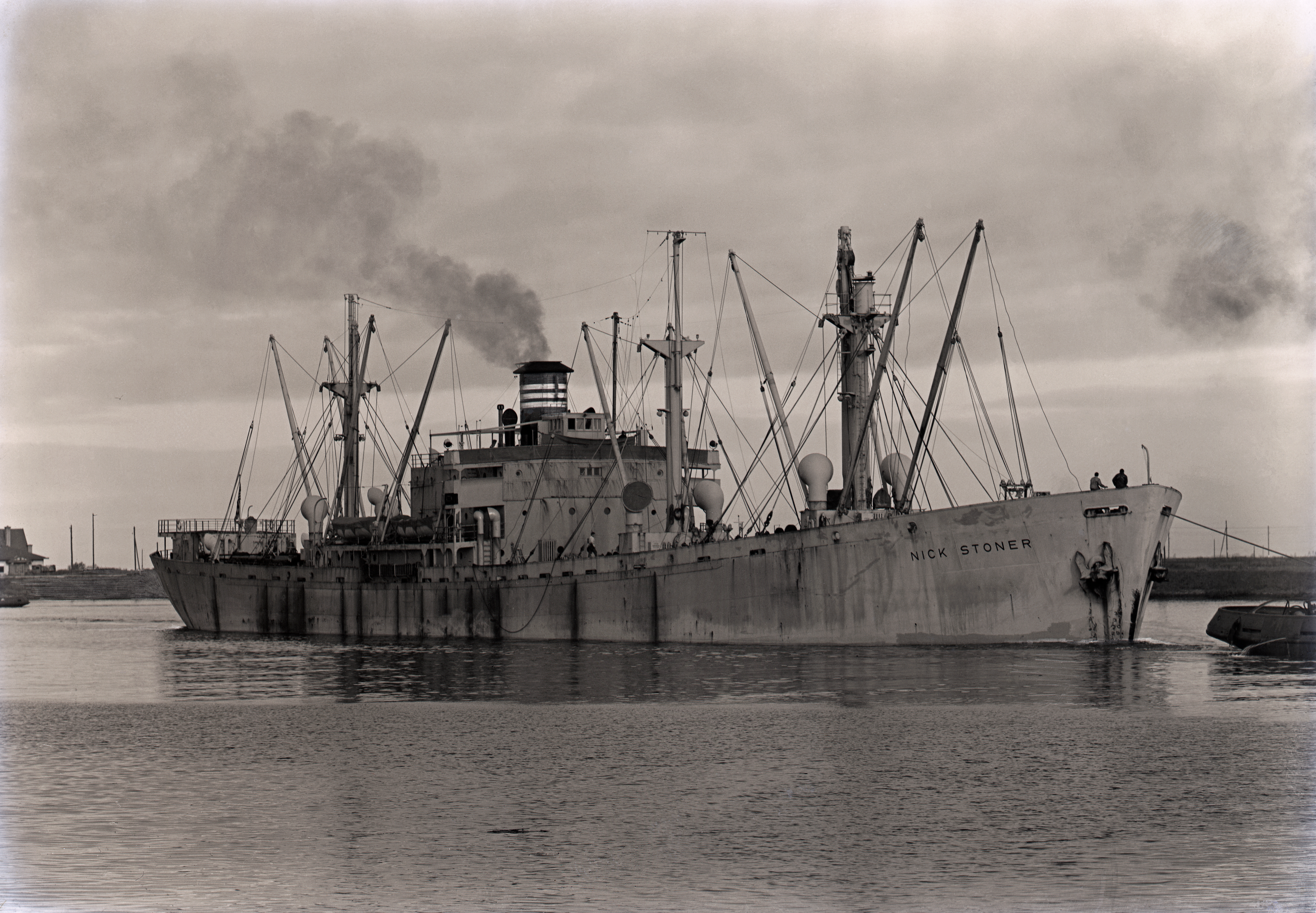
- Nick Stoner being assisted by a tugboat

History

United States
- Name: Nick Stoner
- Namesake: Nicholas Stoner
- Owner: War Shipping Administration
- Operator: North Atlantic & Gulf Steamship Co
- Port of registry: Pensacola
- Ordered: as type (EC2-S-C1) hull, MC hull 2307
- Builder: JA Jones, Panama City, Florida
- Cost: $927,137
- Yard number: 48
- Way number: 5
- Laid down: 12 May 1944
- Launched: 17 June 1944
- Sponsored by: Mrs. Eula Brown
- Completed: 30 June 1944
- Identification: US official number 345900; call sign WQZQ
- Fate: Laid up, 22 October 1948; Sold for scrap, 14 May 1963

General characteristics
- Class & type: Liberty ship; type EC2-S-C1, standard
- Tonnage: 10,865 LT DWT; 7,176 GRT
- Displacement: 3,380 long tons (3,434 t) (light); 14,245 long tons (14,474 t) (max)
- Length: 441 feet 6 inches (135 m) oa; 416 feet (127 m) pp; 427 feet (130 m) lwl
- Beam: 57 feet (17 m)
- Draft: 27 ft 9.25 in (8.4646 m)
- Installed power: 2 × Oil fired 450 °F (232 °C) boilers, operating at 220 psi (1,500 kPa); 2,500 hp (1,900 kW)
- Propulsion: 1 × triple-expansion steam engine, (manufactured by General Machinery Corp., Hamilton, Ohio); 1 × screw propeller
- Speed: 11.5 knots (21.3 km/h; 13.2 mph)
- Capacity: 562,608 cubic feet (15,931 m^{3}) (grain); 499,573 cubic feet (14,146 m^{3}) (bale)
- Complement: 38–62 USMM; 21–40 USNAG
- Armament: Varied by ship; Bow-mounted 3-inch (76 mm)/50-caliber gun; Stern-mounted 4-inch (102 mm)/50-caliber gun; 2–8 × single 20-millimeter (0.79 in) Oerlikon anti-aircraft (AA) cannons and/or, 2–8 × 37-millimeter (1.46 in) M1 AA guns

SS Nick Stoner was a Liberty ship built in the United States during World War II. She was named after Nicholas Stoner, a hunter and trapper who served in the Continental Army during the American Revolution and later the United States Army in the War of 1812.

== Construction ==
Nick Stoner was laid down on 12 May 1944, under a Maritime Commission (MARCOM) contract, MC hull 2307, by J.A. Jones Construction, Panama City, Florida. She was sponsored by Mrs. Eula Brown, and launched on 17 June 1944.

== History ==
She was allocated to North Atlantic & Gulf Steamship Company, on 30 June 1944. On 11 June 1946, she was laid up in the National Defense Reserve Fleet, in Mobile, Alabama. On 14 May 1963, she was sold for $48,765.56 to Union Minerals and Alloys Corporation, to be scrapped. She was removed from the fleet on 17 June 1963.

== Bibliography ==
- Davies, James (May 2004). "Specifications (As-Built)" (PDF). p. 23.
- "Jones Construction, Panama City FL". Shipbuilding History. 13 October 2010.
- "Liberty Ships – World War II".
- Lloyd's Register of Shipping (PDF). Vol. II.–Steamers and Motorships of 300 tons gross and over. London: Lloyd's Register of Shipping. 1945 – via Southampton City Council.
- Maritime Administration. "Nick Stoner". Ship History Database Vessel Status Card. U.S. Department of Transportation, Maritime Administration. Archived from the original on 12 December 2019.
- "SS Nick Stoner ".
