= Bud Fowler =

American Hall of Fame baseball player (1858–1913)

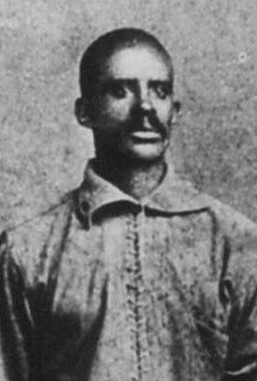
- Pitcher / Infielder / Manager
- Born: March 16, 1858; Fort Plain, New York, U.S.
- Died: February 26, 1913 (aged 54); Frankfort, New York, U.S.
- Batted: Right Threw: Right

Negro leagues debut
- 1895, for the Page Fence Giants

Last Negro leagues appearance
- 1898, for the Cuban Giants
- Stats at Baseball Reference

Member of the National

Baseball Hall of Fame
- Induction: 2022
- Vote: 75%
- Election method: Early Baseball Era Committee

Bud Fowler (March 16, 1858 – February 26, 1913), born "John W. Jackson", was an American baseball player, manager, and club organizer. He is the earliest known African-American player in organized professional baseball. He was elected to the Baseball Hall of Fame in 2022.

== Early life ==
The son of a hop-picker and barber, Bud Fowler was christened John W. Jackson. His father had escaped from slavery and migrated to New York. In 1859, his family moved from Fort Plain, New York, to Cooperstown. He learned to play baseball during his youth in Cooperstown. Biographer L. Robert Davids writes that he was nicknamed "Bud" because he called the other players by that name.

== Professional baseball career ==
=== Early career ===
Fowler first played for a largely white professional team based out of New Castle, Pennsylvania, in 1872, when he was 14 years old. He is documented as playing for another professional team on July 21, 1877, when he was 19. On May 17, 1878, while playing for the Lynn Live Oaks, Fowler reportedly became the first Black player in to appear in a game in organized baseball. On April 24, 1878, he pitched a game for the Picked Nine, who defeated the Boston Red Caps, champions of the National League in 1877. He pitched some more for the Chelsea team, then finished that season with the Worcester club.

Largely supporting himself as a barber, Fowler continued to play for baseball teams in New England and Canada for the next four years. He then moved to the Midwest. In 1883, Fowler played for a team in Niles, Ohio; in 1884, he played for Stillwater, Minnesota, in the Northwestern League.

=== Keokuk ===
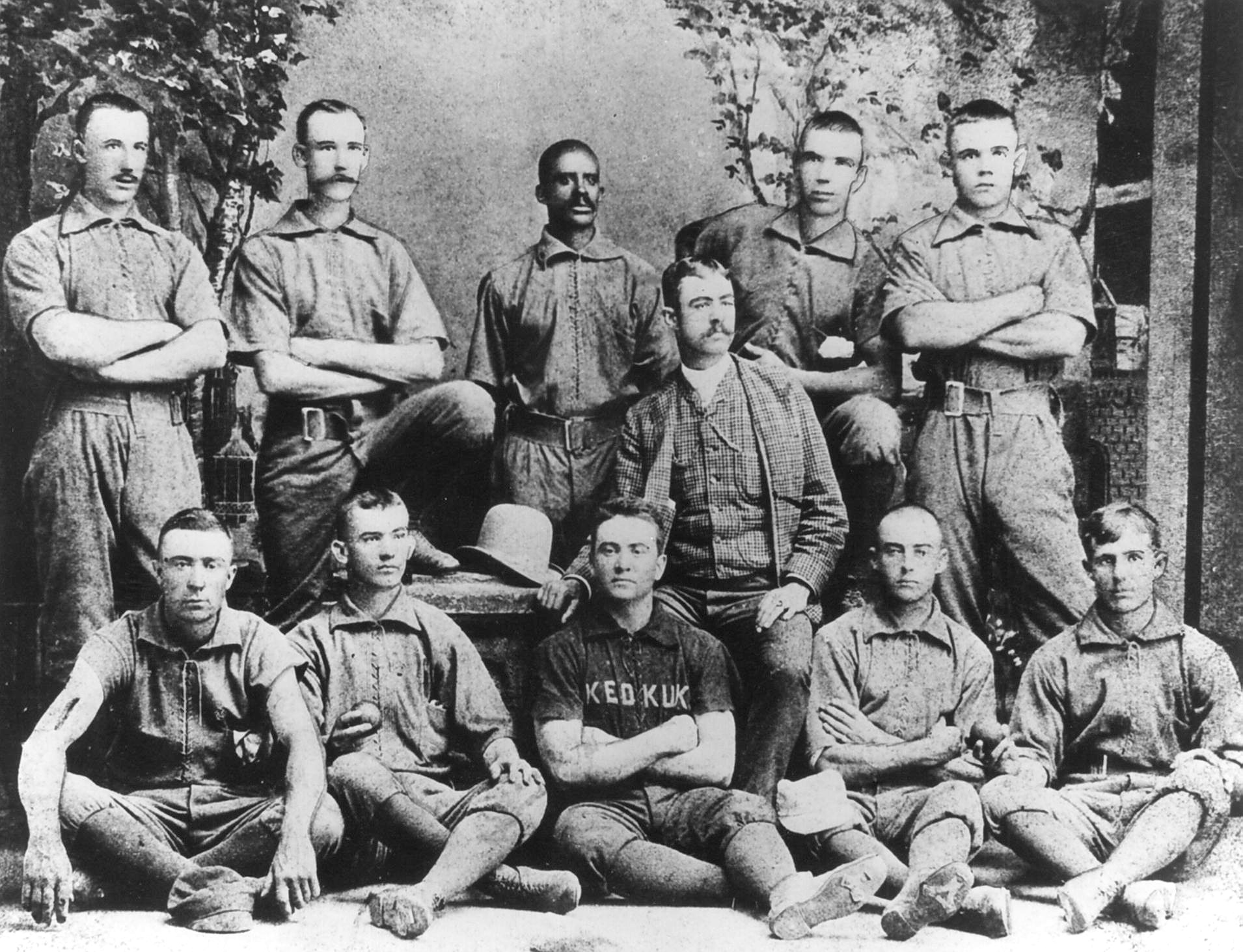
Fowler (top row, center) with the Keokuk, Iowa team of the Western League in 1885

In Keokuk, Iowa, there had not been a professional baseball team since 1875. However, in 1885, local businessman R. W. "Nick" Curtis was the chief force behind starting a new team and hired Fowler for it. Johnny Peters, the manager of the then-disbanded Stillwater, Minnesota team, helped Fowler get connected with the new team in Keokuk, the Keokuk Hawkeyes.

Fowler became the most popular player on the Keokuk team. The local newspaper, the Keokuk Gate City and Constitution, described him as "a good ball player, a hard worker, a genius on the ball field, intelligent, gentlemanly in his conduct and deserving of the good opinion entertained for him by base ball admirers here." Fowler also commented to the local newspaper on issues with the "reserve clause," the contractual mechanism that allowed teams to hold on to players for their entire career. Fowler stated that "when a ball player signs a league contract they can do anything with him under its provisions but hang him."

The Western League folded that season due to financial reasons, leaving Keokuk without a league, and Fowler was released.

=== Later career ===
Fowler moved to play with a team in Pueblo, Colorado. In 1886, he played for a team in Topeka, Kansas. That team won the pennant behind Fowler's .309 average. He also led the league in triples. In 1887, Fowler moved to Binghamton, New York and played on a team there. Racial tensions arose, and his teammates refused to continue playing with him. In 1888, he played for the Crawfordsville Hoosiers/Terre Haute Hoosiers. Fowler played for the 1890 Sterling Blue Coats / Galesburg Pavers / Burlington Hawkeyes, as the Illinois-Iowa League franchise relocated twice. In 1892, Fowler played for Kearney, Nebraska in the Nebraska State League. In 1893 and 1894 he played on the integrated ballclub called the Findlay Sluggers.

In the summer of 1894 Fowler and Home Run Johnson, along with three white businessmen, Len Hoch, Howard and Rolla Taylor, formed the Page Fence Giants in Adrian, Michigan. Fowler played second base for the 1895 Giants but was moved to right field when the team signed Sol White to play that position in June 1895. Fowler apparently had a falling out with the management team and by June 1895, both Fowler and Johnson were simply referred to as salaried players and not members of the ownership group. Fowler played about another month with the Page Fence club and then finished the season with one game with the Michigan State League member Adrian Demons and about 30 games with another MSL team, the Lansing Senators squad. From 1894 to 1904, Fowler played and/or managed the Page Fence Giants, Cuban Giants, Smoky City Giants, All-American Black Tourists, and Kansas City Stars.

According to baseball historian James A. Riley, Fowler played 10 seasons of organized baseball, "a record [for an African American player] until broken by Jackie Robinson in his last season with the Brooklyn Dodgers."

== Later life and legacy ==
Fowler died in Frankfort, New York, on February 26, 1913. In his last years, he suffered from illness and poverty, which was covered by national media. His grave was unmarked.

In 1987, the Society for American Baseball Research placed a memorial on his grave to memorialize and honor his successes as the first professional African-American baseball player. Cooperstown, New York, declared April 20, 2013, as "Bud Fowler Day," dedicating a plaque and presenting an exhibit in his honor at Doubleday Field (it was prepared by the Cooperstown Graduate Program). The street leading to the Field has been named "Fowler Way." On July 29, 2020, the Society for American Baseball Research announced that Bud Fowler was selected as SABR's Overlooked 19th Century Base Ball Legend of 2020—a 19th-century player, manager, executive or other baseball personality not yet inducted into the National Baseball Hall of Fame in Cooperstown, New York.

On November 5, 2021, he was selected to the final ten for the Early Days Committee for consideration in the Class of 2022 in the National Baseball Hall of Fame and Museum. He would need to receive twelve out of sixteen votes on ballots cast by the members of the committee. His election was announced on December 5, 2021, and he was formally enshrined on July 24, 2022, with fellow Hall of Famer Dave Winfield delivering a speech on his behalf.

== See also ==
- Frank Grant
- Moses Fleetwood Walker
- Sol White
- Charles Follis
- William Edward White
