= 2022 Baseball Hall of Fame balloting =

Elections to the Baseball Hall of Fame

National Baseball

Hall of Fame and Museum
- New inductees: 7
- via BBWAA: 1
- via Golden Days Era Committee: 4
- via Early Baseball Era Committee: 2
- Total inductees: 340
- Induction date: July 24, 2022

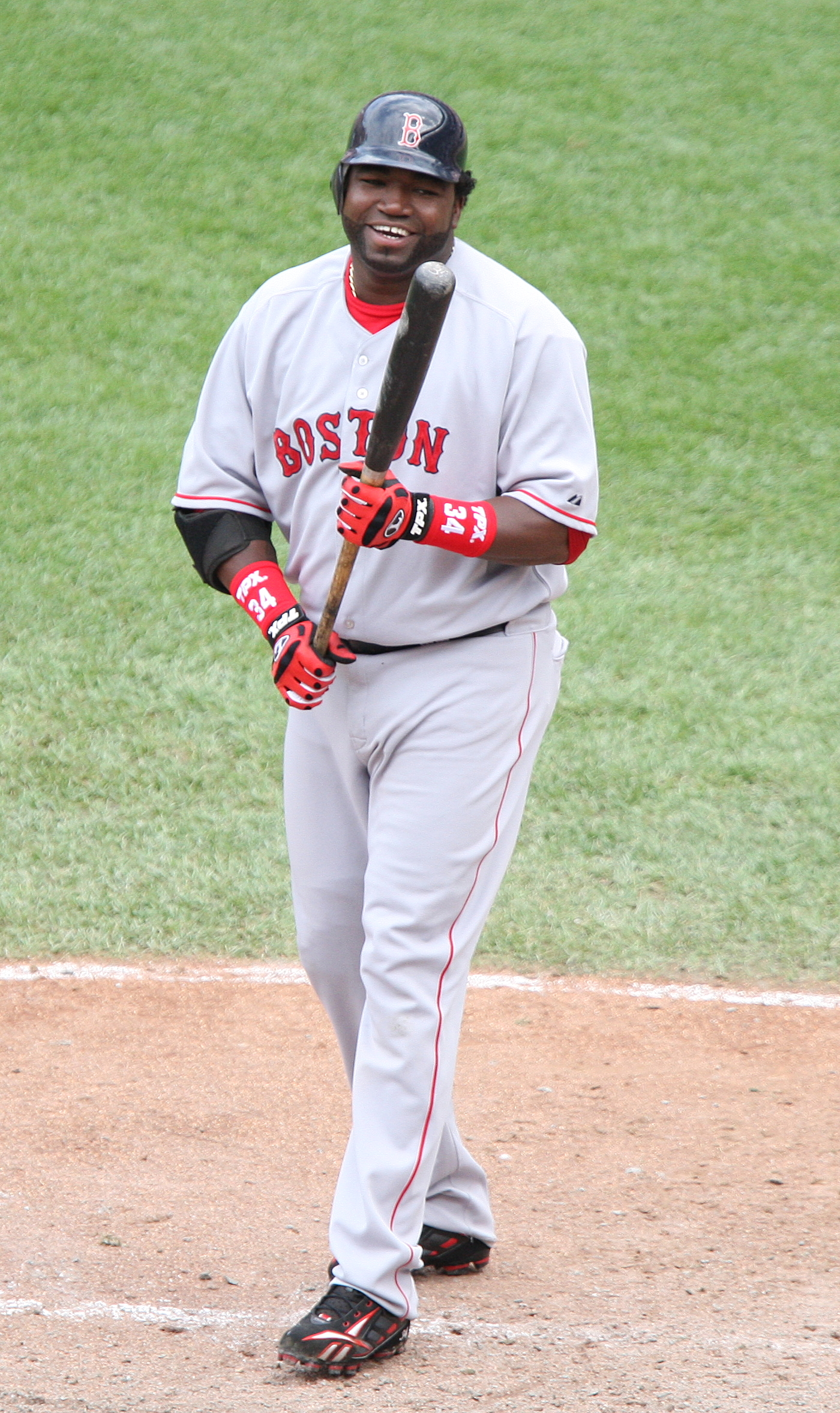
2022 BBWAA inductee David Ortiz

Elections to the National Baseball Hall of Fame for 2022 were conducted according to the rules most recently amended in 2016. As in the past, the Baseball Writers' Association of America (BBWAA) voted by mail to select from a ballot of recently retired players, with results announced on January 25. David Ortiz, in his first year of eligibility, was the only player elected from the BBWAA ballot.

Meetings of the Early Baseball Era Committee and Golden Days Era Committee—two of a group of four bodies generally referred to as the Veterans Committee—who consider players from the 1871–1949 and 1950–1969 eras, respectively, took place in December 2021, having been postponed from December 2020 due to the COVID-19 pandemic. The Early Baseball Era Committee elected Buck O'Neil and Bud Fowler, while the Golden Days Era Committee elected Minnie Miñoso, Gil Hodges, Jim Kaat, and Tony Oliva.

The inductees and other honorees composing the class of 2022 were honored in ceremonies in Cooperstown, New York, on July 24, 2022.

== BBWAA election ==
The list of players appearing on the BBWAA ballot was announced on November 22, 2021. There were 17 players carried over from the prior year's ballot, who garnered at least 5% of the vote in 2021 balloting and were still eligible for election, along with 13 players selected to appear on this ballot in their first year of eligibility, whose final major league appearance was in 2016. A total of 2,801 votes were cast for individual players, an average of 7.11 votes per ballot.

Hall of Fame player ballot for class of 2022
| Player | Votes | Percent | Change | Year |
|---|---|---|---|---|
| **David Ortiz**† | 307 | 77.9% | – | 1st |
| Barry Bonds | 260 | 66.0% | ▲4.2% | 10th |
| Roger Clemens | 257 | 65.2% | ▲3.6% | 10th |
| Scott Rolen | 249 | 63.2% | ▲10.3% | 5th |
| Curt Schilling | 231 | 58.6% | ▼12.5% | 10th |
| Todd Helton | 205 | 52.0% | ▲7.1% | 4th |
| Billy Wagner | 201 | 51.0% | ▲4.6% | 7th |
| Andruw Jones | 163 | 41.4% | ▲7.5% | 5th |
| Gary Sheffield | 160 | 40.6% | –0.0% | 8th |
| Alex Rodriguez† | 135 | 34.3% | – | 1st |
| Jeff Kent | 129 | 32.7% | ▲0.3% | 9th |
| Manny Ramirez | 114 | 28.9% | ▲0.7% | 6th |
| Omar Vizquel | 94 | 23.9% | ▼25.2% | 5th |
| Sammy Sosa | 73 | 18.5% | ▲1.5% | 10th |
| Andy Pettitte | 42 | 10.7% | ▼3.0% | 4th |
| Jimmy Rollins† | 37 | 9.4% | – | 1st |
| Bobby Abreu | 34 | 8.6% | ▼0.1% | 3rd |
| Mark Buehrle | 23 | 5.8% | ▼5.2% | 2nd |
| Torii Hunter | 21 | 5.3% | ▼4.2% | 2nd |
| Joe Nathan†* | 17 | 4.3% | – | 1st |
| Tim Hudson* | 12 | 3.0% | ▼2.2% | 2nd |
| Tim Lincecum†* | 9 | 2.3% | – | 1st |
| Ryan Howard†* | 8 | 2.0% | – | 1st |
| Mark Teixeira†* | 6 | 1.5% | – | 1st |
| Justin Morneau†* | 5 | 1.3% | – | 1st |
| Jonathan Papelbon†* | 5 | 1.3% | – | 1st |
| Prince Fielder†* | 2 | 0.5% | – | 1st |
| A. J. Pierzynski†* | 2 | 0.5% | – | 1st |
| Carl Crawford†* | 0 | 0.0% | – | 1st |
| Jake Peavy†* | 0 | 0.0% | – | 1st |

Key
| | Elected to the Hall of Fame on this ballot (named in **bold italics**). |
| | Elected subsequently, as of 2026 (named in plain italics). |
| | Renominated for the 2023 BBWAA election by adequate performance on this ballot and has not subsequently been eliminated. |
| | Eliminated from annual BBWAA consideration by poor performance or expiration on subsequent ballots. |
| | Eliminated from annual BBWAA consideration by poor performance or expiration on this ballot. |
| † | First time on the BBWAA ballot. |
| * | Eliminated from annual BBWAA consideration by poor performance on this ballot (not expiration). |

This was the final BBWAA ballot for Barry Bonds, Roger Clemens, Curt Schilling, and Sammy Sosa. Schilling joined Jim Bunning in becoming the second player ever to run out of eligibility after having twice received 70% of the vote, but falling short of the necessary 75%.

Players who met first-year eligibility requirements but were not selected by the screening committee for inclusion on the ballot included: Michael Bourn, Billy Butler, Marlon Byrd, Chris Capuano, Coco Crisp, Gavin Floyd, Jeff Francoeur, Roberto Hernández, Omar Infante, Kelly Johnson, Colby Lewis, Kyle Lohse, Javier López, Ángel Pagán, Brayan Peña, Joel Peralta, David Ross, Brendan Ryan, Matt Thornton, Juan Uribe, Ryan Vogelsong, and Jerome Williams.

== Early Baseball Era Committee ==
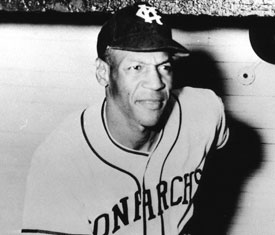
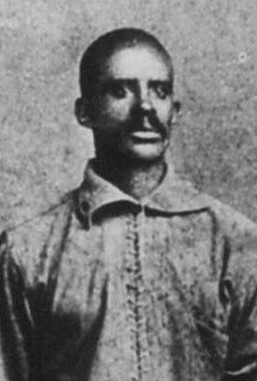
2022 inductees Buck O'Neil (left) and Bud Fowler

The Early Baseball Era Committee met to consider players from the pre-1950 era. The committee was established in July 2016; this was its first meeting to consider candidates for election to the Hall.

Within the Early Baseball Era Committee, the Hall of Fame announced a Special Early Baseball Overview Committee to form a ballot of 10 Negro league players for consideration; the special committee was led by former commissioner Bud Selig in a non-voting role.

The ballot was announced on November 5, and the voting was held on December 5. All 10 candidates were deceased.

| Candidate | Category | Votes | Percent |
|---|---|---|---|
| Buck O'Neil | Executive | 13 | 81.25% |
| Bud Fowler | Executive | 12 | 75% |
| Vic Harris | Player | 10 | 62.5% |
| John Donaldson | Player | 8 | 50% |
| Allie Reynolds | Player | 6 | 37.5% |
| Lefty O'Doul | Player | 5 | 31.25% |
| George Scales | Player | 4 | 25% |
| Bill Dahlen | Player | <4 | |
| Home Run Johnson | Player | <4 | |
| Dick Redding | Player | <4 | |

The committee consisted of the following individuals:

- Hall of Famers: Bert Blyleven, Ferguson Jenkins, John Schuerholz, Ozzie Smith, Joe Torre
- Executives: William DeWitt Jr., Ken Kendrick, Tony Reagins
- Media and historians: Gary Ashwill, Adrian Burgos Jr., Leslie Heaphy, Jim Henneman, Justice B. Hill, Steve Hirdt, Rick Hummel, John Thorn
- Non-voting committee co-chairs: Jane Forbes Clark, Bud Selig

== Golden Days Era Committee ==
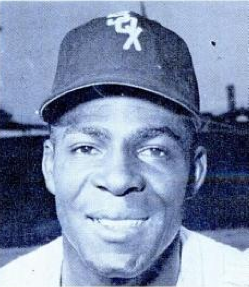
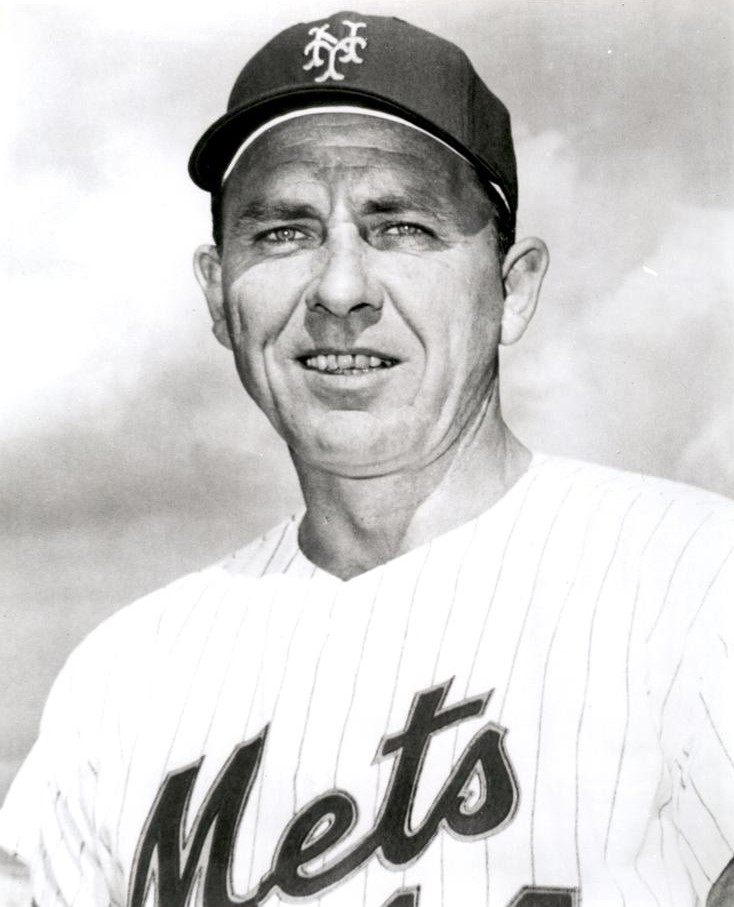
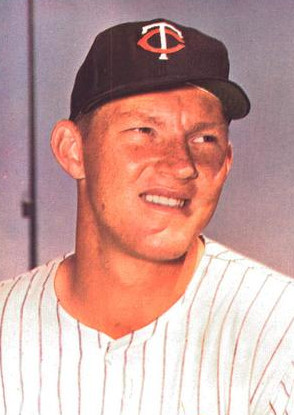
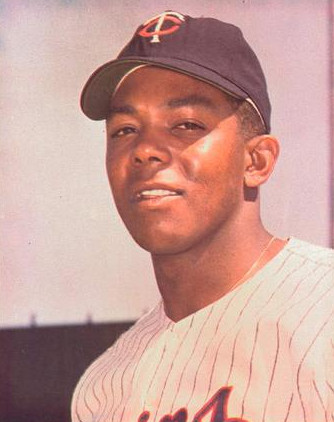
2022 inductees (L-R): Minnie Miñoso, Gil Hodges, Jim Kaat, and Tony Oliva

The Golden Days Era Committee met to consider players from the 1950–1969 era. The committee was established in July 2016; this was its first meeting to consider candidates for election to the Hall.

The ballot was announced on November 5, and the voting was held on December 5. Of the 10 candidates, only Jim Kaat, Tony Oliva, and Maury Wills were still alive.

| Candidate | Category | Votes | Percent |
|---|---|---|---|
| Minnie Miñoso | Player | 14 | 87.5% |
| Gil Hodges | Player | 12 | 75% |
| Jim Kaat | Player | 12 | 75% |
| Tony Oliva | Player | 12 | 75% |
| Dick Allen | Player | 11 | 68.75% |
| Ken Boyer | Player | <4 | |
| Roger Maris | Player | <4 | |
| Danny Murtaugh | Manager | <4 | |
| Billy Pierce | Player | <4 | |
| Maury Wills | Player | <4 | |

The committee consisted of the following individuals:

- Hall of Famers: Rod Carew, Ferguson Jenkins, Mike Schmidt, John Schuerholz, Bud Selig, Ozzie Smith, Joe Torre
- Executives: Al Avila, William DeWitt Jr., Ken Kendrick, Kim Ng, Tony Reagins
- Media and historians: Adrian Burgos Jr., Steve Hirdt, Jaime Jarrín, Jack O'Connell
- Non-voting committee chair: Jane Forbes Clark

== Ford C. Frick Award ==
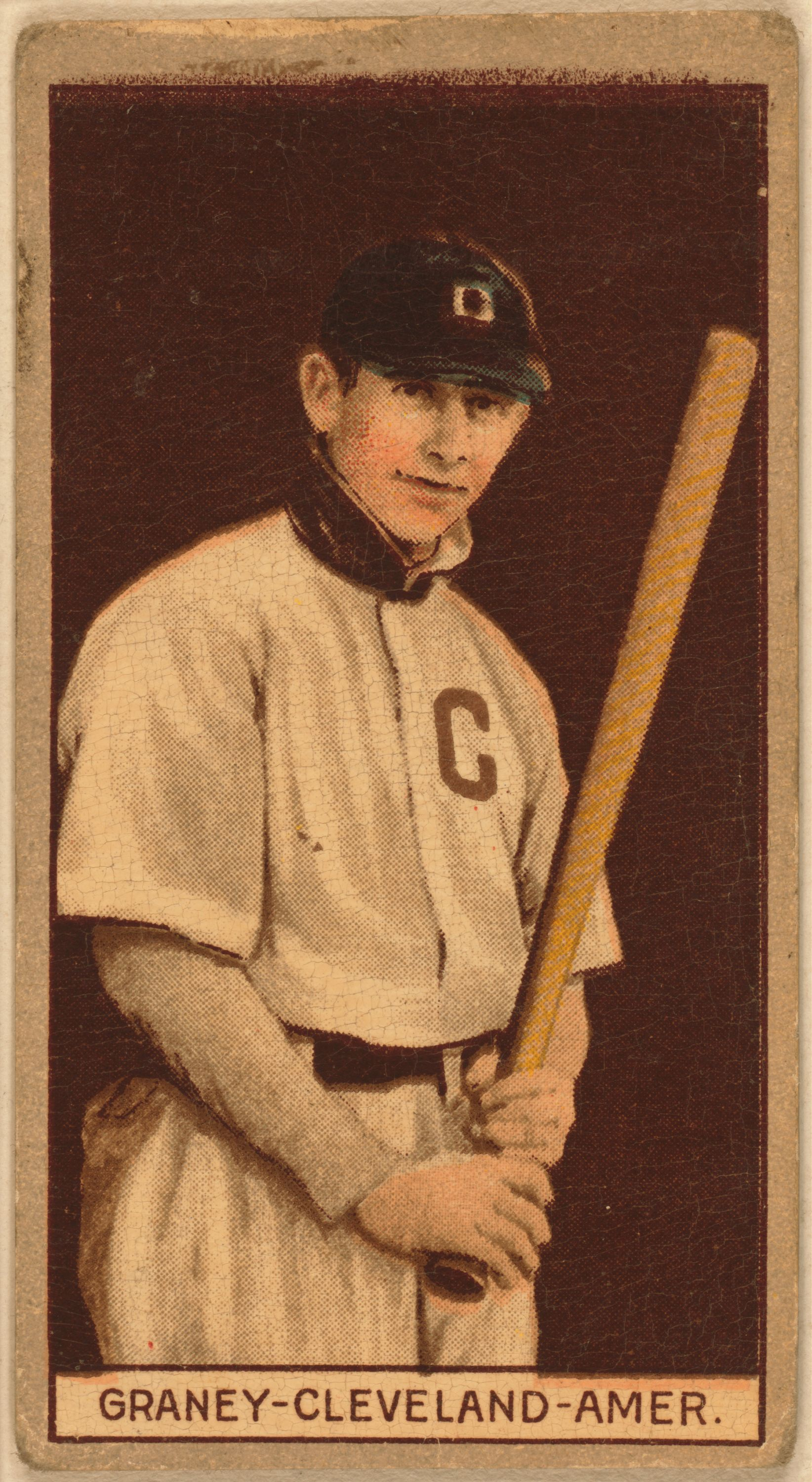
A baseball card of Jack Graney as a player

According to the rules last amended in 2016, nominees in the Ford C. Frick Award balloting were considered from the Broadcasting Beginnings category—"early team voices and pioneers of baseball broadcasting"—one of three categories considered on a rotating basis. The announced finalists, all of whom were deceased at the time nominations were announced, were:

- Pat Flanagan (1893–1963), Chicago Cubs broadcaster
- Jack Graney (1886–1978), Cleveland Indians broadcaster; MLB player 1908, 1910–1922
- Waite Hoyt (1899–1984), Cincinnati Reds broadcaster; MLB player 1918–1938; inducted to the Hall of Fame in 1969
- France Laux (1897–1978), St. Louis Cardinals and St. Louis Browns broadcaster
- Rosey Rowswell (1884–1955), Pittsburgh Pirates broadcaster
- Hal Totten (1901–1985), Chicago Cubs and Chicago White Sox broadcaster
- Ty Tyson (1888–1968), Detroit Tigers broadcaster
- Bert Wilson (1911–1955), Chicago Cubs broadcaster

On December 8, 2021, the Hall of Fame announced that Jack Graney won the Frick Award. The award was officially presented on July 23, 2022, in a ceremony in Cooperstown.

== BBWAA Career Excellence Award ==
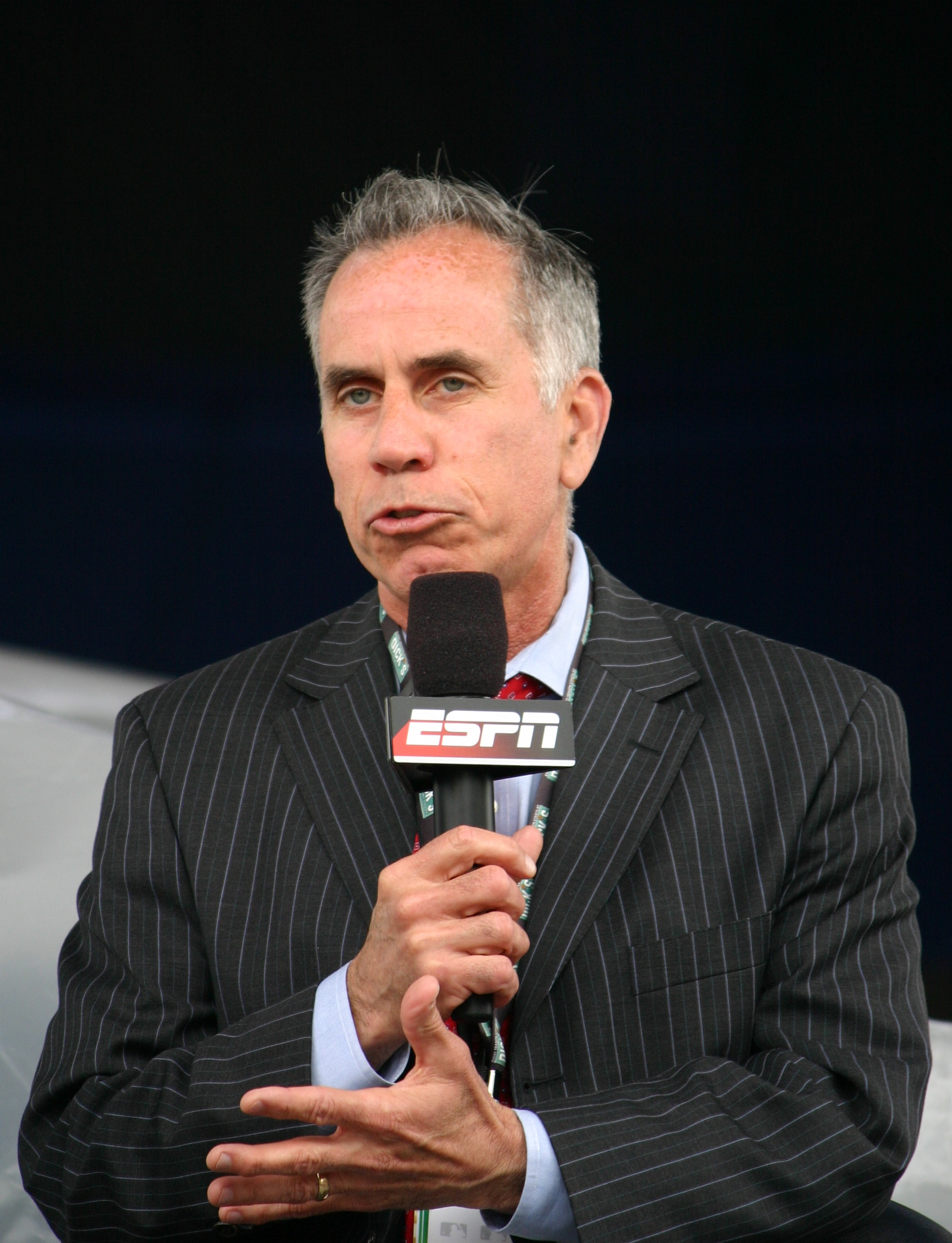
Tim Kurkjian

The 2022 BBWAA Career Excellence Award will also be officially presented on July 23 in Cooperstown, honoring a baseball writer "for meritorious contributions to baseball writing". The award was formerly named for J. G. Taylor Spink, longtime publisher of The Sporting News.

On December 7, 2021, Tim Kurkjian, an ESPN analyst who had a long career as a writer for The Dallas Morning News, The Baltimore Sun, and Sports Illustrated, was named as the recipient. Allan Simpson, founder of Baseball America, and sportswriter Marty Noble were the other finalists.
