= United States Post Office (Fort Plain, New York) =

- US Post Office-Fort Plain
- U.S. National Register of Historic Places
- U.S. Historic district – Contributing property
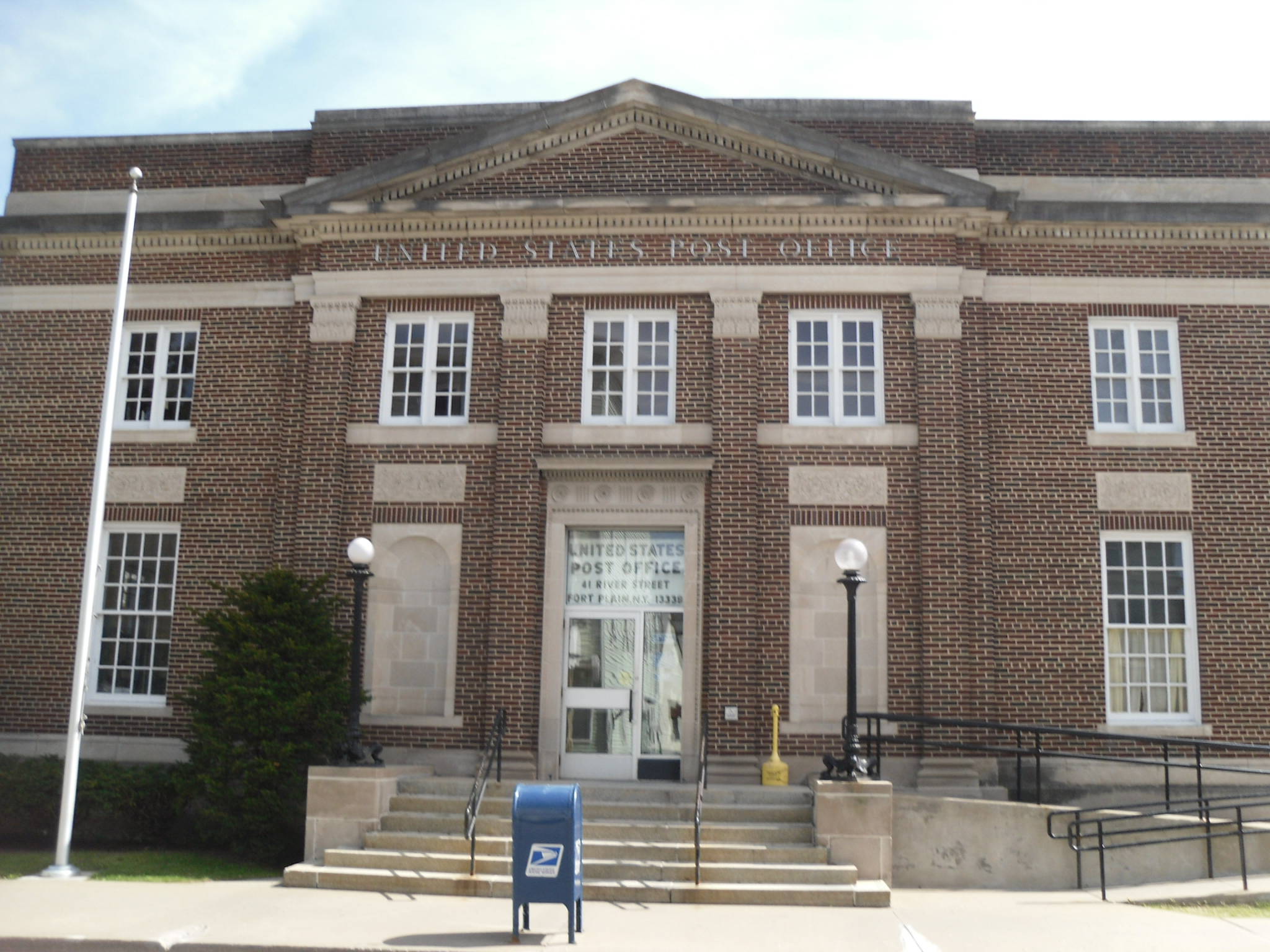
- U.S. Post Office, April 2010

- Location within New York Location within the United States
- Location: 41 River St., Fort Plain, New York
- Coordinates: 42°55′54″N 74°37′23″W
- Area: less than one acre
- Built: 1931
- Architect: Wetmore, James A.
- Architectural style: Colonial Revival
- MPS: US Post Offices in New York State, 1858-1943, TR
- NRHP reference No.: 88002510
- Added to NRHP: May 11, 1989

US Post Office-Fort Plain is a historic post office building located at Fort Plain in Montgomery County, New York, United States. It was built in 1931, and is one of a number of post offices in New York State designed by the Office of the Supervising Architect of the Treasury Department under James A. Wetmore. It is a two-story, symmetrical brick building with a one-story rear wing in the Colonial Revival style. It features a shallow projecting frontispiece framed by four brick pilasters and a pair of Grecian style lamps with glass globes.

It was listed on the National Register of Historic Places in 1989. It is located in the Fort Plain Historic District.
