= Fort Plain Historic District =

Historic district in New York, United States

- U.S. National Register of Historic Places
- U.S. Historic district
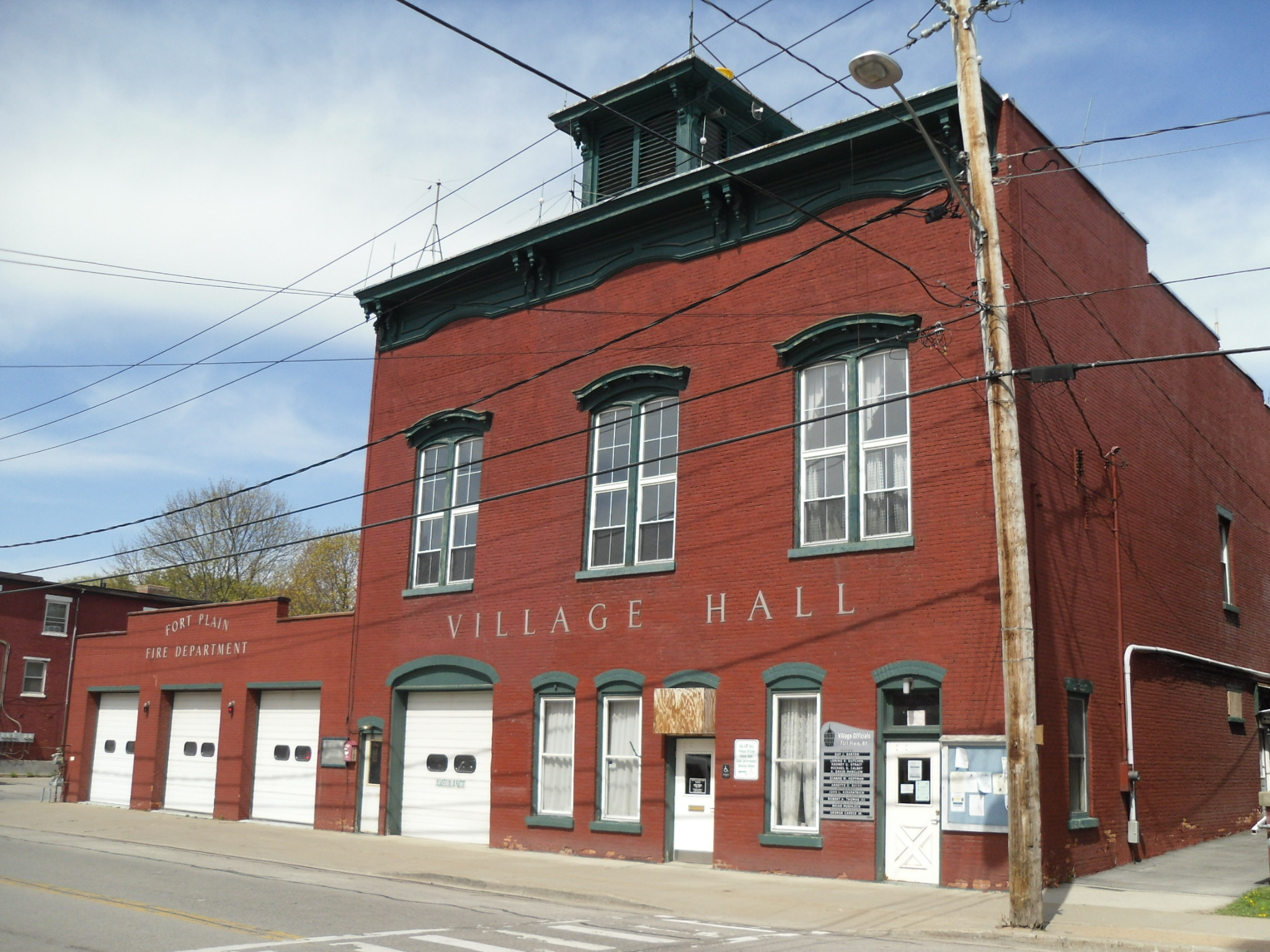
- Fort Plain Village Hall, April 2010

- Location within New York Location within the United States
- Location: Roughly area around Canal & Main Sts., Fort Plain, New York
- Coordinates: 42°55′51″N 74°37′22″W
- Area: 185.66 acres (75.13 ha) (original size)
- Built: c. 1786-1938
- Architectural style: Federal, Greek Revival, Gothic Revival, Italianate, Second Empire, Queen Anne, Beaux-Arts
- NRHP reference No.: 12000510 (original); 100008321 (increase)

Significant dates
- Added to NRHP: August 15, 2012
- Boundary increase: October 25, 2022

Fort Plain Historic District is a national historic district located at Fort Plain in Montgomery County, New York. When first listed it encompassed 536 contributing buildings, 2 contributing sites, 1 contributing structure, and 2 contributing objects in the central business district and surrounding residential sections of the village of Fort Plain. It developed between about 1786 and 1938, and included notable examples of Federal, Greek Revival, Gothic Revival, Italianate, Second Empire, Queen Anne, and Beaux-Arts style architecture. Located in the district is the separately listed United States Post Office. Other notable contributing resources include the Red Mill (c. 1860), Firemen's Home (c. 1830-1840), Methodist Church (1880), Baptist Church (1896), Reformed Church (1887), high school (1915), Nellis Memorial Chapel, Watkins Block (1936), Montgomery Hall (c. 1900), Wick Block (c. 1890), Village Hall (c. 1875), and Fort Plain Cemetery (est. c. 1850).

It was added to the National Register of Historic Places in 2012, with a boundary increase in 2022.
