= Fort Plain Conservation Area =

- U.S. National Register of Historic Places
- U.S. Historic district
- Nearest city: Fort Plain, New York
- Area: 41.8 acres (16.9 ha)
- Architectural style: Greek Revival
- NRHP reference No.: 79001591
- Added to NRHP: November 15, 1979

Fort Plain Conservation Area is an archaeological site located at Fort Plain in Montgomery County, New York.

It was listed on the National Register of Historic Places in 1979.
