= All-American Black Tourists =

The All-American Black Tourists were a Negro league baseball team. They were organized by Bud Fowler in 1899, and were named after a nickname Fowler was given for his talent at stealing bases. The team was remarkable for the fact that the players played in full suits, opera hats, and silk umbrellas.
