= David Ortiz =

Dominican-American baseball player (born 1975)

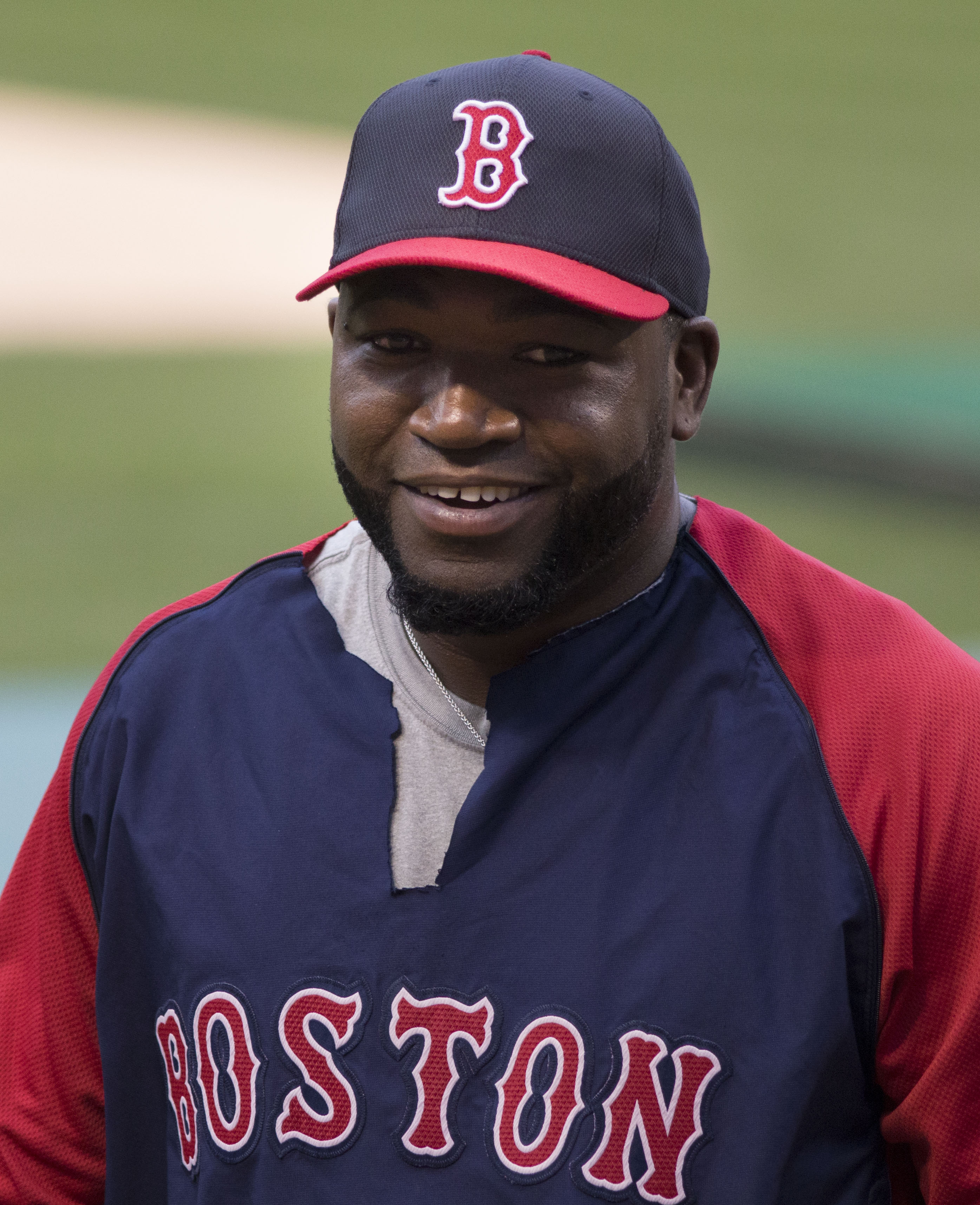
- Ortiz with the Boston Red Sox in 2013
- Designated hitter
- Born: November 18, 1975 (age 51); Santo Domingo, Dominican Republic
- Batted: Left Threw: Left

MLB debut
- September 2, 1997, for the Minnesota Twins

Last MLB appearance
- October 2, 2016, for the Boston Red Sox

MLB statistics
- Batting average: .286
- Hits: 2,472
- Home runs: 541
- Runs batted in: 1,768
- Stats at Baseball Reference

Teams
- Minnesota Twins (1997–2002); Boston Red Sox (2003–2016)

Career highlights and awards
- 10× All-Star (2004–2008, 2010–2013, 2016); 3× World Series champion (2004, 2007, 2013); World Series MVP (2013); ALCS MVP (2004); 7× Silver Slugger Award (2004–2007, 2011, 2013, 2016); 2× AL Hank Aaron Award (2005, 2016); Roberto Clemente Award (2011); AL home run leader (2006); 3× AL RBI leader (2005, 2006, 2016); Boston Red Sox No. 34 retired; Boston Red Sox Hall of Fame

Member of the National

Baseball Hall of Fame
- Induction: 2022
- Vote: 77.9% (first ballot)

David Américo Ortiz Arias (born November 18, 1975), nicknamed "Big Papi", is a Dominican-American former professional baseball designated hitter who played 20 seasons in Major League Baseball (MLB) from 1997 to 2016, primarily for the Boston Red Sox. After playing parts of six seasons with the Minnesota Twins, Ortiz moved to the Red Sox, where he played a leading role in ending the team's 86-year World Series championship drought in 2004, as well as winning championships in 2007 and 2013; he was named the World Series Most Valuable Player in 2013. In his first five seasons with the club, he averaged 41 home runs and 128 runs batted in (RBIs), leading the American League (AL) twice in the latter category and setting the team's single-season record of 54 home runs in 2006; he finished in the top five of the AL's Most Valuable Player voting all five years.

Used almost exclusively as a DH during his 14 seasons with the Red Sox, he was a 10-time All-Star and a seven-time Silver Slugger winner, and became regarded as one of the greatest designated hitters of all time. He received the Edgar Martínez Award as the league's top DH eight times, and set major league records for career home runs (485), RBIs (1,569) and hits (2,192) as a DH. He posted ten seasons each with 30 home runs and 100 RBIs, and batted .300 or better seven times. After a drop in his offensive numbers from 2008 to 2012, he enjoyed a strong resurgence in his last four seasons, and had one of his best years in his final campaign, leading the AL in doubles, RBIs, and slugging percentage, once again leading the team to the postseason.

Upon his retirement, Ortiz ranked sixth in AL history with 541 home runs, fifth in doubles (632) and ninth in RBIs (1,768). Regarded as one of the greatest clutch hitters of all time, he had 11 career walk-off home runs during the regular season and two during the 2004 postseason, the first of which clinched the AL Division Series. In 2022, Ortiz was elected to the Baseball Hall of Fame in his first year of eligibility.

== Early life ==
David Américo Ortiz Arias was born on November 18, 1975, in Santo Domingo, Dominican Republic, as the oldest of four children of Enrique (Leo) Ortiz and Ángela Rosa Arias. As a boy, he followed the careers of standout pitcher Ramón Martinez and his younger brother Pedro, attending games whenever he could and building a friendship with Pedro that would only grow over the years. Ortiz graduated from Estudia Espaillat High School in the Dominican Republic, and was a standout baseball and basketball player there.

== Professional career ==
=== Minor leagues ===
On November 28, 1992, Ortiz was signed by the Seattle Mariners just 10 days after his 17th birthday, who listed him as "David Arias" due to not being familiar with Spanish naming customs. He made his professional debut in 1994 for the Mariners of the Arizona League, batting .246 with two home runs and 20 RBI. By 1995, he had improved those numbers to .332 with four home runs and 37 RBI. In 1996, he was promoted to the Single-A Wisconsin Timber Rattlers of the Midwest League, a Mariners farm team. He established himself as one of the Mariners' best hitting prospects, batting .322 with 18 home runs and 93 RBI. Ortiz also impressed both fans and Mariners' players like Alex Rodriguez with a strong performance in an impromptu home run derby—the result of a failed Mariners' promotion in which the Timber Rattlers were supposed to play an exhibition game against the MLB club in front of their home fans in Wisconsin, but the game was rained out. Also in Wisconsin, Ortiz met his future wife Tiffany; she led him to become a fan of the nearby Green Bay Packers NFL team, a devotion that would become lifelong. Baseball America named Ortiz the most exciting player in the Midwest League, as well as its best defensive first baseman for 1996.

Despite his strong year in the Mariners' system, on September 13, 1996, Ortiz was traded to the Minnesota Twins as the player to be named later to complete an earlier transaction for Dave Hollins. When he arrived in Minnesota, he informed the team that he preferred to be listed as "David Ortiz"—using his paternal family name rather than "Arias" which was his maternal family name. Referring to the switch, sportswriter Jay Jaffe called Arias/Ortiz "literally the player to be named later."

Ortiz rose quickly through the Twins system in 1997. Though he started with the High-A Fort Myers Miracle, he quickly progressed through Double-A (New Britain Rock Cats), to the Triple-A Salt Lake Buzz. At the three levels, Ortiz combined to hit .317 with 31 home runs and 124 RBI, earning a September call-up to the Twins' MLB club.

=== Minnesota Twins (1997–2002) ===
==== 1997 ====
Ortiz made his MLB debut for the Twins on September 2, 1997. He played in 15 games in September, batting .327 in 49 at bats. He recorded his first major league hit in his second game, on September 3, with an eighth-inning pinch-hit double against the Chicago Cubs. He hit his first major league home run on September 14 against the Texas Rangers, off pitcher Julio Santana, going 3-for-4 with two walks in the game overall. Ortiz hit one home run and had 6 RBI in his first season.

==== 1998 ====
In 1998, Ortiz entered the season with his sights set on playing as the regular first baseman for the Twins. However, Ortiz's playing style was somewhat different from the approach favored by manager Tom Kelly, which placed a premium on avoiding strikeouts, and great defense (which Kelly felt Ortiz still needed to work on). While Kelly worked with Ortiz on his defense, he hit well, batting .306 through May 9 before fracturing his wrist and going on the disabled list. He returned to the Twins in July following a rehab assignment to Triple-A and finished the season with the team. He ended his rookie year strong, batting .360 in September. All told, he hit .277 with nine home runs and 46 RBI in 86 games.

==== 1999 ====
In 1999, Ortiz figured to be a fixture in the lineup, but after a tough spring training which saw him bat only .137, he was sent down to the Triple-A Salt Lake Buzz as the sure-handed rookie Doug Mientkiewicz earned the first base job. It was becoming apparent that manager Tom Kelly preferred veteran players or those who fit into his small-ball and good defense philosophy, something Ortiz would later be vocal about after his days with the Twins. While Ortiz tore through minor league pitching to the tune of a .315 average with 30 home runs and 110 RBI, Twins first basemen would go on to hit just .245 with 11 homers and 69 RBI all season. Twins designated hitters did not fare much better, batting a combined .259 with 14 home runs and 82 RBI. Ortiz's strong season in Triple-A was too much for Kelly to ignore, and Ortiz again earned a September call-up in 1999. It did not go well for Ortiz, as he struck out 12 times in 20 at-bats, and did not register a hit.

==== 2000 ====
By 2000, with the Twins coming off three consecutive seasons of over 90 losses, Ortiz's bat could not be buried in the minor leagues much longer. After playing only sparingly during the season's first two months, by June 2000 he finally established himself as an MLB regular. However, Ortiz played primarily at designated hitter as manager Kelly stuck with the veteran Ron Coomer at first base. When Ortiz homered on June 9 against the Milwaukee Brewers, it was his first MLB home run in more than a year. On September 7, he hit his first major league grand slam at Fenway Park against Boston Red Sox pitcher Ramón Martínez, one of his childhood heroes from the Dominican Republic. As his playing time increased, his stats improved. Despite his slow start, he finished at .282 with 10 home runs and 63 RBI. His 36 doubles were second on the team to Matt Lawton's 44, despite Ortiz having almost 200 fewer plate appearances. Ortiz's .364 on-base percentage was fourth on the team among players with more than 100 plate appearances.

==== 2001 ====
Ortiz began the 2001 season as the regular DH and started the year strong, batting .311 with six home runs and 18 RBI through May 4. For the first time in years, the Twins were a contender thanks to a hot start helped by Ortiz's hitting. However, another wrist fracture landed Ortiz back on the disabled list, and he did not return until July. It was apparent the injury affected his production, as he batted just .202 upon his return. He finished the year with a disappointing .234 average, however, the 11 home runs he hit over the season's final two months (including his first multihomer game on September 5 against the Texas Rangers) offered a glimmer of hope for the future. Despite their hot start, the Twins ultimately did not qualify for the postseason but did win a very respectable 85 games. It was the franchise's first winning season since 1992. At the end of the season, longtime Twins manager Tom Kelly retired, and Ron Gardenhire took over the reins.

==== 2002 ====
The offseason proved very difficult for Ortiz, as on New Year's Day 2002, his mother died following a car accident. Gardenhire reached out and helped Ortiz deal with the death, and Ortiz prepared hard for the coming baseball season, both saddened his mother never saw him play at his best and determined to reach new heights. When the season began, Ortiz battled knee injuries. It was a tale of two seasons for Ortiz, as his .240 average with five homers and 33 RBI before the All-Star break was disappointing. But after the All-Star break, Ortiz quietly turned in one of the better second halves in baseball, batting .297 with 15 home runs and 42 RBI. On August 16, he hit a memorable home run off his friend Pedro Martínez at the Hubert H. Humphrey Metrodome, hitting an inside cut fastball into the upper deck. On September 25, he hit the first walk-off home run of his career, against the Cleveland Indians. He finished the 2002 season batting .272 with 20 home runs and 75 RBI. At this point in his career, the home run and RBI totals were both career bests. However, as he batted only .203 against left-handed pitching, Ortiz still was not always guaranteed to start if a tough lefty would be on the mound. His career year coincided with the Twins qualifying for the postseason, as the team won 94 games and upset the Oakland Athletics in the Division Series before falling in the 2002 American League Championship Series to the eventual World Series winning Anaheim Angels. Ortiz batted .276 in his first postseason, with 4 RBI. His 9th inning double in the decisive Game 5 of the Division Series put the Twins ahead 5–1 in a game they would hold on to win 5–4. The series-winning RBI was the first of what would be many clutch postseason hits in Ortiz's career.

After the season, the small market Twins faced a decision on Ortiz, who had made $950,000 and would likely have been granted around $2 million for 2003 by an arbitrator. Rather than negotiate a contract, or go to arbitration, the Twins instead decided to release Ortiz as a cost-cutting move on December 16, after being unable to swing a trade for him. In parts of six seasons totaling 455 games with the Twins, Ortiz hit 58 home runs and had 238 RBI. The player who replaced Ortiz on the Twins' roster, Jose Morban, would never play in a game for the team.

=== Boston Red Sox (2003–2016) ===
==== 2003 ====
After his release from the Twins, Ortiz had a chance encounter with Pedro Martínez at a restaurant in the Dominican Republic, and Martinez remembered the home run he had given up to Ortiz in August 2002. Excited at the prospect of his friend joining him on the Boston Red Sox (who needed a first baseman), Pedro began calling several Red Sox team officials to request that the team sign Ortiz. On January 22, Ortiz signed a non-guaranteed free agent contract with the Red Sox that would be worth $1.25 million if he made the team. New Red Sox General Manager Theo Epstein envisioned Ortiz as one of several candidates to fill a void at first base. Sabermetrics favorite Jeremy Giambi was widely expected to get most of the playing time, but also in the mix were primary third baseman Bill Mueller (who figured to DH at times), Shea Hillenbrand (who could play third base, first base, or DH), and Kevin Millar (who could play first base or outfield). The team's best hitter, outfielder Manny Ramirez, figured to DH at times also. When the season started, all of them made the team, including Ortiz, with the new designated hitter/first baseman taking player number 34 in honor of his mentor and friend on the Twins, Kirby Puckett.

Because of the logjam, Ortiz did not play steadily during the first two months of the season. He hit his first home run with his new team on April 27 at Anaheim, a go-ahead shot to break a 14th-inning tie in an eventual 6–4 win, but batted only .212 in April. By May, he had raised his average to .272. Ortiz became frustrated over his limited playing time, seeing a similarity to what had happened to him in Minnesota, especially considering that Giambi was only batting .125 on May 1. After expressing his frustration to the media, Pedro Martínez pulled his friend aside to defuse the situation, then asked manager Grady Little to ensure Ortiz always be in the lineup when he was pitching. As Ortiz's bat heated up in May, the Red Sox finally broke the logjam when they traded Hillenbrand to the Arizona Diamondbacks on May 29. On June 1, manager Grady Little benched Giambi, who was still hitting only .185. These two moves allowed Ortiz to become the everyday designated hitter. As a regular, Ortiz finally had the breakout year he had envisioned. After hitting .299 with 10 home runs in the season's first half, he turned on the power in the second half, hitting 21 home runs in 63 games. On July 26, he delivered a walk-off hit against the rival New York Yankees. He would add his first walk-off homer as a member of the Red Sox on September 23, against the Baltimore Orioles. He finished the season with 31 home runs, 101 RBI and a .288 average, finishing fifth in the American League (AL) Most Valuable Player (MVP) Award voting as the Red Sox won the AL Wild Card and qualified for the postseason.

In the 2003 postseason, Ortiz struggled in the ALDS against the Oakland A's until Game 4, when he hit a two-run double in the bottom of the eighth inning off closer Keith Foulke to turn a 4–3 deficit into a 5–4 Red Sox lead and eventual victory. In Game 1 of the AL Championship Series against the rival New York Yankees, Ortiz hit his first career postseason home run. He finished with two home runs and 6 RBI in the ALCS, including a solo home run in the eighth inning of the decisive Game 7 that gave the Red Sox a 5–2 lead at the time. However, the Red Sox would go on to blow the lead in the bottom of the inning, and Boston lost the series in heartbreaking fashion on Aaron Boone's infamous extra-inning walk-off home run that instead sent the Yankees to the 2003 World Series.

==== 2004 ====
In the offseason, Ortiz was eligible for salary arbitration once again, but the Red Sox agreed with him on a $4.6 million salary for the 2004 season, avoiding hearings. Prior to the agreement, Ortiz and his agent had submitted a figure of $5 million, while the Red Sox had countered with $4.2 million, so the agreement split the difference.

Once the 2004 season started, Ortiz wasted no time picking up right where he left off with the bat. On May 28, Ortiz hit his 100th career home run, a grand slam, off Joel Piñeiro of the Seattle Mariners at Fenway Park. Also in May, Ortiz signed a two-year contract extension with the Red Sox worth $12.5 million. He batted .304 with 23 home runs and 78 RBI in the season's first half, was named an All-Star for the first time in his career, and hit a long home run in the All-Star Game off Carl Pavano. Ortiz was suspended for three games in July, after being ejected following an incident in a July 16 game against the Angels in which he threw several bats onto the field that came close to hitting umpires Bill Hohn and Mark Carlson. Ortiz finished the 2004 season with 41 home runs and 139 RBI while batting .301 with an on-base plus slugging (OPS) of .983. He finished second in the AL in both home runs and RBIs and finished fourth in AL MVP voting. He also earned his first Silver Slugger award for his outstanding performance at designated hitter. In addition, Ortiz and teammate Manny Ramirez became the first pair of AL teammates to hit 40 home runs, have 100 RBIs, and bat .300 since the Yankees' Babe Ruth and Lou Gehrig in 1931. Together they hit back-to-back home runs six times, tying the major league single-season mark set by the Detroit Tigers' Hank Greenberg and Rudy York and later matched by the Chicago White Sox's Frank Thomas and Magglio Ordóñez. The duo quickly became arguably the best hitting tandem of the decade.

In the 2004 postseason, Ortiz elevated his play to a new level. He had multiple game-winning hits to help Boston advance through the rounds. In the 2004 AL Division Series, he hit a series-winning walk-off home run off Jarrod Washburn in the 10th inning of Game 3 to knock out the Anaheim Angels. In the AL Championship Series against the New York Yankees, the Red Sox quickly fell behind 0 games to 3, a deficit that had never been surmounted in baseball history. Ortiz almost single-handedly paved the way for history, as he hit a walk-off two-run home run against Paul Quantrill in the 12th inning of Game 4 and a walk-off single off Esteban Loaiza in the 14th inning of Game 5. His heroics - namely batting .387 with three home runs and 11 RBI in the series - earned him AL Championship Series MVP honors, the first time a DH had ever won that award, as the Red Sox came back to win in seven games. In the 2004 World Series vs. the St. Louis Cardinals, Ortiz set the tone for the four-game sweep as he hit a three-run home run off Woody Williams in the first inning of Game 1 at Fenway Park. He hit .308 in the series with a home run and 4 RBI as the Red Sox swept the Cardinals to end the Curse of the Bambino by winning their first World Series Championship in 86 years. Overall, Ortiz batted .400 in the 2004 postseason with five home runs and 23 RBI.

==== 2005 ====
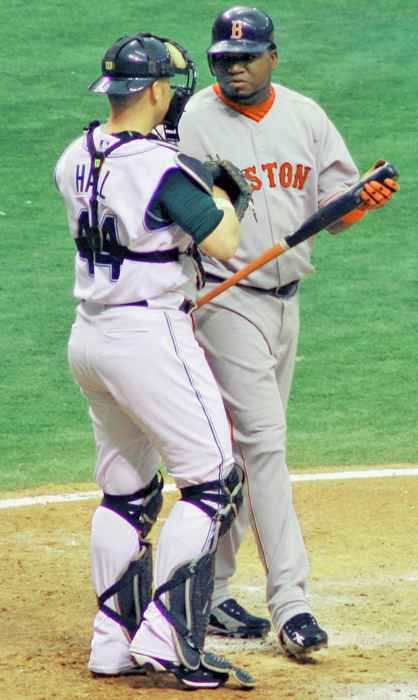
Ortiz (right) with then-Tampa Bay Devil Rays catcher Toby Hall in 2006

In 2005, Ortiz set new career highs with 47 home runs and 148 RBI. He batted .300 with an OPS of 1.001. On June 2, his three-run homer turned a 4–3 deficit into a 6–4 victory over the Baltimore Orioles. On September 6, his 38th home run of the year beat the Los Angeles Angels of Anaheim. On September 29, his eighth-inning home run against the Toronto Blue Jays tied the game at 4, then his ninth-inning single in his very next at-bat gave Boston the win. For all of his late-inning heroics, Red Sox ownership would present Ortiz with a plaque proclaiming him "the greatest clutch-hitter in the history of the Boston Red Sox." He led the AL in RBI, while finishing second in home runs and third in OPS. Ortiz finished second in the AL MVP voting to Alex Rodriguez while leading the Red Sox to their third consecutive playoff appearance, where they lost in the first round to the eventual champion Chicago White Sox. For the second consecutive season, Ortiz was named an All-Star and won the Silver Slugger Award. He also won his first Hank Aaron Award as the outstanding hitter in the AL.

==== 2006 ====
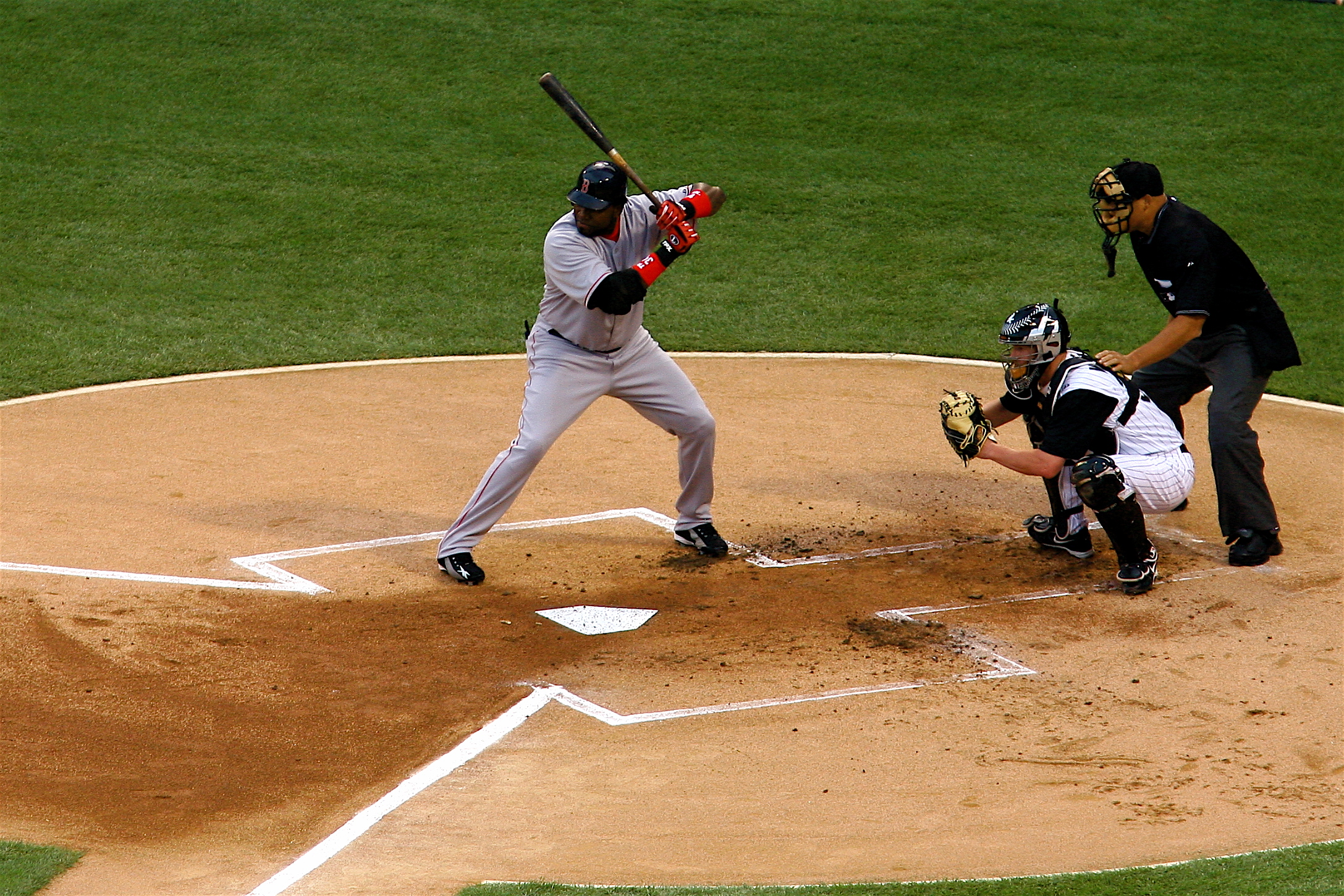
Ortiz batting in 2006

On April 10, the Red Sox announced Ortiz signed a four-year, $52 million contract extension with the team. The contract also included a team option for a fifth year. Over the two months of June and July, he had five walk-off hits, three of which were home runs. Ortiz hit his 200th career home run on June 29, against Duaner Sánchez of the New York Mets at Fenway Park. He posted his best month of the season in July, batting .339 with 14 home runs. On September 20 at Fenway Park, Ortiz tied Jimmie Foxx's single season Red Sox home run record of 50 set in 1938, in the sixth inning against Minnesota Twins' Boof Bonser. On September 21, Ortiz broke the record by hitting his 51st home run off Johan Santana of the Twins. The home run was also his 44th of the season as a designated hitter, breaking his own AL single-season record. Ortiz finished 2006 with a career-high 54 home runs to set a new Red Sox record and had 137 RBIs while batting .287 with an OPS of 1.049. He led the AL in both home runs and RBIs and finished third in OPS. He finished third in the AL MVP voting behind Justin Morneau and Derek Jeter. Despite his outstanding campaign, however, the Red Sox did not qualify for the postseason.

==== 2007 ====
In 2007, Ortiz was instrumental in leading the Red Sox to their seventh World Series title. In the regular season, he had 35 home runs and 117 RBI while batting a career-best .332, placing him in the top 10 in the AL in all three categories. In addition, he hit 52 doubles, led the AL in extra-base hits and finished second in OPS at 1.066. His .445 on-base percentage led the league. An All-Star for the fourth consecutive season, Ortiz finished fourth in the AL MVP voting and captured the Silver Slugger at DH once again, as the Red Sox won the AL East.

In the postseason, Ortiz again kept up the clutch hitting. He batted .714 (5-for-7) against the Los Angeles Angels of Anaheim in the Division Series, with two home runs. Then, after batting .292 with a home run against the Cleveland Indians in the AL Championship Series, he hit .333 in the 2007 World Series, with 4 RBI. Combined, Ortiz batted .370 with three home runs and 10 RBI and Boston swept the Colorado Rockies to win their second World Series Championship in four years.

==== 2008 ====
In 2008, Ortiz started slowly after suffering a wrist injury which caused him to miss several weeks. He played in a total of 109 games and finished the season with 23 home runs and 89 RBI while batting .264. Despite his struggles, Ortiz was named to his fifth All-Star team. In the playoffs, Ortiz batted just .186 over two rounds as the Red Sox ultimately fell to the Tampa Bay Rays in the AL Championship Series.

==== 2009 ====
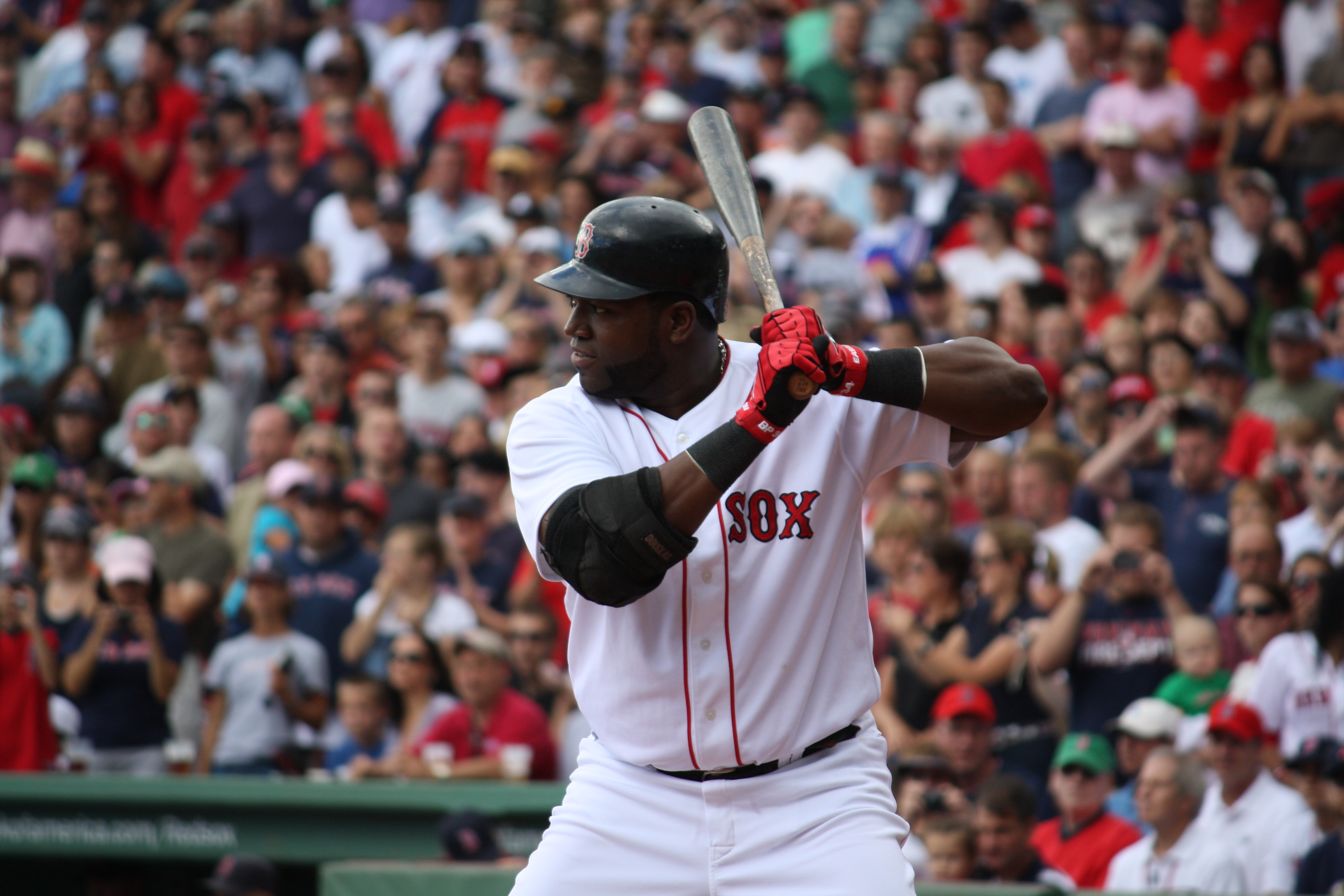
Ortiz batting in 2009

Ortiz struggled early in the 2009 season, hitting only .206 with no home runs and 30 strikeouts in his first 34 games. He did not hit his first home run of the season until May 20 off Brett Cecil of the Toronto Blue Jays, ending a career-high 150 homerless at-bat streak. In June, Ortiz broke out of his slump by hitting seven home runs with 22 RBI. He hit seven home runs in both July and August, including the 300th of his career against Luke Hochevar of the Kansas City Royals at Fenway Park on July 9. On September 17, Ortiz hit his 270th career home run as a DH off José Arredondo of the Los Angeles Angels, breaking the all-time record held by Frank Thomas. However, Ortiz finished the season with just a .238 average to go along with his 28 home runs and 99 RBI. He also struggled in the postseason, with just one hit in 12 at-bats. During 2009, Ortiz did, however, play first base for the first time since the 2007 season.

==== 2010 ====
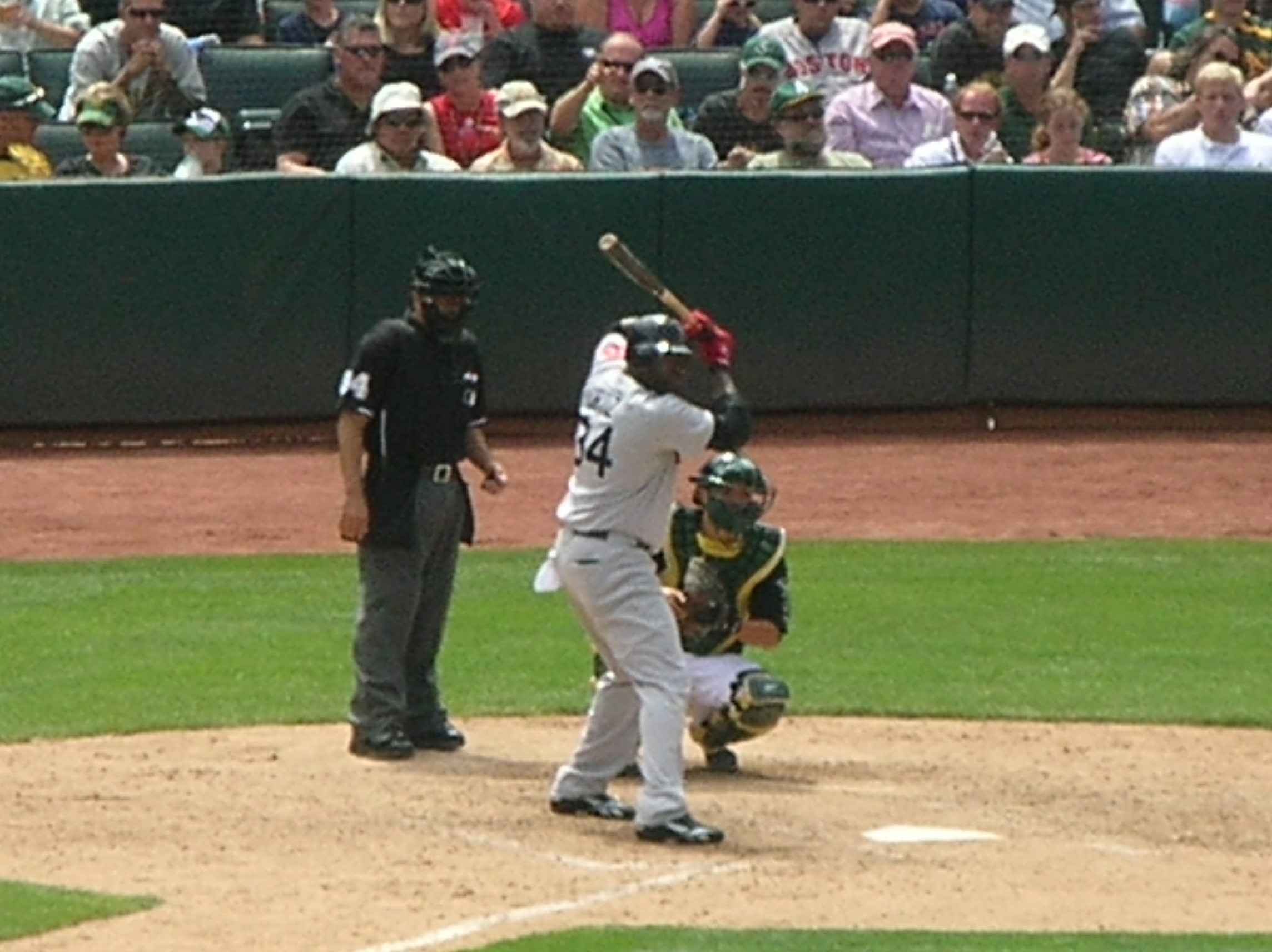
Ortiz waits for a pitch in 2010

In 2010, Ortiz again got off to a slow start, and questions loomed large about his future. Ortiz batted just .143 in April, with a home run and 4 RBI. But Ortiz returned to his All-Star form beginning with a hot May and finished at .270 with 32 home runs and 102 RBI for the year. His home run and RBI totals were both in the top 10 in the AL. At the All-Star Game, Ortiz won the Home Run Derby contest, defeating Florida Marlins shortstop Hanley Ramírez in the final. A strong September where Ortiz drove in 23 runs pushed him over the 100-RBI mark for the first time in three seasons. But despite Ortiz's resurgence, the Red Sox finished third in the AL East and failed to qualify for the postseason. At the end of the season, the Red Sox announced that they would pick up the $12.5 million team option on his contract for 2011, though Ortiz had hoped for a multi-year extension instead.

==== 2011 ====
In 2011, Ortiz continued to produce, batting .309 with 29 home runs and 96 RBI. He passed several milestones during the year. On April 2, he set the record for RBI by a designated hitter with 1,004, surpassing Edgar Martínez. Then, on May 21, Ortiz became only the fifth player to hit 300 home runs as a member of the Red Sox, joining Ted Williams, Carl Yastrzemski, Jim Rice, and Dwight Evans. On July 15, Ortiz was suspended for four games for his part in a brawl that took place on July 8 in a game against the Baltimore Orioles. Ortiz charged Orioles pitcher Kevin Gregg after a brushback pitch and an exchange of words, triggering a bench-clearing brawl. In 2011, Ortiz made his seventh All-Star Team. He also earned his fifth Silver Slugger Award at the end of the year, and, on October 20, Major League Baseball announced that Ortiz was the winner of the Roberto Clemente Award. However, the Red Sox again failed to qualify for the postseason. Also at season's end, as Ortiz and the Red Sox could not agree on a contract extension during the year, Ortiz headed for free agency for the first time since being released by the Twins in 2003. However, on December 7, he accepted the Red Sox offer of salary arbitration, and the two sides again avoided hearings by agreeing to a $14.575 million figure for the 2012 season.

==== 2012 ====
2012 began like Ortiz had his sights set on MVP contention again, as he hit .405 over the season's first month, with six home runs and 20 RBI. On July 4, at O.co Coliseum in Oakland, Ortiz hit his 400th career home run off A. J. Griffin of the Oakland Athletics. However, on July 16, Ortiz suffered an injury to his right Achilles tendon and was placed on the DL on July 19. He returned on August 24 but returned to the DL on August 27 after playing just one game. He finished the season with 23 home runs and 60 RBI while batting .318 in 90 games. On the date of his injury, the Red Sox were 46–44. However, without Ortiz, the Red Sox cratered, going 23–49 over the last two and a half months of the season to finish last in the AL East.

With free agency again looming, Ortiz and the Red Sox agreed to terms on a two-year contract with $26 million, with incentives that could push the total value of the deal to $30 million. The deal was made official on November 5.

==== 2013 ====
Ortiz rebounded from his injury to post a strong 2013 campaign as he once again guided the Red Sox to a first-place finish in the AL East. During the regular season, he hit 30 home runs, had 103 RBI and batted .309. He finished in the top 10 in all the categories in the AL. On April 20, before the first game played at Fenway Park since the Boston Marathon bombing and his first since August 2012 after an Achilles tendon injury, Ortiz spoke emotionally to the crowd and stated, "This is our fucking city, and no one is going to dictate our freedom. Stay strong." Ortiz reached several career milestones in 2013, including his 500th career double on July 2 and his 2,000th career hit on September 4. On July 10, Ortiz passed Harold Baines to become the all-time leader for hits by a DH with 1,689.

On July 27, Ortiz was ejected by home-plate umpire Tim Timmons for arguing balls and strikes in a game against the Baltimore Orioles. After his ejection, Ortiz used his bat to smash a pressbox phone in the dugout. Major League Baseball decided not to suspend Ortiz for the incident.

In the postseason, Ortiz hit five home runs and 13 RBI while batting .353 to lead the Red Sox to a World Series championship, the franchise's eighth. In Game 2 of the AL Division Series against the Tampa Bay Rays, he hit two home runs off Rays' ace pitcher David Price. In Game 2 of the AL Championship Series versus the Detroit Tigers, Ortiz hit a dramatic, game-tying grand slam off reliever Joaquín Benoit in the bottom of the eighth inning, helping propel the Red Sox to victory. In the World Series against the St. Louis Cardinals, Ortiz hit home runs in both Games 1 and 2, had six RBIs and batted .688 as the Red Sox won the series 4–2. He tied a Series record by reaching base nine times in a row, and the opposing Cardinals seemed to stop trying to get him out, with many intentional walks. Ortiz won the World Series Most Valuable Player Award.

Ortiz gained several new nicknames from the media and his teammates as a result of his great postseason play such as "Señor Octubre" and "Cooperstown." He finished third in Boston's mayoral race that year with 560 write-in votes. He also finished 10th in AL MVP voting, the first season he garnered votes since 2007.

==== 2014 ====
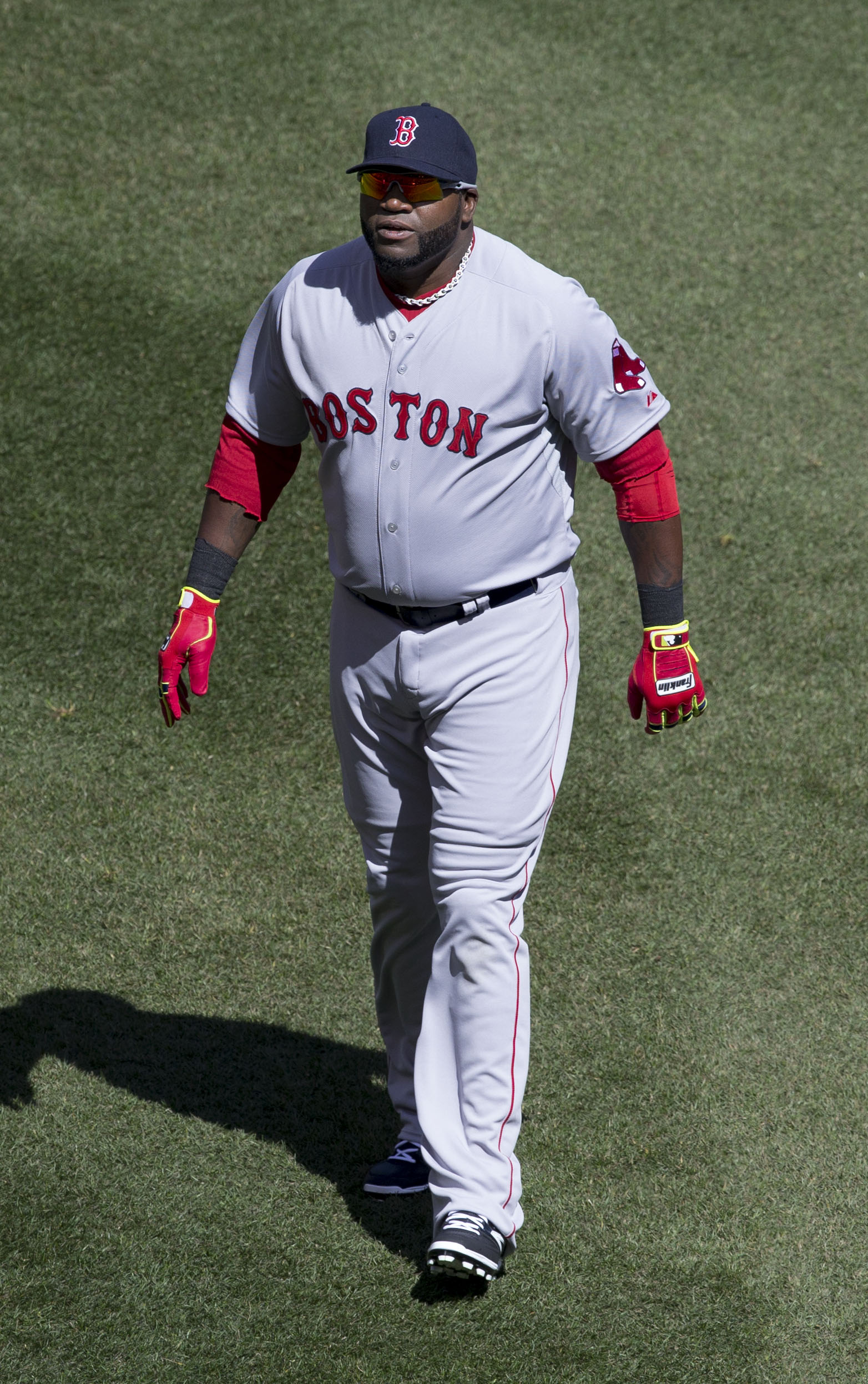
Ortiz in 2014

On March 23, 2014, Ortiz signed a one-year, $16 million contract extension for the 2015 season. The extension also included two team option years to potentially keep him under contract with the Red Sox through the 2017 season. Once the season started, Ortiz continued to hit well, homering 35 times to go along with 104 RBI and a .263 average. He again placed in the top 10 in the AL in both home runs and RBI. During a game against the Tampa Bay Rays on May 31, Ortiz was hit by a pitch from David Price, leading to both benches being warned. Price later hit Mike Carp which led to both benches clearing and an enraged Ortiz shouting at Price. On June 29 at Yankee Stadium, Ortiz homered off New York Yankees pitcher Chase Whitley for his 450th career home run.

In a Boston Globe article, Red Sox great Carl Yastrzemski called David Ortiz the second greatest hitter in club history, stating "I would say as a hitter, I would say he's next to Ted [Williams]."

==== 2015 ====
In 2015, Ortiz hit 37 home runs and had 108 RBI while batting .273. He finished in the top 10 in the AL in both home runs and RBIs for the eighth time in his career.

On April 19, in a game at Fenway Park vs. the Baltimore Orioles, Ortiz was ejected for arguing a check swing call. While arguing, Ortiz bumped into umpire John Tumpane. Two days later, MLB suspended Ortiz one game and fined him an undisclosed amount.

On July 14, in an announcement prior to the MLB All-Star Game at Great American Ball Park in Cincinnati, Ortiz was selected as one of the "Franchise Four" of the Boston Red Sox. The selection of the "Franchise Four" (the greatest four players of all time for every MLB team) was determined by online voting by fans on the MLB.com website. Along with Ortiz, Ted Williams, Carl Yastrzemski and Ortiz's friend Pedro Martínez were selected as the four greatest players in Boston Red Sox history.

On September 5 at Fenway Park, Ortiz hit his 30th home run of the season off Jerome Williams of the Philadelphia Phillies. This marked the ninth time that Ortiz hit 30 or more home runs in a season, the most in Red Sox history. On September 12, in a game against the Tampa Bay Rays at Tropicana Field, Ortiz hit his 500th career home run off Rays pitcher Matt Moore. He became only the 27th player in MLB history to reach that milestone.

==== 2016 ====
On November 18, 2015, his 40th birthday, Ortiz announced on the website The Players' Tribune that he would retire following the 2016 season.

In the final season of his career, Ortiz hit 38 home runs—the most ever hit by a player in his final season—and had 127 RBI while batting .315. He finished in the top 10 in the AL in home runs and RBI for the ninth time in his career. He finished tied for first in the AL in RBI with Edwin Encarnación. Ortiz led the AL and MLB with a 1.021 OPS, .620 slugging percentage, 87 extra base hits and 48 doubles. He had the highest percentage of hard-hit batted balls in the majors (45.9%). He also had the highest ISO (Isolated Power) of all MLB players in 2016, at .305.

Throughout the season, opposing teams honored Ortiz by presenting him with gifts, some humorous, when the Red Sox visited, similar to how teams had done when other stars like Derek Jeter and Mariano Rivera were in their final season. For example, the New York Yankees presented Ortiz with a painting of him at home plate in Yankee Stadium, as well as a book of notes to Ortiz written by several former and current Yankees. When it was their turn, the Baltimore Orioles presented Ortiz with the mangled dugout phone he had destroyed with a bat from his 2013 outburst.

On May 14, at Fenway Park, Ortiz hit a walk-off double to lead the Red Sox to a 6–5 victory over the Houston Astros; it was his 20th career walk-off hit. The double was the 600th of Ortiz' career, making him the 15th player all time to reach the milestone. He also joined Hank Aaron and Barry Bonds as only the third player in MLB history with at least 500 career home runs and 600 career doubles.

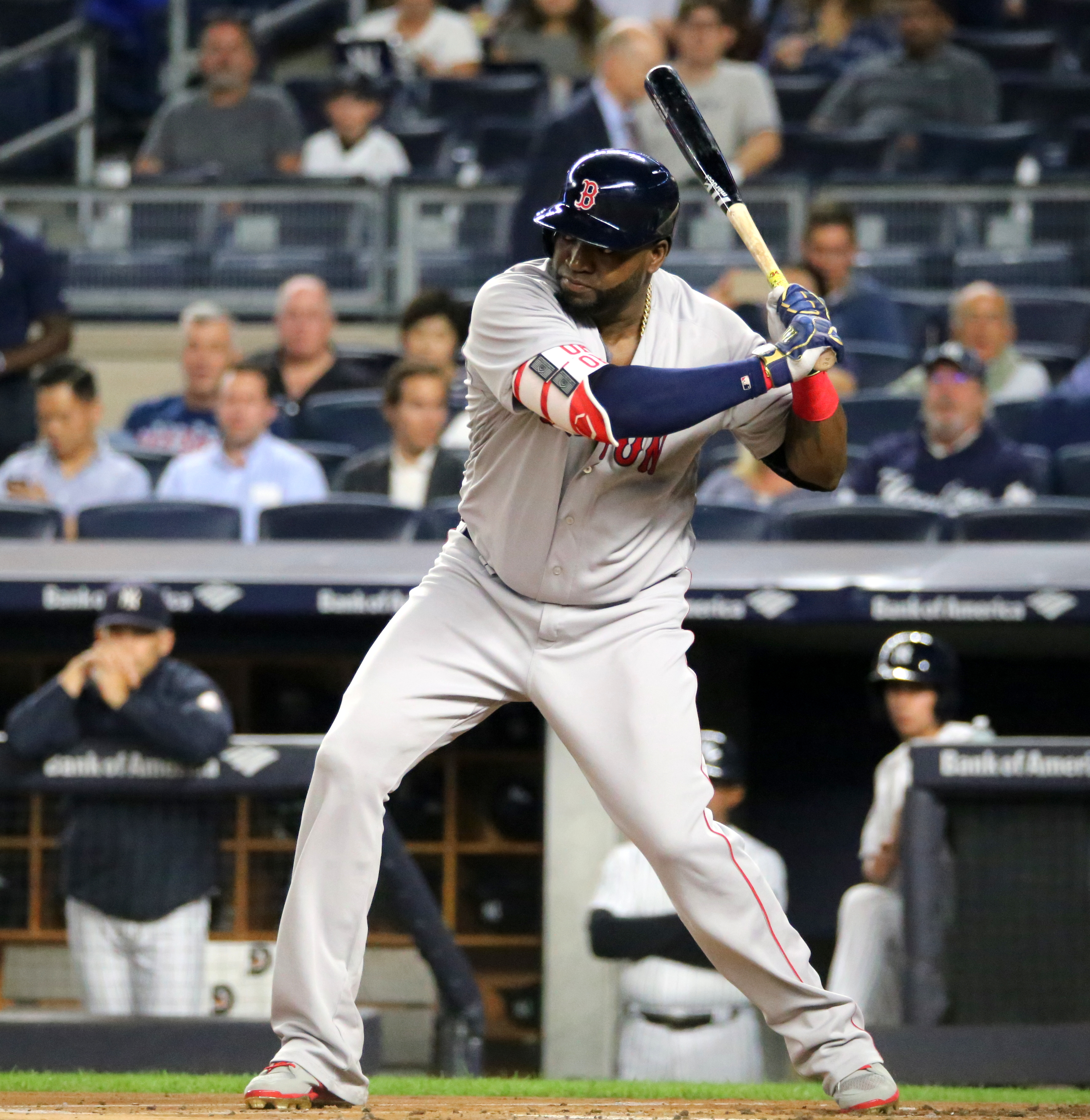
Ortiz batting against the Yankees in September 2016 during the final week of his career

On August 24, in a game against the Tampa Bay Rays at Tropicana Field, Ortiz hit his 30th home run of the season. He became the oldest MLB player to ever do so. In the same game, he also reached 100 RBI for the season. It was the tenth time in his career he reached both milestones, a Red Sox record. He hit his 625th career double two days later against the Royals, passing Hank Aaron for tenth place all-time.

On October 2, during a pregame ceremony at Fenway Park for Ortiz prior to the final game of the season, the Red Sox announced that his uniform number 34 would be retired during the 2017 season. Additionally, Massachusetts Governor Charlie Baker was on hand to announce the bridge that carries Brookline Avenue over the Massachusetts Turnpike would be dedicated in honor of Ortiz.

Ortiz's strong play in his final season was enough to get the Red Sox into the postseason, but a first-round sweep at the hands of the Cleveland Indians in the AL Division Series ended the Red Sox season on October 10. Following the loss at Fenway Park, Ortiz came out and saluted the Boston fans in a tearful goodbye before leaving the field.

On October 26, Major League Baseball announced that Ortiz had won his second Hank Aaron Award as the outstanding offensive player in the AL. He was the 2016 Esurance MLB/This Year in Baseball Award winner for Best Hitter, his third time. In addition, Ortiz also placed sixth in voting for 2016 AL MVP.

=== Alleged PED use ===
On July 30, 2009, The New York Times, citing anonymous sources, reported that Ortiz was among a group of over 100 major league players on a list compiled by federal investigators, that allegedly tested positive for performance-enhancing drugs during Major League Baseball survey testing conducted in spring training of 2003. The survey testing was agreed to by Major League Baseball and the Major League Baseball Players Association to determine the extent of performance-enhancing drug use among players before permanent testing was officially implemented starting in 2004. As part of the agreement, the results of the survey testing were supposed to remain confidential and no suspensions or penalties would be issued to any player testing positive.

On August 8, 2009, Ortiz held a press conference before a game at Yankee Stadium and denied ever buying or using steroids and suggested the positive test might have been due to his use of supplements and vitamins at the time. When asked which supplements he had been taking, Ortiz said he did not know. Ortiz was accompanied at the press conference by Michael Weiner, the general counsel of the Major League Baseball Players Association. Because the list of players was seized as part of a government investigation and is currently under court-ordered seal pending the outcome of litigation, Weiner said the players union was unable to provide Ortiz with any details about his test result, including what substance he tested positive for.

On the same day, both Major League Baseball and the Major League Baseball Players Association issued statements pointing out that because of several factors, any player appearing on the list compiled by federal investigators in 2003 did not necessarily test positive for performance-enhancing drugs. Among those factors were that the total number of players said to be on the list far exceeded the number of collected specimens that tested positive. In addition, there were questions raised regarding the lab that performed the testing and their interpretation of the positive tests. Also, the statement pointed out that certain legal supplements that were available over the counter at the time could cause a positive test result.

On October 2, 2016, at a press conference at Fenway Park, MLB Commissioner Rob Manfred said it was "entirely possible" Ortiz did not test positive during the MLB survey drug testing in 2003. The commissioner stated that the alleged failed test should not harm Ortiz's legacy, and that there were "legitimate scientific questions about whether or not those were truly positives". Manfred added "Those particular tests were inconclusive because "it was hard to distinguish between certain substances that were legal, available over the counter, and not banned under our program." He also said "Ortiz has never been a positive at any point under our program" since MLB began testing in 2004 and that it is unfair for Hall of Fame voters to consider "leaks, rumors, innuendo and non-confirmed positive test results" when assessing a player.

=== Career statistics ===
Years	G	AB	R	H	2B	3B	HR	TB	RBI	BB	AVG	OBP	SLG	OPS	FLD%
20	2408	8640	1419	2472	632	19	541	4765	1768	1319	.286	.380	.552	.931	.990

Ortiz was productive in the postseason. In 85 postseason games including 3 World Series (2004,'07,'13) he batted .289 (88-for-304) with 22 doubles, 2 triples, 17 home runs, 61 RBI, 59 walks, .404 on-base percentage, .543 slugging percentage, and .947 on-base plus slugging percentage.

== Analyst career ==
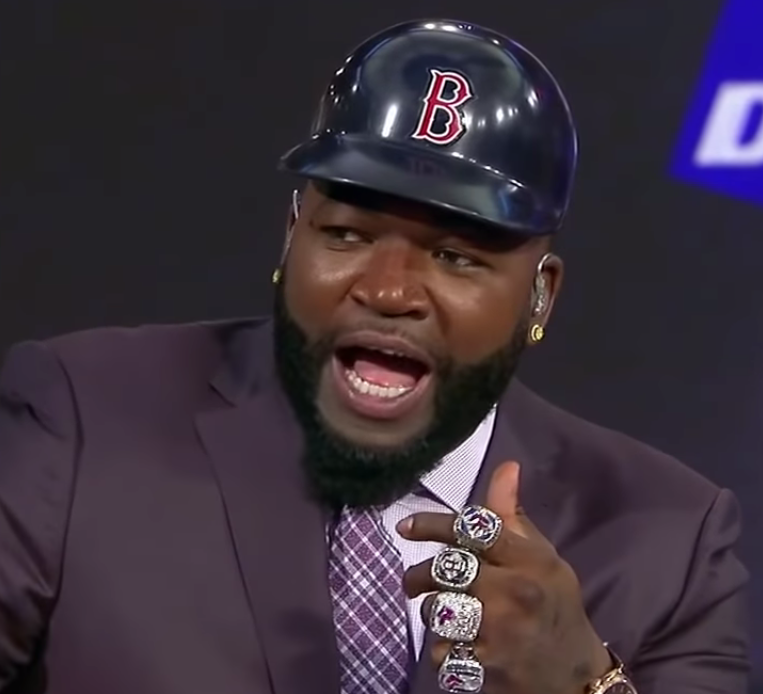
Ortiz on Fox Sports before the 2018 ALDS

In October 2017 Ortiz joined MLB on Fox as a part-time sports analyst for the coverage of the 2017 World Series. He returned in late 2019 as a full-time studio analyst following the June 2019 shooting.

== Television work ==
In 2026, Ortiz competed in season fourteen of The Masked Singer as the alien-like "Googly Eyes". He was the first to be eliminated in the season premiere alongside Todd Chrisley and Julie Chrisley as "Croissants".

== Business ==
Ortiz has received about $4.5 million in endorsements over the years. In April 2007, sporting-goods company Reebok debuted the Big Papi 10M Mid Baseball cleat, which Ortiz first used during the 2007 MLB All Star Game in San Francisco, California.

In October 2009, Ortiz opened a nightclub called "Forty-Forty" in his native Dominican Republic. In April 2010, rapper and producer Jay-Z and his business partner Juan Perez sued Ortiz for trademark infringement, alleging that the name of Ortiz's nightclub was stolen from Jay-Z's chain of sports clubs in New York. In March 2011, Ortiz reached a settlement deal with Jay-Z and Perez.

In 2021, Ortiz, among other high-profile athletes and celebrities, was a paid spokesperson for FTX, a cryptocurrency exchange. In November 2022, FTX filed for bankruptcy, wiping out billions of dollars in customer funds. Ortiz, alongside other spokespeople, is currently being sued for promoting unregistered securities through a class-action lawsuit.

In July 2022, Ortiz launched his "Papi Cannabis" line of cannabis products in collaboration with the company Rev Brands. Ortiz stated: "Cannabis has helped me relax, sleep better, manage stress, and heal physically after a lifetime of playing ball, and I look forward to sharing Papi Cannabis and my personal journey to help people understand its benefits."

=== Podcast ===
In 2018, Ortiz hosted a podcast, David Ortiz: The Big Papi Story alongside Michael Chiklis. The series had four episodes and discussed Ortiz's life and career.

No.	Title	Length (minutes:seconds)	Original release date
1	"The Beginning"	61:53	April 16, 2018
2	"The Rise"	73:29	April 16, 2018
3	"The Hero"	66:18	April 16, 2018
4	"The Legend"	76:44	April 16, 2018

=== Charity work ===
In 2007, Ortiz founded the David Ortiz Children's Fund to support a range of his favorite causes and to help children, from Boston to the Dominican Republic and beyond. In 2008, Ortiz allowed his likeness to be used on a charity wine label, called Vintage Papi, with proceeds going to the Children's Fund. In 2016, Ortiz joined UNICEF Kid Power as a brand ambassador Kid Power Champion for a global mission in Burkina Faso. A 2017 roast of Ortiz raised $335,000 for his Children's Fund.

== Personal life ==
Ortiz's nickname "Big Papi" originates from his habit of calling people (and teammates) whose names he could not remember "Papi." The nickname was given to him by Red Sox broadcaster Jerry Remy.

On June 11, 2008, Ortiz became a United States citizen at John F. Kennedy Library in Boston.

Ortiz is a fan of the Boston Celtics and convinced Dominican NBA player Al Horford to sign with the Celtics in 2016.

=== Family ===
Each time Ortiz crossed the plate after hitting a home run, he would look up and point both index fingers to the sky in tribute to his mother, who died in a car crash in January 2002 at the age of 46. Ortiz also has a tattoo of his mother on his biceps.

Ortiz and his ex-wife, Tiffany, have three children. He also has a son, David Andres (also known as David Ortiz Jr.), with Fary Almanzar, who lives in the Dominican Republic. Ortiz and Tiffany finalized their divorce in 2023.

Ortiz proposed to his girlfriend Maria Yeribel in March 2025. The couple have a son who was born in 2024.

Ortiz's daughter graduated from Berklee College of Music in Boston in 2023. She sang the national anthem before the 2016 Red Sox home opener on April 11, 2016, and she did the same before her father was inducted into the National Baseball Hall of Fame in the 2022 induction ceremony on July 24, 2022. Another son, D'Angelo Ortiz, played baseball at Westminster Christian School in Palmetto Bay, Florida, and he graduated in 2022. After playing baseball at Miami Dade College, he was drafted by the Red Sox in the 19th round of the 2024 Major League Baseball draft. In August 2024, David Jr. was signed as an international free agent by the Texas Rangers.

=== Politics ===
In a September 2016 interview, Ortiz commented that remarks about Mexican immigrants made by then-candidate Donald Trump during his campaign in that year's United States presidential election "didn't sit well with me", calling them a "slap in the face" to Latinos. In 2025, Ortiz made his first-ever political endorsement, encouraging Boston voters to re-elect Michelle Wu as mayor in the city's mayoral election.

=== June 2019 shooting ===
On June 9, 2019, Ortiz was shot and severely wounded while at the Dial Bar and Lounge in East Santo Domingo, Dominican Republic. Authorities stated that Ortiz was "ambushed by a man who got off a motorcycle" and shot him in the back. Ortiz underwent a six-hour operation where a portion of his intestines and colon, as well as his gallbladder, were removed; liver damage was also reported. He underwent a second surgery in Boston on June 10 and was released from the hospital on July 26, following a third surgery.

=== Restraining order ===
A restraining order was issued on May 21, 2020, against Ortiz by Fary Almanzar Fernandez, who is the mother of Ortiz's oldest son. Ortiz was ordered to refrain from "annoying, intimidating or threatening his former partner in person or by phone." According to Ortiz's former partner, he "intimidated and threatened" her.

== Career highlights ==
=== Championships, awards, and honors ===
Championships earned or shared
Title	Times	Dates	Ref
American League champion	3	2004, 2007, 2013	
World Series champion	3	2004, 2007, 2013	

Honors received
Recognition	Dates	Ref
Sporting News MLB All-Decade Team (DH)	2009	
Sports Illustrated MLB All-Decade Team (DH)	2009	

Awards received
Name of award	Times	Dates	Ref
American League Player of the Month	4	September 2005, July 2006, September 2007, May 2010	
American League Player of the Week	6	June 27, 2004; September 18, 2005; August 6, 2006; August 26, 2007; June 5, 2011; September 15, 2015	
Babe Ruth Award	1	2013	
Edgar Martínez Outstanding Designated Hitter Award	8	2003–2007, 2011, 2013, 2016	
Hank Aaron Award	2	2005, 2016	
Home Run Derby winner	1	2010	
League Championship Series Most Valuable Player Award	1	2004	
Major League Baseball All-Star	10	2004−2008, 2010−2013, 2016	
Roberto Clemente Award	1	2011	
Silver Slugger Award at designated hitter	7	2004–2007, 2011, 2013, 2016	
This Year in Baseball Award for Hitter of the Year	3	2004, 2005, 2016	
Thomas A. Yawkey Boston Red Sox Most Valuable Player Award	5	2004–2006, 2013–2014	
World Series Most Valuable Player Award	1	2013	

=== Records ===
- Red Sox single-season home-run leader (54; 2006)
- Tied with Babe Ruth for AL single-season home run record in road games (32; 2006)
- Tied for all-time postseason consecutive on-base streak; 10 in 2007 (Billy Hatcher in 1990)
- Tied World Series record with on-base streak of nine in a row
- Twice set single season record for home runs by a designated hitter: first in 2005 (43), then again in 2006 (47)
- First player ever to hit two walk-off home runs in the same postseason (vs. Angels, 2004 ALDS; Yankees, 2004 ALCS)
- First player in Red Sox history to hit 40 or more home runs in three consecutive seasons (2004–2006)
- Ten seasons of 30 or more home runs (2003–2007, 2010, 2013–2016; most in Red Sox history)
- Ten seasons of 100 or more RBIs (2003–2007, 2010, 2013–2016; most in Red Sox history)
- Ten seasons of 30 or more home runs and 100 or more RBIs (2003–2007, 2010, 2013–2016; most in Red Sox history)

=== Distinctions ===
David Ortiz's number 34 was retired by the Boston Red Sox in 2017.

- 27th member of the 500 home run club
- Fourth player with 500 or more home runs and 3 World Series championships (Babe Ruth, Mickey Mantle, Reggie Jackson)
- One of five players in MLB history with 500 or more home runs and 600 or more doubles (Barry Bonds, Hank Aaron, Albert Pujols, Miguel Cabrera)
- Third player with 85 extra base hits or more for four consecutive years (Lou Gehrig, 5; Sammy Sosa, 4)
- Third player in Red Sox history with three seasons of 40 or more home runs (Carl Yastrzemski and Manny Ramirez)
- 17 career postseason home runs (tied for 15th all-time in MLB history)
- 61 career postseason RBI (tied for fifth all-time in MLB history)
- Most home runs by a player in his final season (38)

=== Annual statistical achievements ===
American League statistical leader
Category	Times	Dates	Ref
Bases on balls leader	2	2006, 2007	
Doubles leader	1	2016	
Extra base hits leader	4	2004, 2005, 2007, 2016	
Home run leader	1	2006	
On-base percentage leader	1	2007	
On-base plus slugging leader	1	2016	
Runs batted in leader	3	2005, 2006, 2016	
Slugging percentage leader	1	2016	
Total bases leader	1	2006	

=== Other accomplishments ===
- Ortiz's home run total increased each year from 2000 to 2006, starting with 10 home runs, and ending with 54
- Hit 11 career regular season walk-off home runs (tied 8th all time with Tony Perez and Ryan Zimmerman), and one of two players (the other being Bernie Williams) with two in the postseason (2004 ALDS, 2004 ALCS)
- Five-time top five MVP vote-receiver (5th, 2003; 4th, 2004; 2nd, 2005; 3rd, 2006; 4th, 2007)

=== National Baseball Hall of Fame ===
Ortiz became eligible to appear on the 2022 ballot for the National Baseball Hall of Fame. Ortiz was included on the ballot when it was announced on November 22, 2021. That ballot is also the first for Alex Rodriguez, and the 10th and final ballot for Barry Bonds, Roger Clemens, Curt Schilling, and Sammy Sosa. Various sportswriters viewed Ortiz as being likely to receive the 75% of votes required for induction, in his first appearance on the ballot. On January 25, 2022, Ortiz was elected to the National Baseball Hall of Fame with 77.9% of the vote; he was the only player voted in by the Baseball Writers' Association of America (six more inductees were selected by the Golden Days and Early Baseball Era committees). He was formally inducted on July 24, 2022.

== See also ==
- 50 home run club
- 500 home run club
- Boston Red Sox all-time roster
- List of Afro-Latinos
- List of Boston Red Sox award winners
- List of Major League Baseball annual home run leaders
- List of Major League Baseball annual runs batted in leaders
- List of Major League Baseball career bases on balls leaders
- List of Major League Baseball career doubles leaders
- List of Major League Baseball career extra base hits leaders
- List of Major League Baseball career hits leaders
- List of Major League Baseball career home run leaders
- List of Major League Baseball career OPS leaders
- List of Major League Baseball career runs batted in leaders
- List of Major League Baseball career runs scored leaders
- List of Major League Baseball career slugging percentage leaders
- List of Major League Baseball career strikeouts by batters leaders
- List of Major League Baseball career total bases leaders
- List of Major League Baseball doubles records
- List of Major League Baseball players from the Dominican Republic
- Minnesota Twins all-time roster
- Dominican-Americans in Boston

Awards and achievements
Preceded by Alex Rodriguez; Joe Mauer	American League Player of the Month; September 2005; July 2006	Succeeded by Jason Giambi; Travis Hafner
