= Nicholas Stoner =

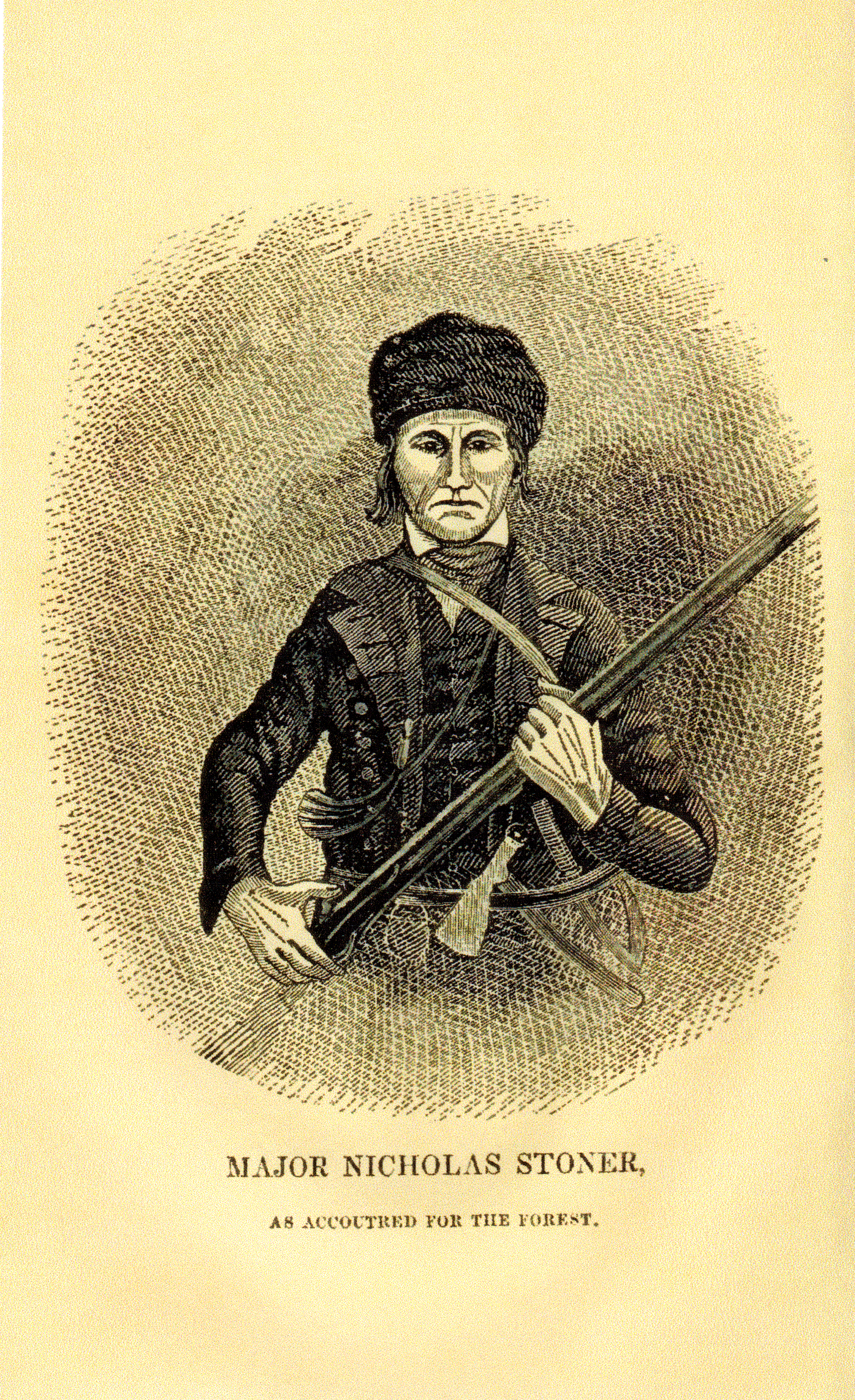
Nicholas Stoner around age 83 in 1845

Nicholas Stoner (Maryland, Dec. 15, 1762–Caroga, New York, Nov. 26, 1853) was a hunter and trapper in the Adirondack Mountains of New York. He served in the Continental Army in the American Revolution and the American forces in the War of 1812. He is buried in Prospect Hill Cemetery, Gloversville, New York.

== Early life ==
Nicholas Stoner was born in Maryland in 1762 or 1763, the son of German immigrant Henry Stoner and Catherine Barnes. During his childhood the family moved to New York City, where his uncle, John Binkus, (Note: During the Revolution Binkus became an officer in Loyalist General Oliver De Lancey's Brigade) paid for his schooling. After a few years the family again moved, to a frontier community called "Fonda's Bush" (now Broadalbin, Fulton County, New York), east of Johnstown and north of Amsterdam, New York.

== Revolutionary War ==
In 1777 Stoner enlisted as a fifer in the Patriot forces in Colonel James Livingston's battalion of the New York Line under Captain Timothy Hughes. His father and younger brother, John, served in the same regiment.

In August 1777 the unit accompanied General Benedict Arnold in the relief of Fort Stanwix. In the fall of that year they fought in the Battles of Saratoga. Stoner accompanied General Arnold in the attack on the Hessian camp in which Arnold was wounded, and Stoner was also wounded on the right side of his head and his ear by fragments of the skull of a fellow soldier killed by a cannonball. Following his recovery he served with his unit in Rhode Island, where his father was wounded and Nicholas captured, but later freed. In 1780 it was said that he was fifer of the guard that conducted convicted British spy Major John André to the gallows, and in 1781 he was at Yorktown for the British surrender.

In 1781 Nicholas' father was released from the army and settled on a farm formerly belonging to Loyalist Col. John Butler at Tribes Hill, New York. Here, in 1782, he was surprised, killed, and scalped by a raiding party of Indians.

In 1783 Nicholas accompanied Col. Marinus Willett to New York City upon its evacuation by the British.

== Post war ==
After the war Stoner returned to Johnstown and married his old flame, Anna Mason, now a young widow with a baby daughter. In 1781, during Stoner's long absence, Mason had married William Scarborough. Later that year Scarborough was killed by Captain James McDonald in a British raiding party led by Major John Ross, in what is known as the Battle of Johnstown. (Note: Stoner says that McDonald and Scarborough had been neighbors before the war, and the killing may have been the result of a personal quarrel.) In addition to Scarborough's daughter Mary (b.1782), Nicholas and Anna had six children together — four sons: John (b.1789), Jeremiah (b.1794), Henry (b.1796), and Obediah (b.1801), and two daughters: Mary, and Catherine (b.1802). The family first lived near Johnson Hall, and then moved to Scotch Bush, now in the town of Florida in Montgomery County. Stoner served for a time as deputy sheriff, and also filled various other offices in the town. During this time, too, he became noted as a hunter and trapper, primarily in the area along the Sacandaga River.

One time he engaged in a drunken brawl in De Fonclaire's Tavern in Johnstown, which was frequented by both Canadian and American trappers. One of the Canadian Indians, hearing the name of Stoner, pulled out his scalping knife and boasted of the nine notches indicating scalps taken during the Revolution. He pointed to one, cut deeper than the others, and said that this "was the scalp of old Stoner!" (Nicholas' father) Hearing this Stoner grabbed a red-hot andiron and threw it at the Indian, yelling "You never will scalp another one!" The iron burned a brand across the Indian's neck and knocked him unconscious, at the cost of severe burns to Stoner's own hand. It is not known what became of the injured Native, although he is believed to have died of his injury on the way back to Canada. Stoner was arrested and jailed, but was freed by a mob of fellow Revolutionary War veterans, and was never brought to trial.

Stoner was married to Anna Mason for over forty years. After her death in 1824 he lived for fifteen or twenty years with a woman named Polly Phye, whose husband had abandoned her. After Polly's death, Stoner married a much younger widow, Hannah (Houghtaling) Frank, in 1840, and resided in Caroga, New York.

== War of 1812 ==
At the outbreak of the War of 1812 both Stoner brothers enlisted—John in 1812 and Nicholas in 1813. John died of illness at Sackets Harbor, New York. Nicholas enlisted in the 29th Regiment. In the spring he joined the rest of the army at Plattsburgh as a fife-major, and henceforth was titled "Major Stoner". In September 1814, he took part in the Battle of Plattsburgh, where a small American force repelled a vastly superior British force.

== Death ==
Nicholas Stoner died at the age of 92 on November 24, 1853, in Newkirk's Mills (now Newkirk), in the town of Caroga. He was originally buried in Kingsborough Cemetery in Gloversville, which still has a plaque marking the site. His remains were later moved to Prospect Hill Cemetery in Gloversville.

== Legacy ==
The Nick Stoner Municipal Golf Course in Caroga is named for Stoner and also exhibits a large statue of him. East Stoner Lake, West Stoner Lake, and Little Stoner Lake at the northern end of Caroga, as well as Nick Stoner Island in nearby Canada Lake, bear his name. The fight song of Gloversville High School was "Old Nick Stoner, the Man whose Praise we sing." A liberty ship, SS Nick Stoner, was launched in 1944.
