= Fort Plain, New York =

- Village
- Location within New York Location within the United States
- Coordinates: 42°55′51″N 74°37′29″W
- Country: United States
- State: New York
- Region: Central New York
- County: Montgomery
- Town: Minden

Government
  - Mayor: Patrick L. Hanifin

Area
  - Total: 1.40 sq mi (3.63 km^{2})
  - Land: 1.34 sq mi (3.48 km^{2})
  - Water: 0.058 sq mi (0.15 km^{2})
- Elevation: 305 ft (93 m)

Population (2020)
  - Total: 1,930
  - Density: 1,435.4/sq mi (554.22/km^{2})
- Time zone: UTC-5 (Eastern (EST))
  - Summer (DST): UTC-4 (EDT)
- ZIP Code: 13339
- Area code: 518
- FIPS code: 36-26924
- GNIS feature ID: 0950490
- Website: www.villageoffortplain.org

Fort Plain is a village in Montgomery County, New York, United States. As of the 2020 census, the population was 1,930, down from 2,322 in 2010. The village is named after a fort built during the American Revolution at the junction of the Mohawk River and its tributary Otsquago Creek.

The village of Fort Plain is in the town of Minden and is west of Amsterdam.

== History ==
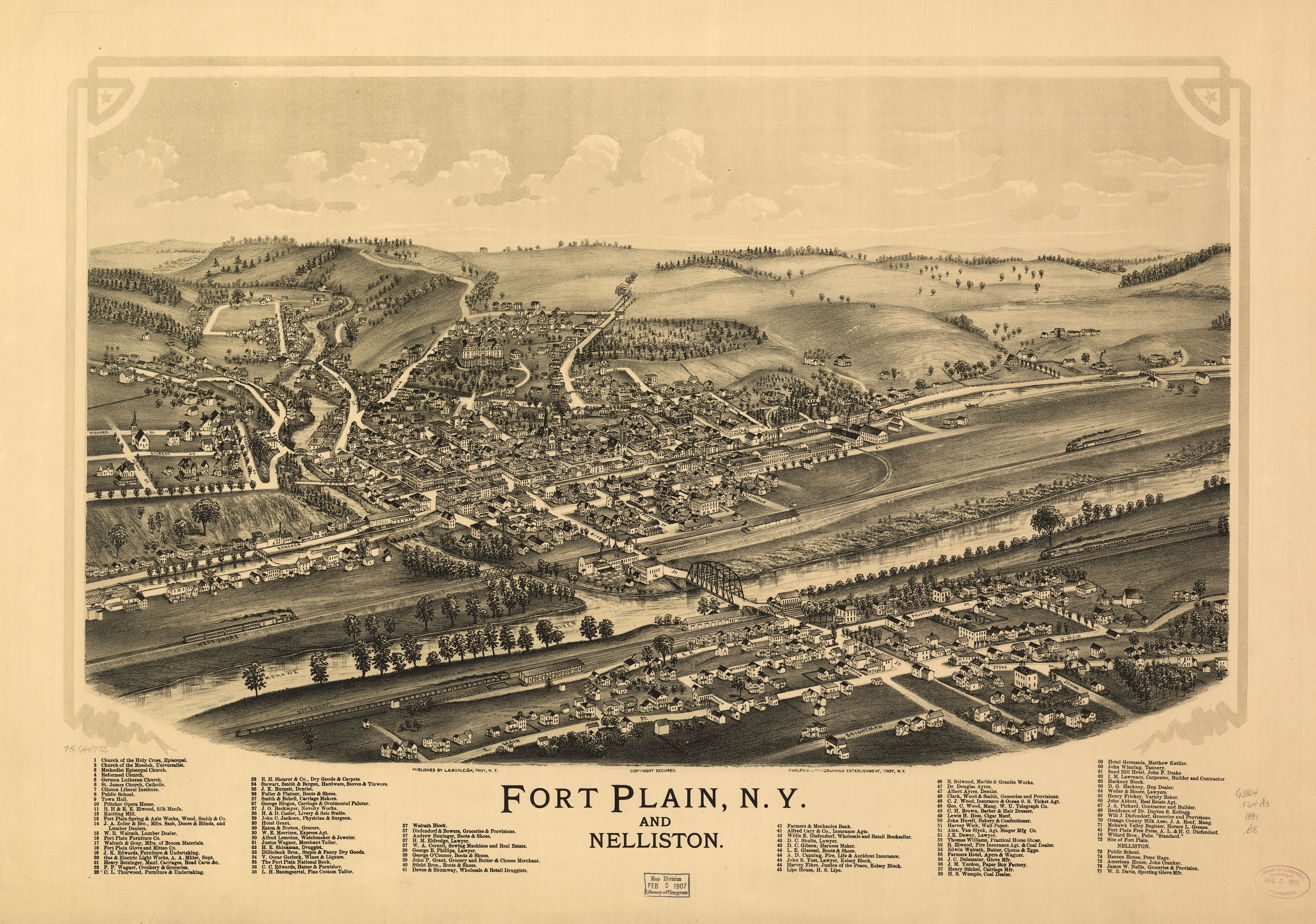
Perspective map of Fort Plain and Nelliston, New York, with list of landmarks published by L.R. Burleigh in 1891

The village is in a region where the Mohawk people had four major villages along the Mohawk River in the 17th century. They historically had occupied territory west of the Hudson River and extending north to the St. Lawrence River and south to the Delaware Water Gap, but their main villages were located close to the Mohawk River. Due to losses from a smallpox epidemic in 1634, the Mohawk reduced their villages to three. By the early 18th century they had two major villages.

The village of Fort Plain developed at the foot of the hill where the fort once stood. The Revolutionary War fort was constructed in 1776; a blockhouse was garrisoned here throughout the war. While many of the village's men were fighting elsewhere, the women, dressed as men, manned the fort and fought off Indian attacks. The village developed around Otsquago Creek at its confluence with the Mohawk River.

Fort Plain became an incorporated village in 1832. The opening of the Erie Canal was an economic boom, stimulating the village to become a center of manufacturing during the 19th century. It produced textiles from cotton from the Deep South and furniture. Textile mills in upstate New York depended on processing southern cotton; these products made up a major part of exports from New York City in the antebellum years.

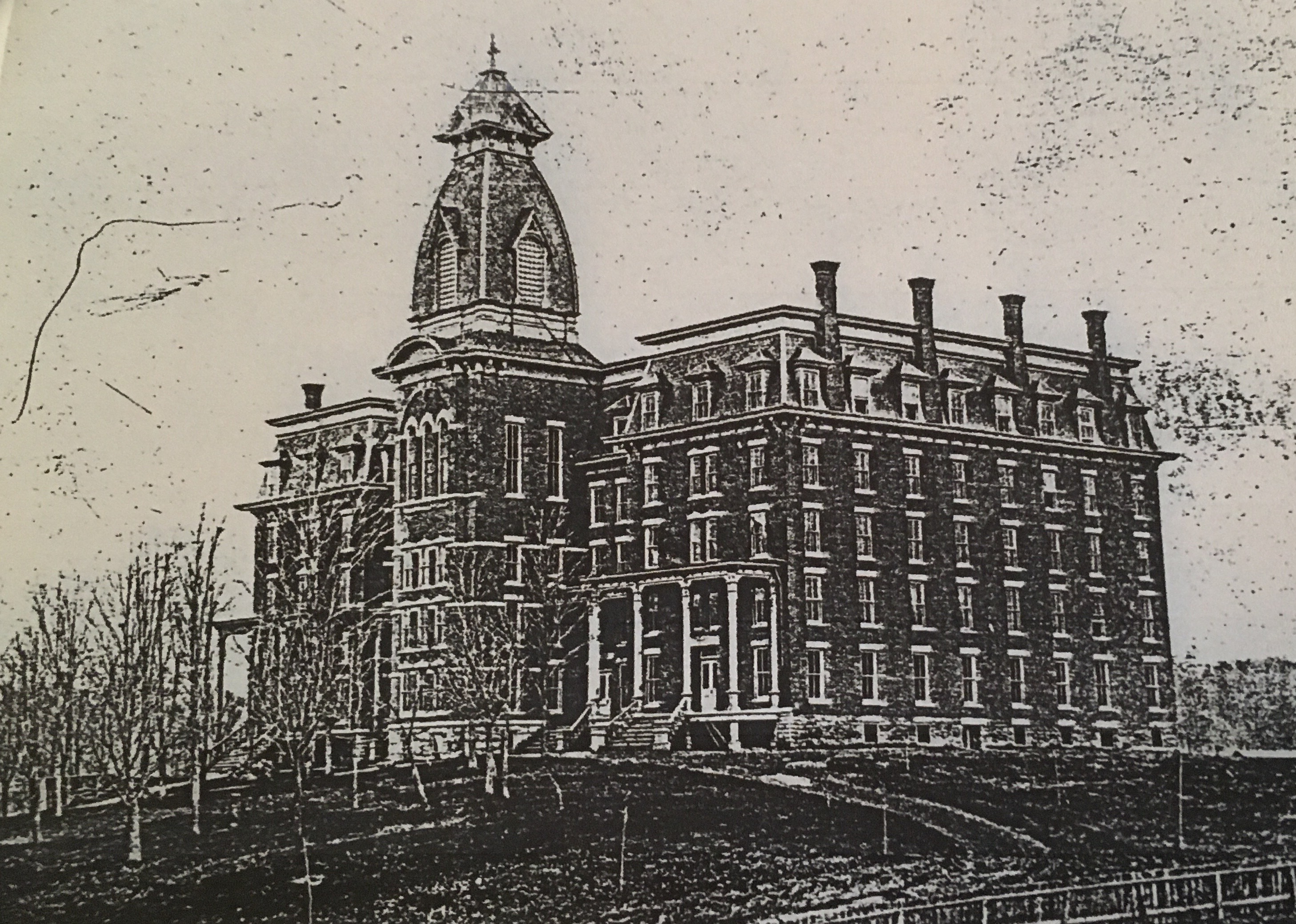
Clinton Liberal Institute

Fort Plain was the site of the 19th-century Fort Plain Seminary, which ran into hard times and whose building was acquired and used by the Clinton Liberal Institute, before being destroyed by fire in 1900.

Fort Plain is the birthplace of Bud Fowler, the first black professional baseball player. Fowler appeared in an exhibition game with a team from Lynn, Massachusetts, in 1878, 68 years before Jackie Robinson played in a professional baseball game in the major leagues.

Numerous Amish have migrated to New York from Pennsylvania since the late 20th century, seeking affordable farm land. Many have settled in Fort Plain. Montgomery County has one of the largest populations of Amish in the country.

The Fort Plain Conservation Area, Fort Plain Historic District, and United States Post Office are listed on the National Register of Historic Places.

On June 28, 2013, there was extensive flooding on Otsquago Creek, tearing up its streambed and damaging houses up the creek to Stark. More than 100 houses were damaged or destroyed in Fort Plain, where 4 inches (100 mm) of rain fell. Bridges over the creek were destroyed. Ten miles upstream, Stark received 7 inches (180 mm) of rain, which entered the creek and washed its bed away. The state quickly started the extensive work needed to repair the stream bed, nearby roadways and other infrastructure. Tons of rocks were laid down to stabilize the banks.

== Notable people ==
- Levi S. Backus, deaf newspaper editor
- Betty Buehler, actress
- Bud Fowler (1858–1913), first black professional baseball player
- Jeptha Root Simms (1807–1883), historian

== Geography ==
Fort Plain is located in western Montgomery County at 42°55′51″N 74°37′29″W. It occupies the eastern corner of the town of Minden and is bordered to the east, across the Mohawk River, by the village of Nelliston in the town of Palatine.

The New York State Thruway (Interstate 90) passes through the community, with the closest access 4 miles (6 km) to the east at Exit 29 in Canajoharie. The intersection of NY Route 80 (Reid Street), NY Route 5S (Canal Street), and NY Route 163 is in Fort Plain. NY 80 leads east across the Mohawk River into Nelliston and southwest 27 miles (43 km) to Cooperstown, while NY 5S leads southeast 3.5 miles (5.6 km) to Canajoharie and northwest 21 miles (34 km) to Mohawk. NY 163 has its western terminus at NY 80 in the village and leads southwest 7 miles (11 km) to Sprout Brook.

According to the U.S. Census Bureau, the village of Fort Plain has a total area of 1.40 square miles (3.6 km^{2}), of which 1.35 square miles (3.5 km^{2}) are land and 0.06 square miles (0.16 km^{2}), or 4.07%, are water. The village is located on the south bank of the Mohawk River, at the mouth of Otsquago Creek. The Erie Canal, using the Mohawk River, is adjacent to the village.

== Demographics ==
Historical population
Census	Pop.	Note	%±
1870	1,797		—
1880	2,443		35.9%
1890	2,864		17.2%
1900	2,444		−14.7%
1910	2,762		13.0%
1920	2,747		−0.5%
1930	2,725		−0.8%
1940	2,770		1.7%
1950	2,935		6.0%
1960	2,809		−4.3%
1970	2,809		0.0%
1980	2,555		−9.0%
1990	2,416		−5.4%
2000	2,288		−5.3%
2010	2,322		1.5%
2020	1,930		−16.9%
U.S. Decennial Census

As of the census of 2000, there were 2,288 people, 960 households, and 599 families residing in the village. The population density was 1,680.0 inhabitants per square mile (648.7/km^{2}). There were 1,108 housing units at an average density of 813.5 per square mile (314.1/km^{2}). The racial makeup of the village was 98.60% White, 0.09% African American, 0.09% Native American, 0.31% Asian, 0.48% from other races, and 0.44% from two or more races. Hispanic or Latino of any race were 1.44% of the population.

There were 960 households, out of which 30.5% had children under the age of 18 living with them, 44.6% were married couples living together, 11.9% had a female householder with no husband present, and 37.6% were non-families. 32.3% of all households were made up of individuals, and 19.5% had someone living alone who was 65 years of age or older. The average household size was 2.37 and the average family size was 2.97.

In the village, the population was spread out, with 25.8% under the age of 18, 8.1% from 18 to 24, 24.7% from 25 to 44, 22.1% from 45 to 64, and 19.3% who were 65 years of age or older. The median age was 38 years. For every 100 females, there were 90.7 males. For every 100 females age 18 and over, there were 84.6 males.

The median income for a household in the village was $27,476, and the median income for a family was $40,302. Males had a median income of $28,462 versus $21,557 for females. The per capita income for the village was $16,369. About 10.5% of families and 14.0% of the population were below the poverty line, including 19.0% of those under age 18 and 11.0% of those age 65 or over.
