= Justice Miles =

Justice Miles may refer to:

- George Miles (Michigan jurist) (1789–1850), associate justice of the Michigan Supreme Court
- Jeffrey Miles (1935–2019), chief justice of the Australian Capital Territory
- Willard W. Miles (1845–1926), associate justice of the Vermont Supreme Court
