= Gray-Jewett House =

Historic house in New York, United States

- U.S. National Register of Historic Places
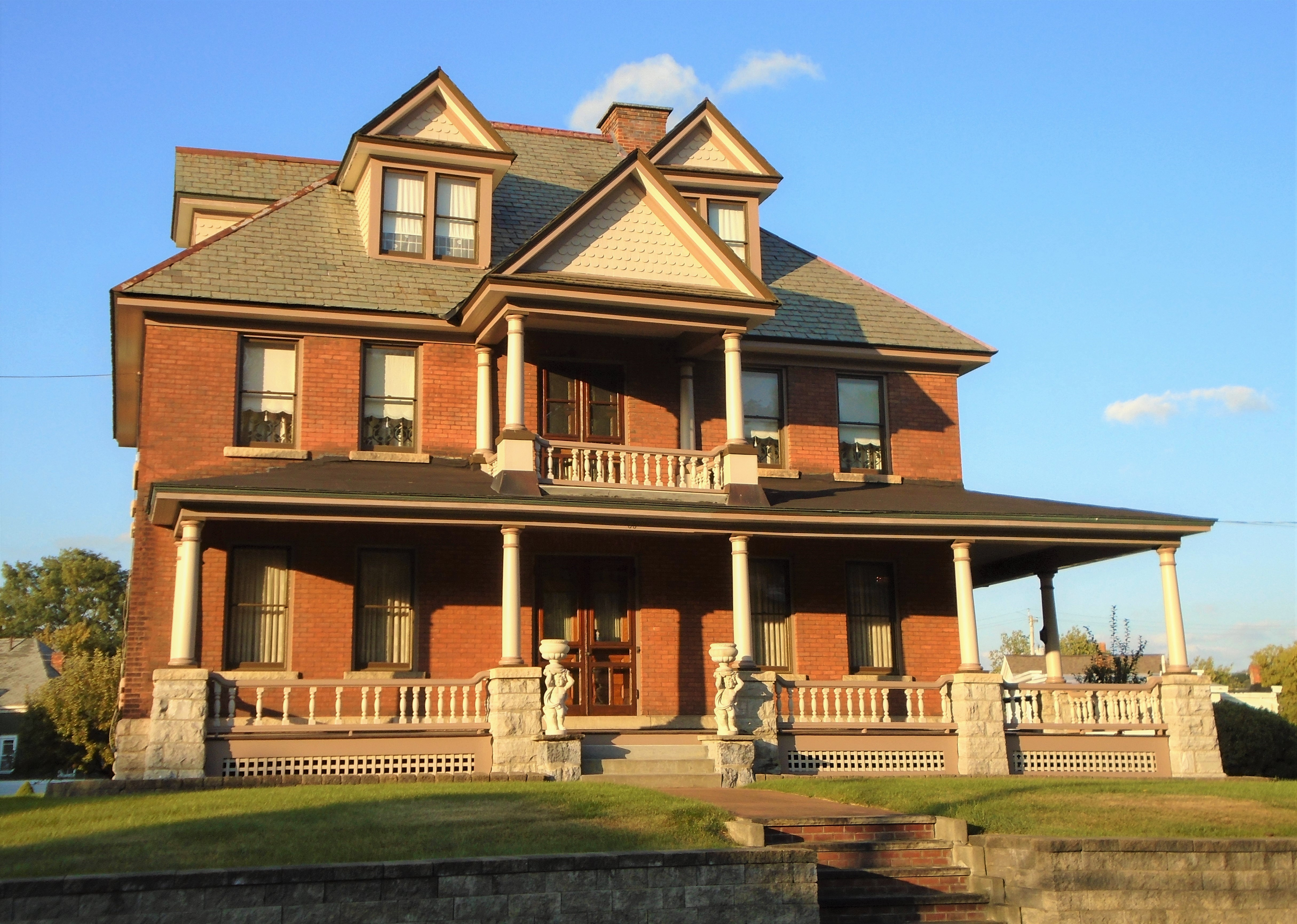
- (2020)

- Location within New York Location within the United States
- Location: 80 Florida Ave., Amsterdam, New York
- Coordinates: 42°56′1″N 74°12′0″W
- Built: 1890
- Architect: Henry C. Grieme
- Architectural style: Queen Anne, Colonial Revival
- NRHP reference No.: 05001127
- Added to NRHP: October 5, 2005

The Gray-Jewett House is a historic home located at 80 Florida Avenue in Amsterdam, Montgomery County, New York. It was built in 1890 and is a 2 1/2-story, brick, transitional Queen Anne / Colonial Revival–style residence on a limestone foundation. Also on the property is a carriage house / garage and ice house.

It was added to the National Register of Historic Places in 2005.
