= Amsterdam City Hall =

- U.S. National Register of Historic Places
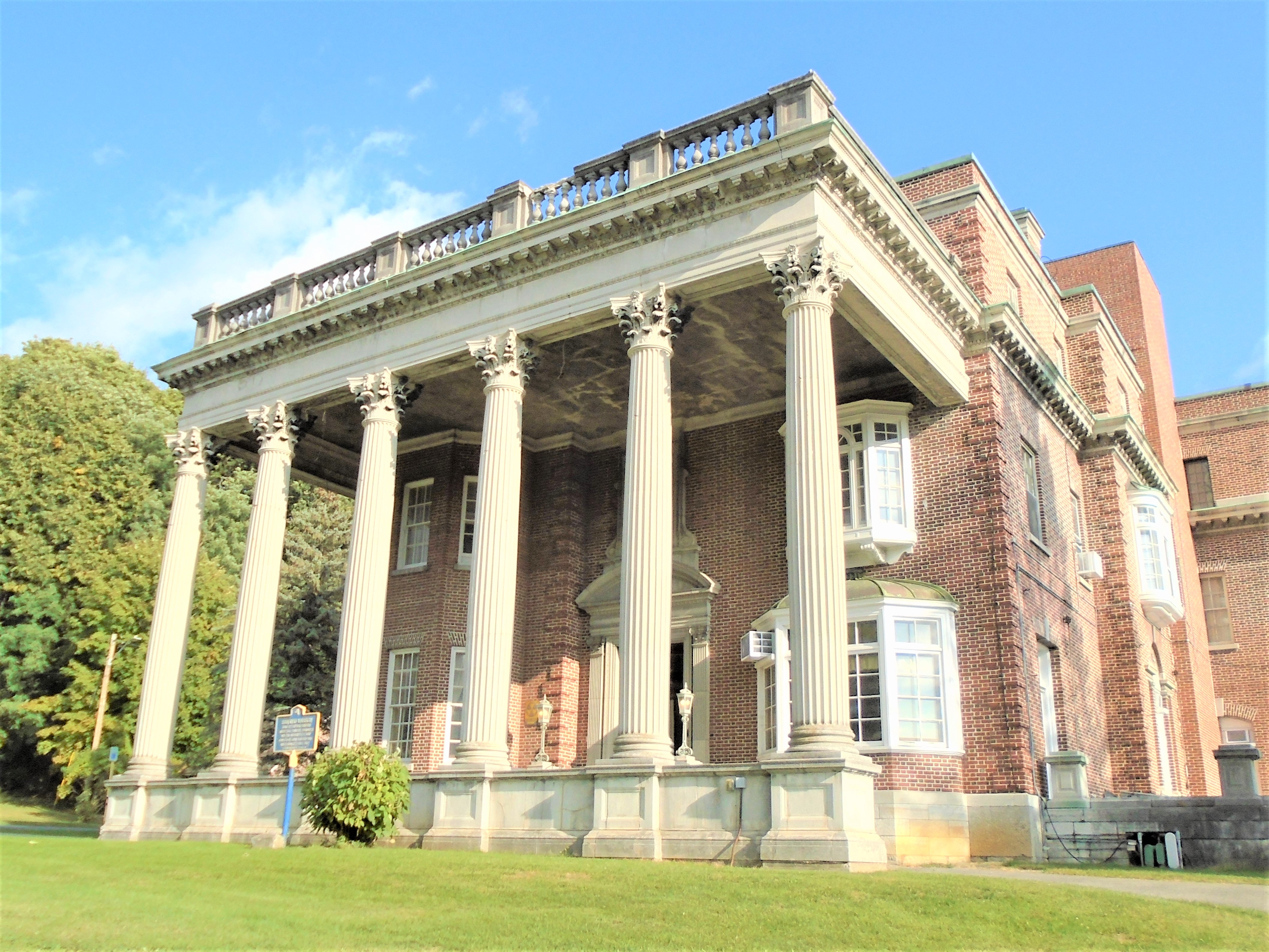
- (2020)

- Location within New York Location within the United States
- Interactive map showing the location of Amsterdam City Hall
- Location: 61 Church St. Amsterdam, New York
- Coordinates: 42°56′21″N 74°15′45″W
- Area: 6.1 acres (2.5 ha)
- Built: 1869
- Architect: Albert W. Fuller
- Architectural style: Classical Revival
- NRHP reference No.: 00001687
- Added to NRHP: February 5, 2001

Amsterdam City Hall is a historic city hall complex located in Amsterdam, Montgomery County, New York. The complex includes the former Sanford Mansion, laundry building, and carriage house. The Sanford Mansion was built in 1869 as the home of Stephen Sanford, an industrialist, rugmaker and philanthropist. The mansion was deeded to the city for use as a city hall upon the death of John Sanford in 1932. As the city hall, the original house was expanded considerably with a three-by-ten-bay addition, completed in the early 20th century.

The former Sanford Mansion is a 3-story, brick Classical Revival building designed by Albert W. Fuller which was extensively remodeled in 1913–1917. It features a massive portico with six fluted columns topped by Corinthian order capitals. The former laundry house is a simple 1 1/2-story brick building with a slate-covered gable roof. The former carriage house was built about 1869. Some landscape features dating to the 1917 remodeling remain on the property.

Amsterdam City Hall was added to the National Register of Historic Places in 2001.

== See also ==
- Stadt Huys Site
