= Amsterdam Castle =

- Amsterdam (46th Separate Company) Armory
- U.S. National Register of Historic Places
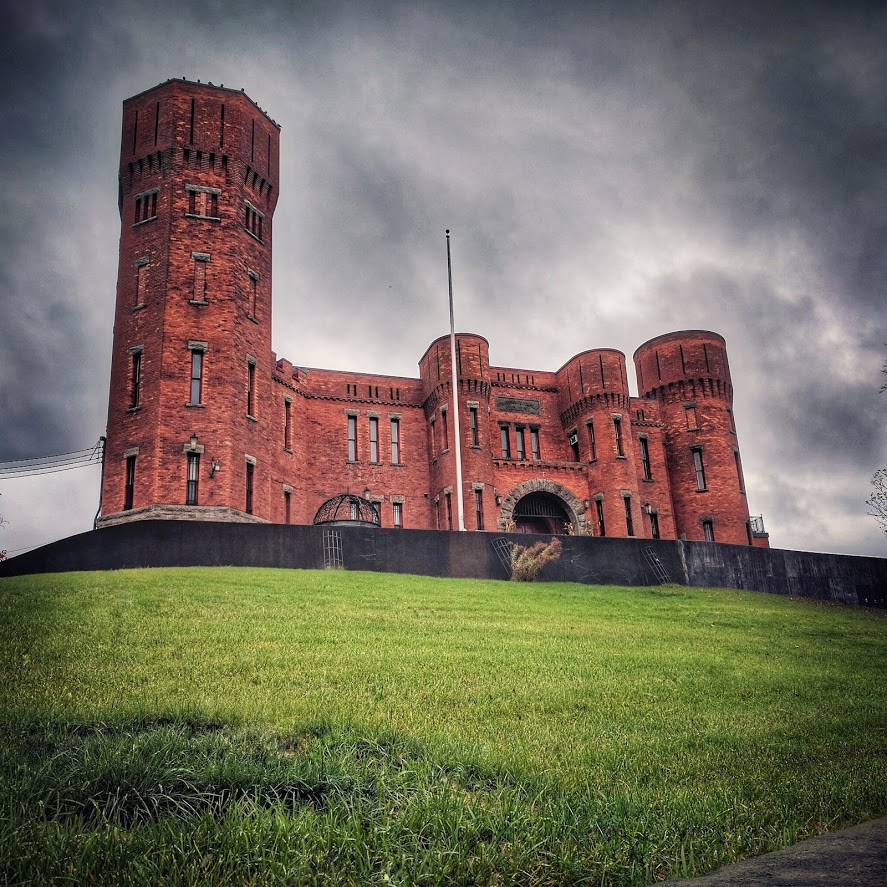
- Northside of Amsterdam Armory

- Location within New York Location within the United States
- Location: 49 Florida Ave. at Dewitt St., SW corner, Amsterdam, New York
- Coordinates: 42°55′58″N 74°11′59″W
- Area: 1 acre (0.40 ha)
- Built: 1895
- Architect: Isaac G. Perry
- Architectural style: Late Victorian, Castellated
- MPS: Army National Guard Armories in New York State MPS
- NRHP reference No.: 94000658
- Added to NRHP: July 1, 1994

Amsterdam Castle, also known as the Amsterdam Armory, located at 49 Florida Avenue at the intersection with Dewitt Street in Amsterdam, Montgomery County, New York was built in 1895 by Isaac G. Perry in the castellated Late Victorian style as a National Guard Armory for the 46th Separate Company of the New York Army National Guard. It was listed on the National Register of Historic Places in 1994.

The armory was decommissioned in 1994 and purchased by the Diana family from the State of New York in 1995. In 2005 the Phemister family purchased the building, and continued the extensive renovation, utilizing green building techniques in addition to creating a new residence wing, a billiard room and three new bathrooms. The property is currently in use as a private residence, hotel and event venue, and distribution facility. Of the 100 armories built in New York at the turn of the century, only several dozen are still in use as active armories, and Amsterdam Castle is the only armory converted into a private residence.

== Architecture ==
The building has a total of 36,000 sq ft (3,300 m^{2}) and had 50 rooms, including a 10,000 sq ft (930 m^{2}) gymnasium, a rifle range, a fallout shelter and a tank garage. Originally constructed with 18" brick walls, the Phemister family's extensive renovations rebuilt the interior with separate environmentally friendly building materials including low-volatile organic compound paint and repurposed wood. In 2012, the Preservation League of NY awarded the Susan & Manfred Phemister their Excellence in Historic Preservation Award.

The castle is currently a 21-room hotel with restaurant and bar. It also continues to be used as a private residence.

== Gallery ==
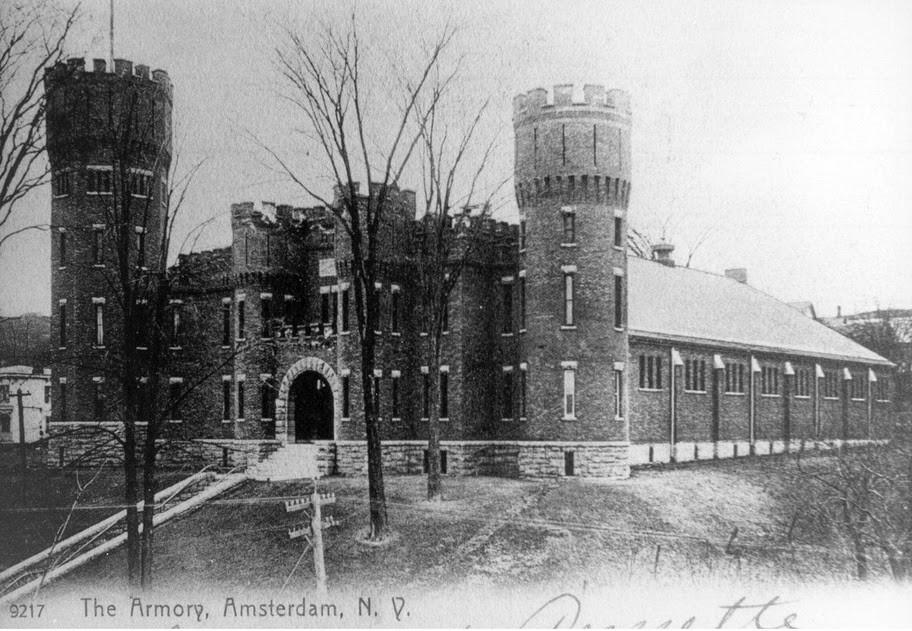
19th century picture of the Amsterdam Armory

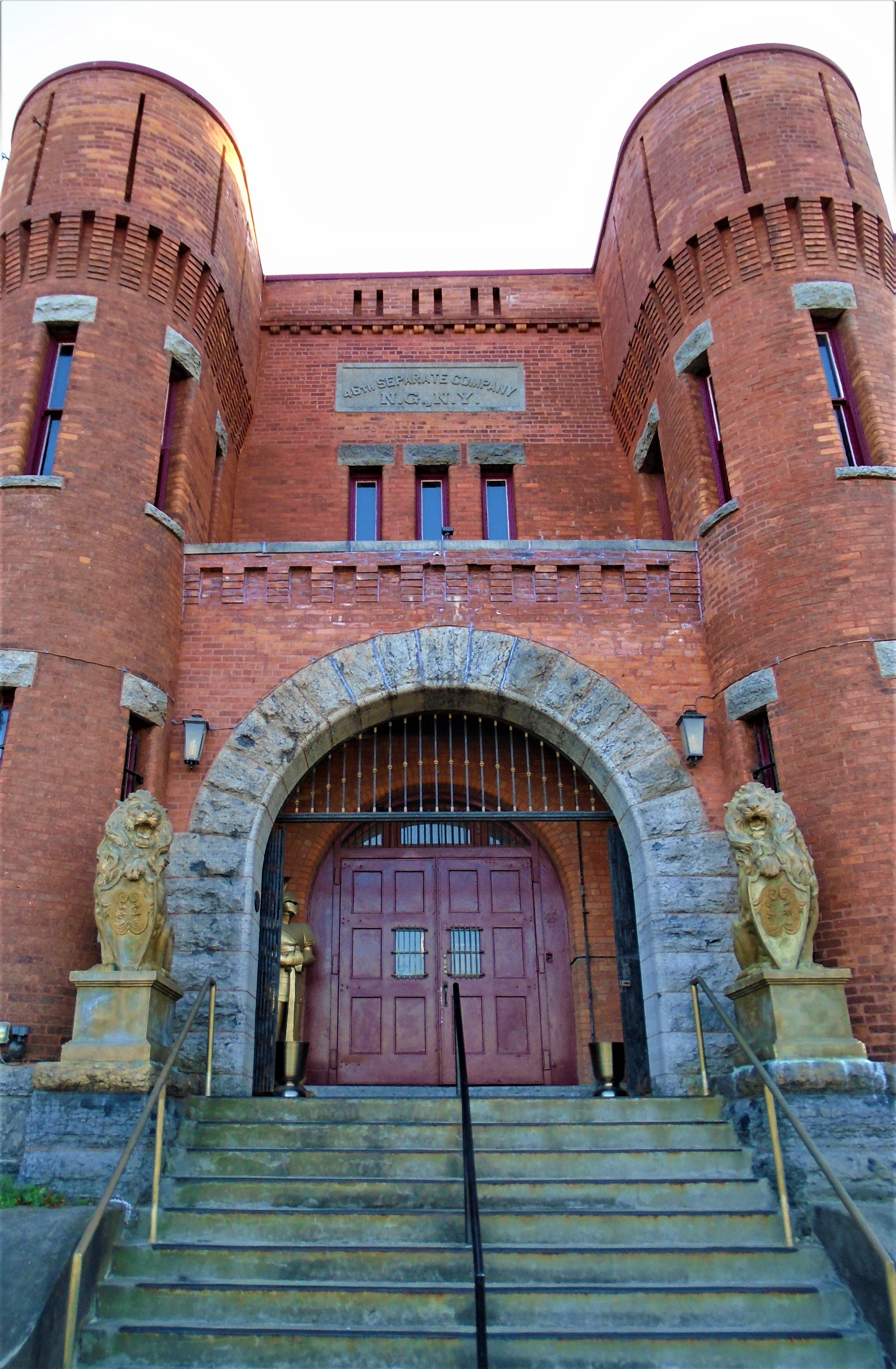
Entrance

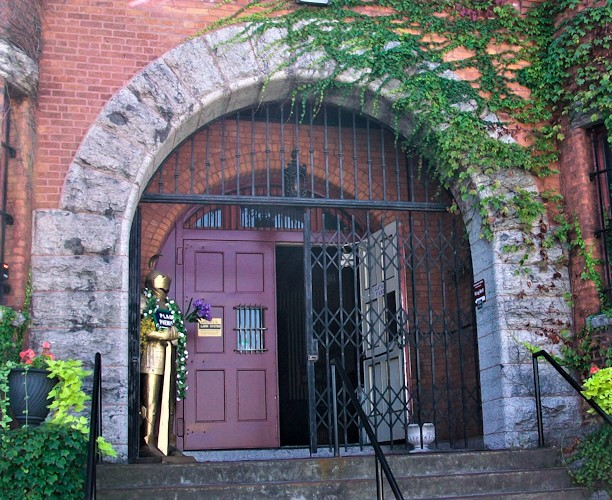
Entrance gate

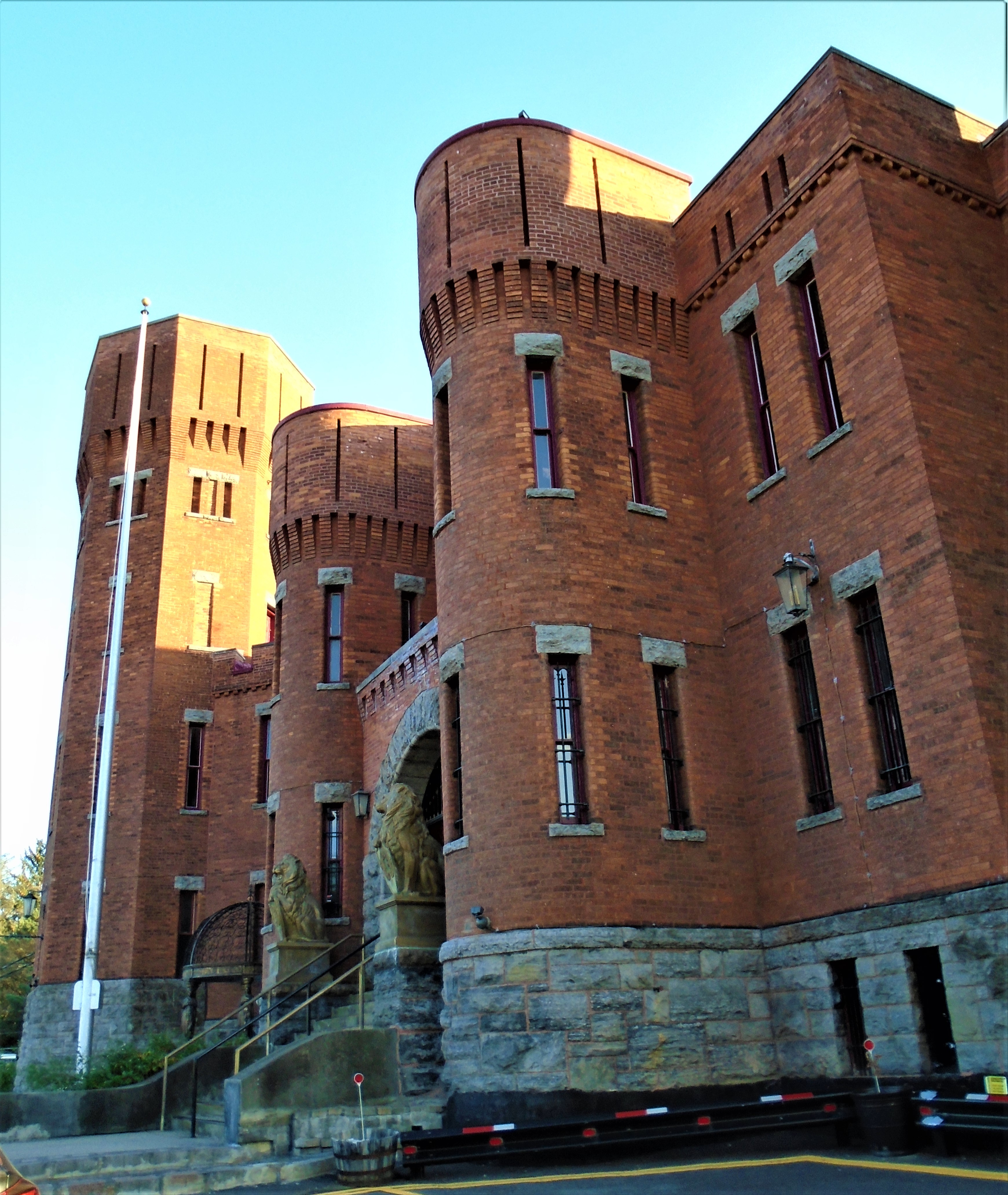
View from the west
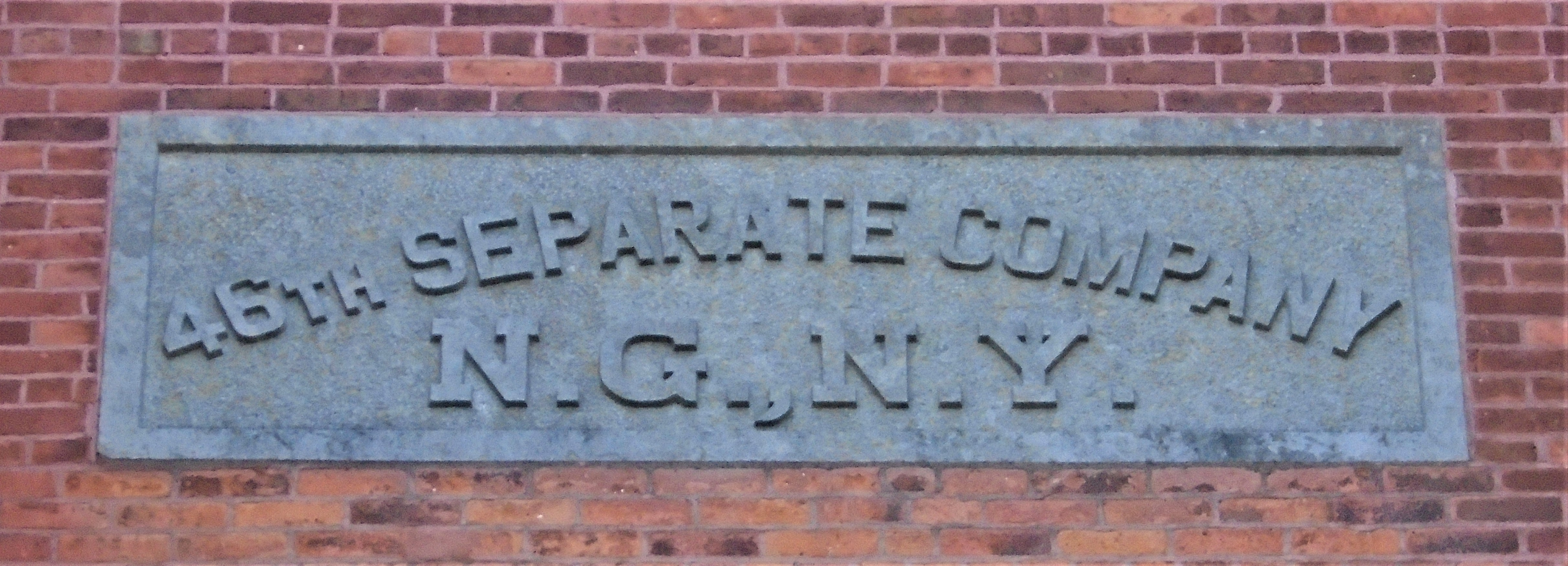
