= Samuel Sweet Canal Store =

Historic commercial building in New York, United States

- U.S. National Register of Historic Places
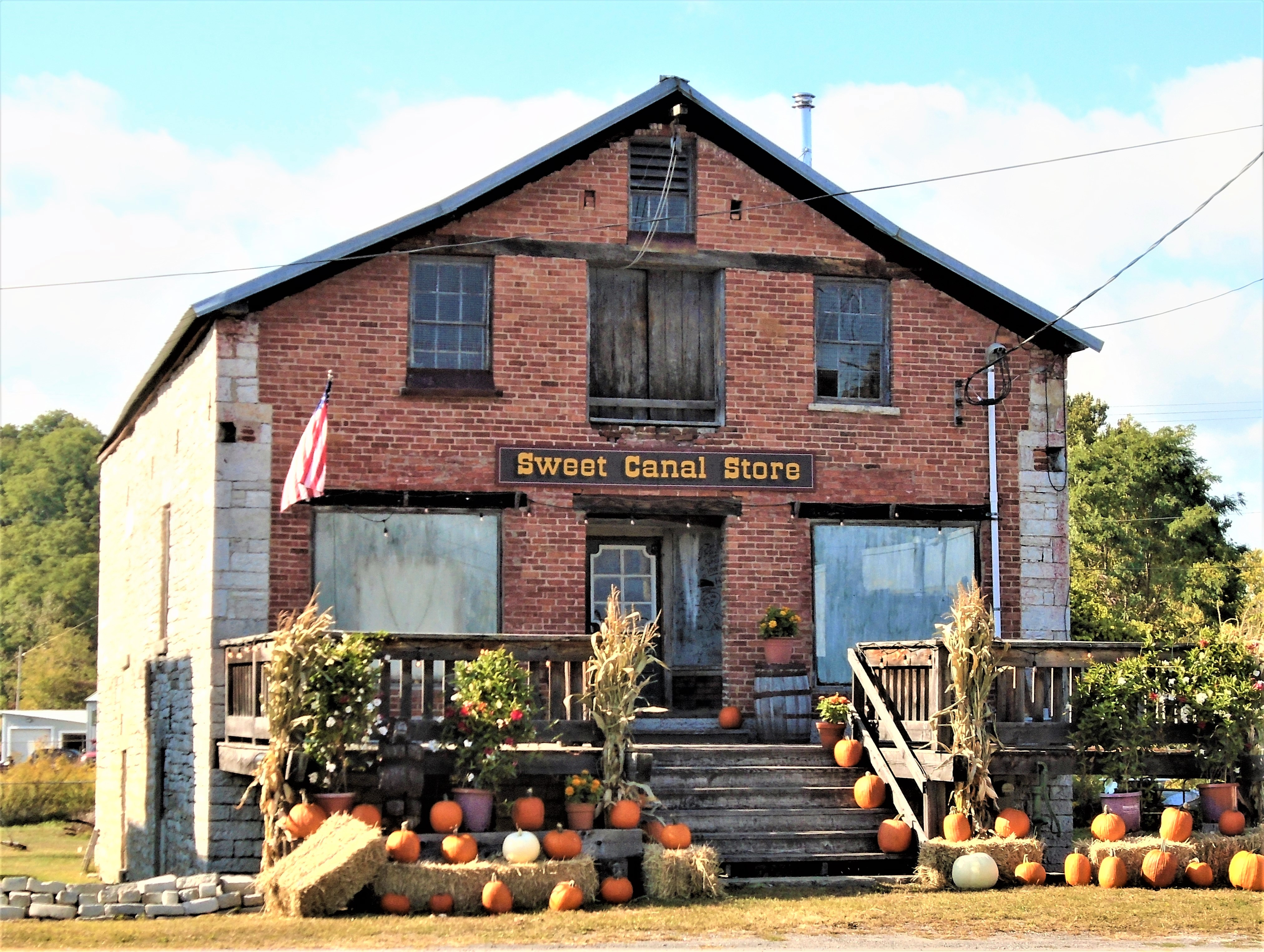
- (2020)

- Location within New York Location within the United States
- Location: 65 Bridge St., Amsterdam, New York
- Coordinates: 42°56′4″N 74°11′54″W
- Built: c.1847
- NRHP reference No.: 89001389
- Added to NRHP: September 19, 1989

Samuel Sweet Canal Store is a historic commercial building located at 65 Bridge Street in Amsterdam, Montgomery County, New York. It was built c.1847 to service barges on the Erie Canal, as both a store and a forwarding warehouse for goods shipped across the Mohawk River.

It is a three-story, rectangular building measuring approximately 30 feet by 70 feet built of rough cut, pale grey limestone and has a shallow pitched gable roof.

It was added to the National Register of Historic Places in 1989.
