= Temple of Israel (Amsterdam, New York) =

Reform synagogue in Amsterdam, New York, US

- Spanish: Templo Esperanza de Israel
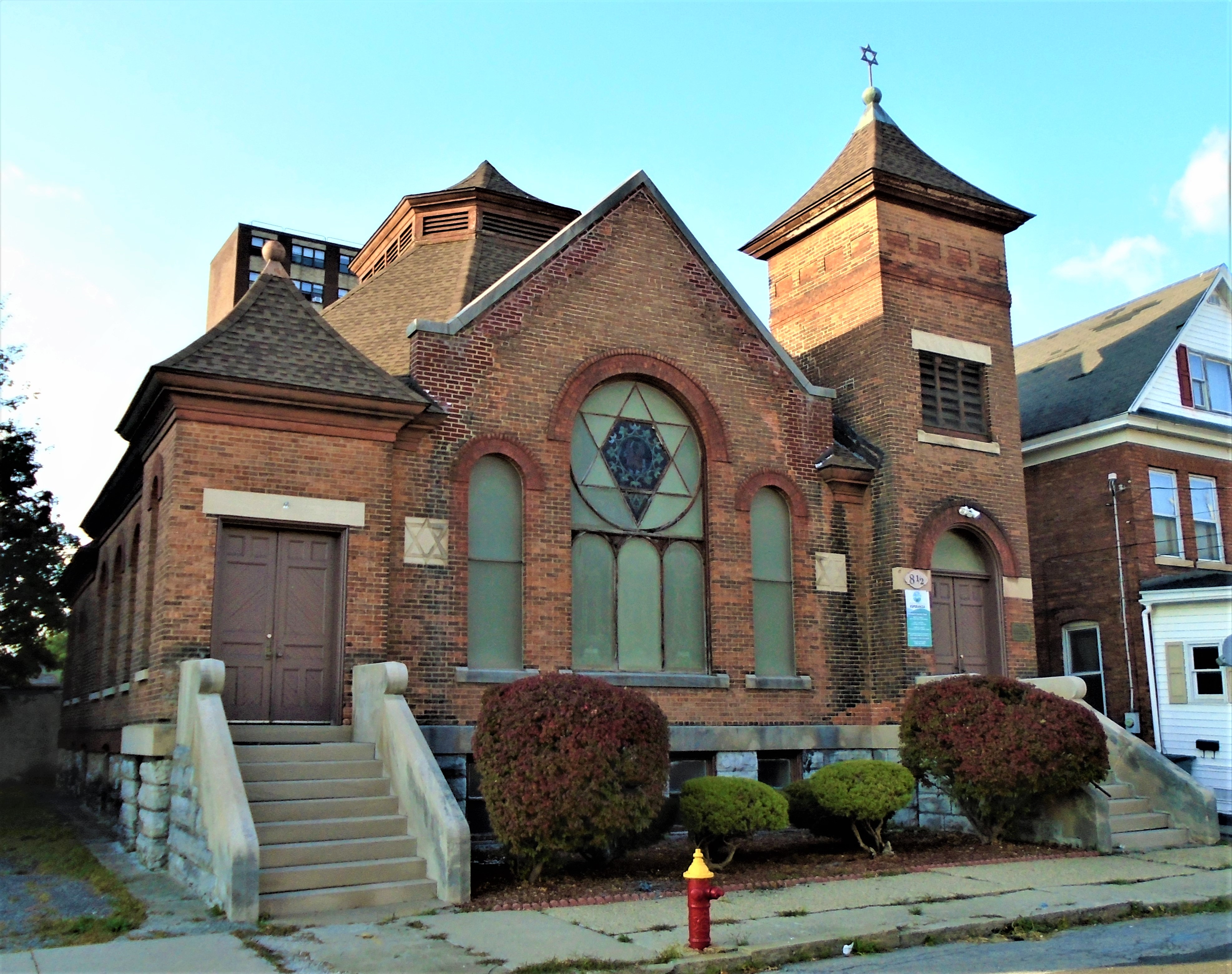
- The former synagogue, now church, in 2020

- Location in New York

Religion
- Affiliation: Reform Judaism (former); Evangelical Christianity
- Ecclesiastical or organizational status: Synagogue (1901–2005); Church (since 2008)
- Status: Active

Location
- Location: 81/2 Mohawk Place, Amsterdam, Montgomery County, New York
- Country: United States
- Interactive map of Temple of Israel
- Coordinates: 42°56′22″N 74°11′41″W

Architecture
- Architect: Worthy Niver
- Type: Synagogue
- Style: Late 19th and 20th Century Revivals; Late Victorian
- Established: 1874 (Jewish congregation)
- Completed: 1901 (synagogue); 2008 (church)
- Capacity: 200 worshippers
- Temple of Israel
- U.S. National Register of Historic Places
- NRHP reference No.: 92001043
- Added to NRHP: August 27, 1992

The Temple of Israel is an historic former Reform Jewish congregation and synagogue located at 81/2 Mohawk Place in Amsterdam, Montgomery County, New York, in the United States. Rededicated as Templo Esperanza de Israel, the building has been used as a church since 2008.

== History ==
The Jewish congregation was incorporated in 1874 and the synagogue building was completed in 1901. The synagogue was designed by Worthy Niver in the Late Victorian and late 19th- and 20th-century revival styles.

The former synagogue is a 1 1/2-story, rectangular, eclectic brick building which has an octagonal roof and is topped by an octagonal louvered cupola. It features two turreted towers of unequal height with pyramidal roofs and a rose window with Star of David over three round arch windows.

It was added to the National Register of Historic Places in 1992.

Purchased in 2008 by Ministerio Esperanza, or Hope Ministry, an Evangelical church that is associated with the Assemblies of God, the building was rededicated as Templo Esperanza de Israel, which means The Temple Hope of Israel.
