= Saint Stanislaus Roman Catholic Church Complex =

Historic church in New York, United States

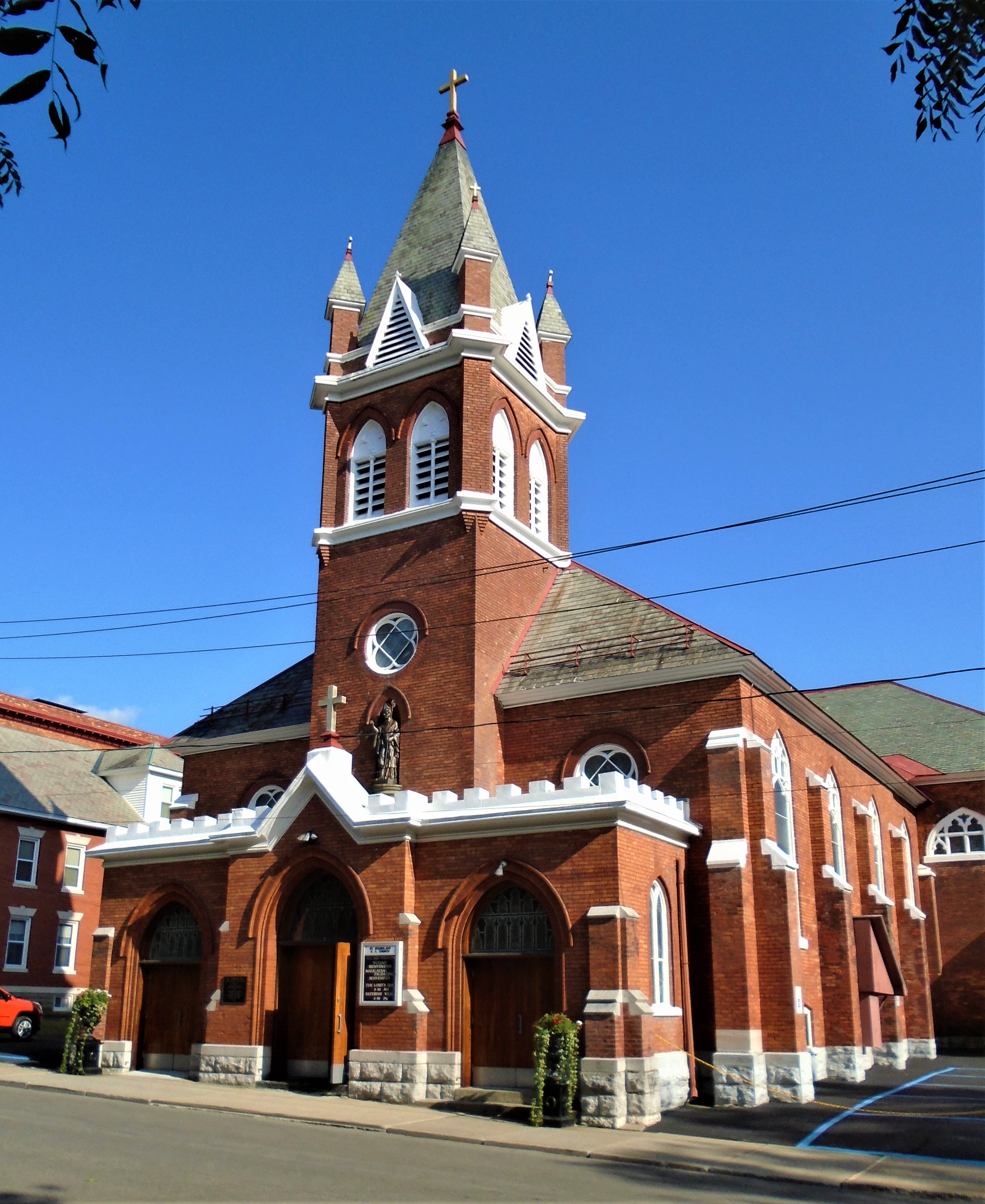
- (2020)

Religion
- Affiliation: Roman Catholic
- Diocese: Diocese of Albany
- Ecclesiastical or organizational status: Church
- Leadership: Pastor: Fr. O. Robert DeMartinis

Location
- Location: 50-52 Cornell Street (church); 46 Cornell Street (convent, now parish center); 42-44 Cornell Street (school); 73 Reid Street (rectory); Amsterdam
- State: New York
- Interactive map of Saint Stanislaus Roman Catholic Church Complex
- Coordinates: 42°56′39″N 74°10′58″W

Architecture
- Architects: Edward W. Loth (church); C. B Machold (school)
- Style: Late Gothic Revival (church); Georgian (rectory)
- Completed: 1897 (church), 1906 (school),

Specifications
- Direction of façade: Northwest
- Materials: Brick

U.S. National Register of Historic Places
- Added to NRHP: April 29, 1999
- NRHP Reference no.: 99000505

Saint Stanislaus Roman Catholic Church Complex is a historic Roman Catholic church complex at 42, 46, 50 Cornell Street, and 73 Reid Street in Amsterdam, Montgomery County, New York. The complex consists of four contributing buildings:

- St. Stanislaus Church – 50-52 Cornell St., established 1894, built 1897, designed by Edward W. Loth, enlarged 1912;
- St. Stanislaus School – 42-44 Cornell St., founded 1897, built 1905–1906, designed by C. B. Machold, closed 2011;
- Felician Sisters convent – 46 Cornell Street, built 1934, now the Saint John Paul II Parish Center; and
- rectory – 73 Reid Street, built 1940–41, Georgian style.

The church is a T-shaped brick building on a foundation of cut limestone. A transept was added in 1912. It features an engaged bell tower with pyramidal roof and finials.

The complex was added to the National Register of Historic Places in 1999.

== Gallery ==
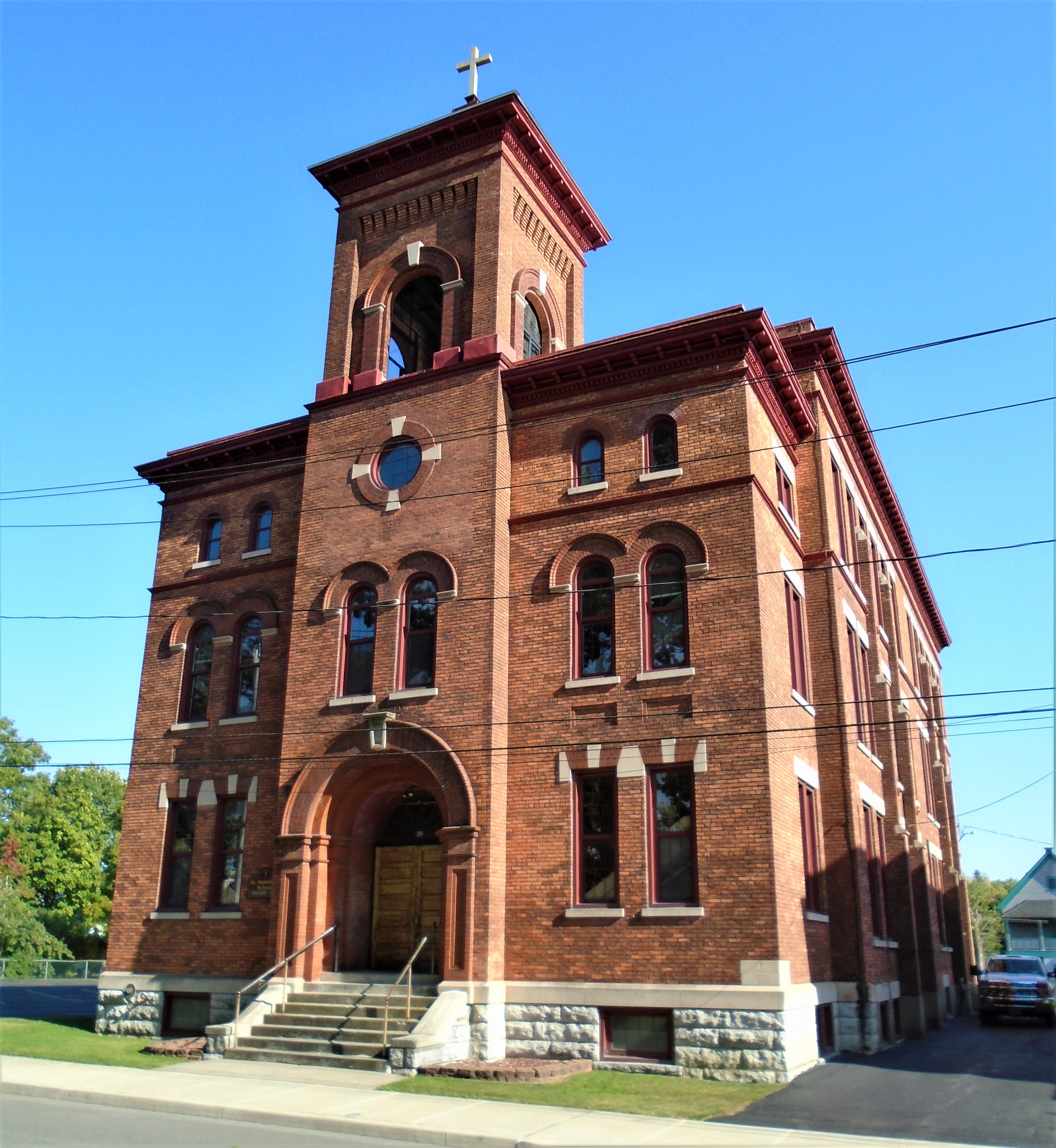
The St. Stanislaus School closed c.2011

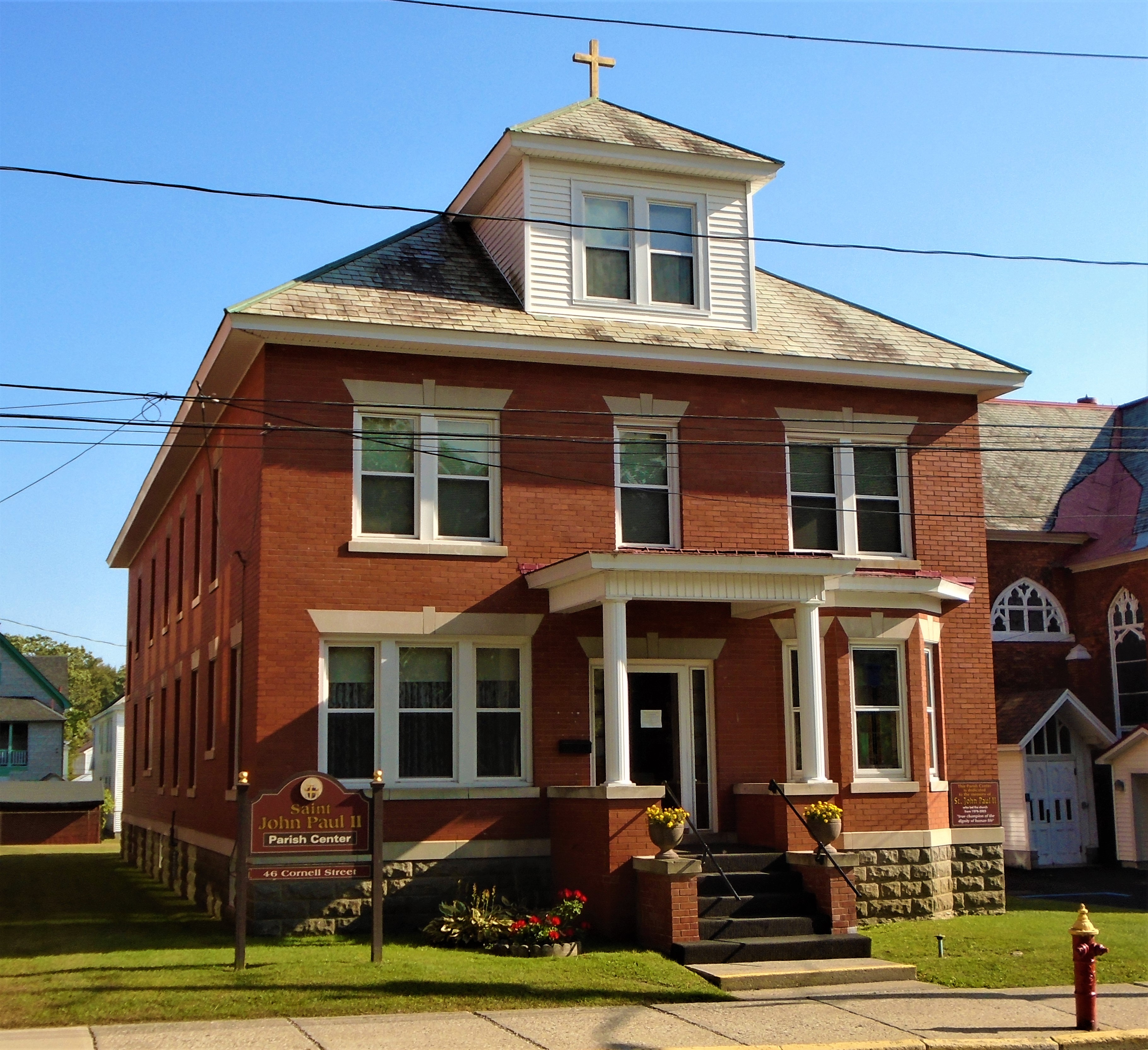
The former convent used by the Felician Sisters, who taught at the school, now the Saint John Paul II Parish Center

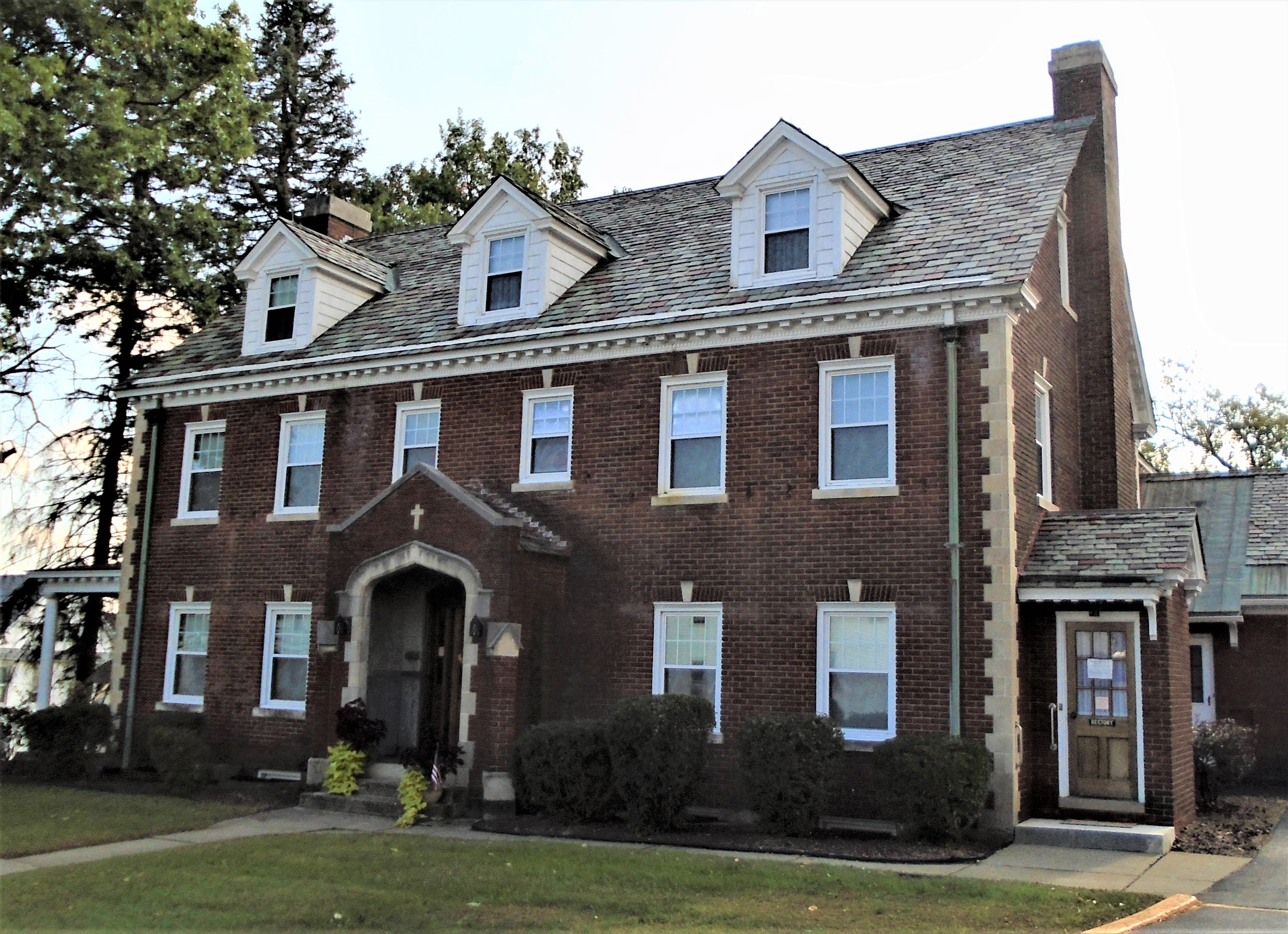
The rectory
