= United States Post Office (Amsterdam, New York) =

- US Post Office-Amsterdam
- U.S. National Register of Historic Places
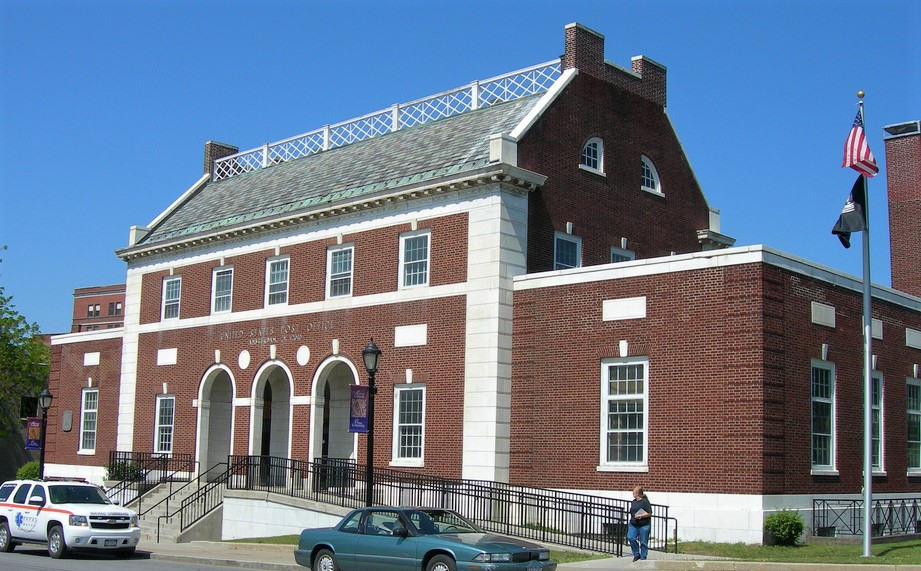
- (2008)

- Location within New York Location within the United States
- Interactive map showing the location for U.S. Post Office-Amsterdam
- Location: 12-16 Church St., Amsterdam, New York
- Coordinates: 42°56′14″N 74°11′31″W
- Built: 1935
- Architect: Louis A. Simon
- Architectural style: Colonial Revival
- MPS: US Post Offices in New York State, 1858–1943, TR
- NRHP reference No.: 88002451
- Added to NRHP: November 17, 1988

The US Post Office-Amsterdam is a historic post office building located at 12-16 Church Street in Amsterdam, Montgomery County, New York. It was built in 1935–1936, and was designed by Louis A. Simon, the Supervising Architect of the Treasury Department in the Colonial Revival style. It consists of a 2 1/2-story, symmetrically massed brick building with 1-story side wings and a large rear wing in the Colonial Revival style. The interior features a pair of 1939 murals by Henry Schnakenberg (1892–1970).

It was listed on the National Register of Historic Places in 1988.
