= Vrooman Avenue School =

- U.S. National Register of Historic Places
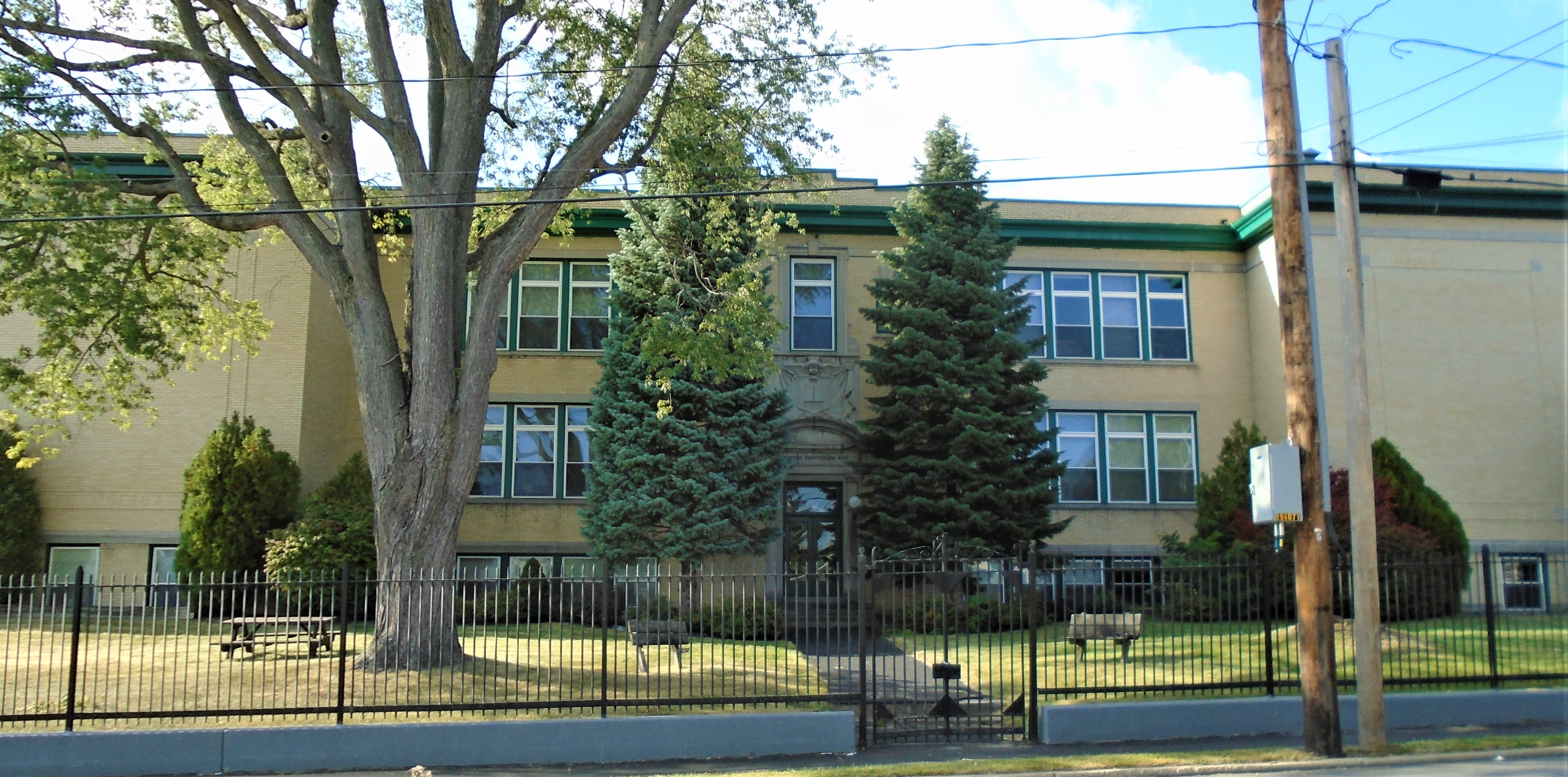
- (2020)

- Location within New York Location within the United States
- Location: 400 Vrooman Ave., Amsterdam, New York
- Coordinates: 42°56′8″N 74°10′30″W
- Area: 2 acres (0.81 ha)
- Built: 1918
- Architectural style: Colonial Revival; Georgian Revival
- NRHP reference No.: 83001712
- Added to NRHP: June 30, 1983

The Vrooman Avenue School is a historic school building located at 400 Vrooman Avenue in Amsterdam, Montgomery County, New York. It was built in 1918 and is a two-story, H-shaped, yellow brick institutional building. It features a slight projecting central pavilion at the main entrance and an elaborate stone carving depicting a child's head and a swag draped around an open book. A gymnasium was added to the main structure in 1925. The school closed in June 1975, and is now an apartment building.

It was added to the National Register of Historic Places in 1983.
