= Mohawk Valley Gateway Overlook =

Pedestrian bridge in Amsterdam, New York

Coordinates: 42.9356°N 74.1947°W

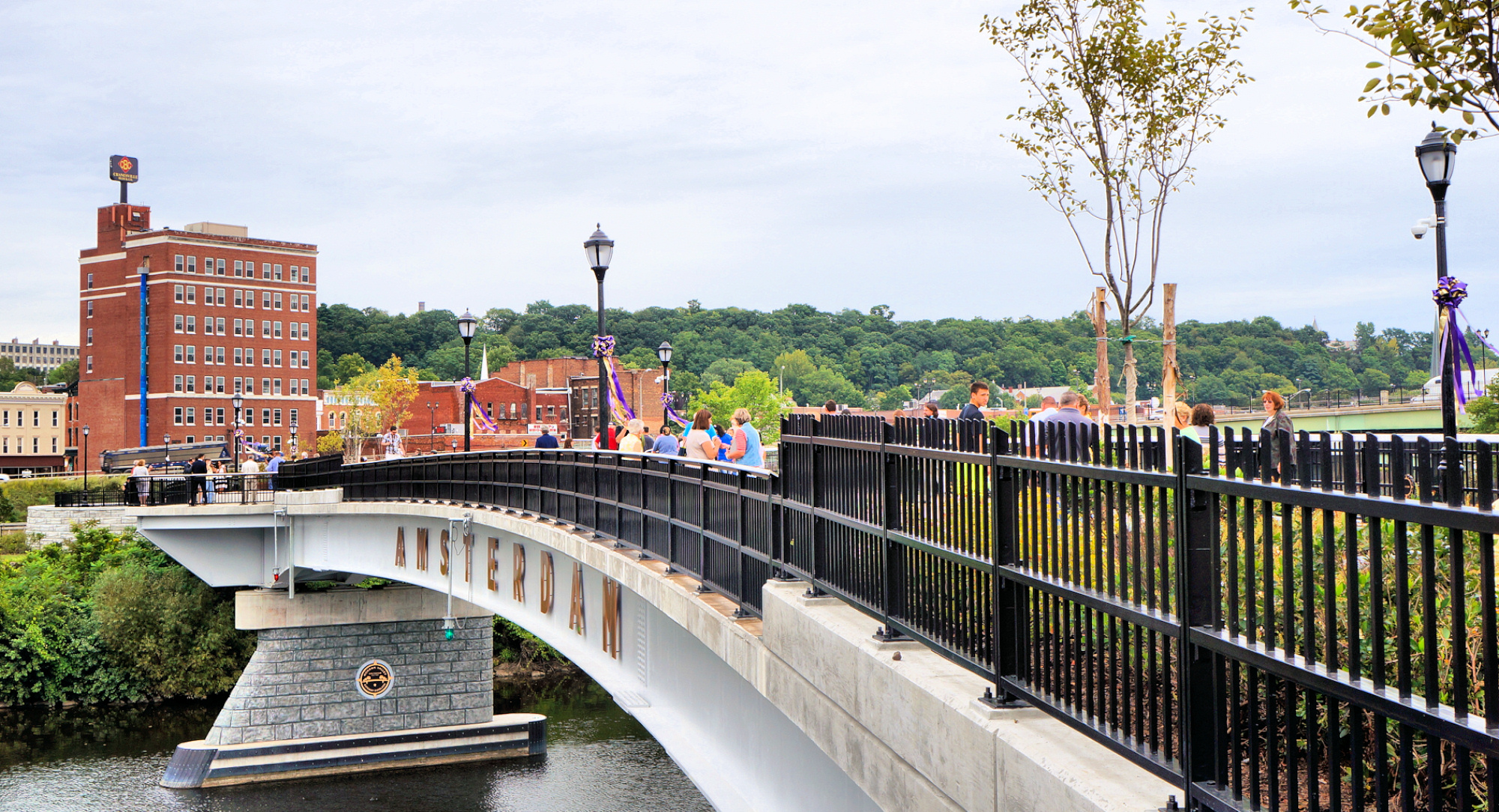
The Overlook

The Mohawk Valley Gateway Overlook is a public pedestrian bridge in the City of Amsterdam, New York, connecting Riverlink Park on the north shore of the Mohawk River to Bridge Street on the south shore. The bridge is 30 feet (9.1 m) wide and spans 511 feet (156 m) over the river.

Construction on the bridge began in June 2014 and it was opened to the public in August 2016. It features numerous trees and flower plantings, as well as local historical and cultural information engraved into the decking and on plaques along the railings. It is the first bridge spanning over water to include live trees planted on its surface.

The primary source of funding for the project was $16.5 million allocated in the Rebuild and Renew New York Transportation Bond Act of 2005. An additional $1.65 million for artistic elements and other amenities was provided by grants from New York State.

The opening of the bridge was marked by a ribbon-cutting ceremony on August 31, 2016. New York Lieutenant Governor Kathy Hochul, Congressman Paul Tonko, State Assemblyman Angelo Santabarbara, Montgomery County Executive Matthew Ossenfort, Amsterdam Mayor Michael Villa, and New York State Canal Corporation directors William Finch and Brian Stratton, were speakers at the ceremony.

The bridge, which won the 2016 Engineering Project of the Year from the Capital District Chapter of the New York State Society of Professional Engineers, a 2016 Merit Award from the American Society of Landscape Architects, a Great Places in Upstate NY: Public Spaces Award from The American Planning Association and recognized in September 2019 as one of 13 "Great Places" awarded by the American Planning Federation (APA). is maintained by the City of Amsterdam and the New York State Canal Corporation.

== Initial concept ==
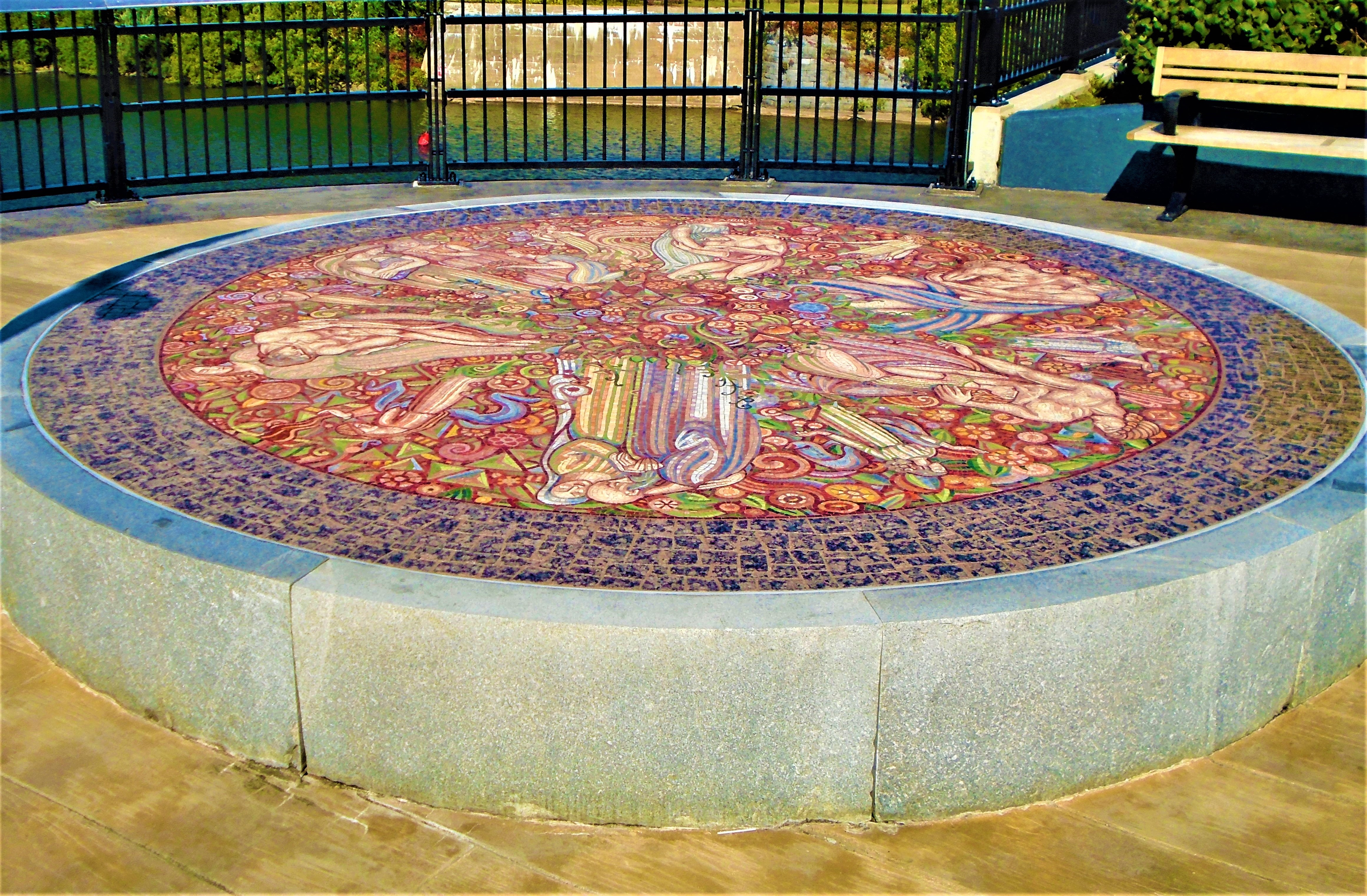
The "Wheel of Life" display

The idea to build a pedestrian bridge to connect the north and south sides of the city was proposed in an updated version of the city's comprehensive plan which was released in 2003. Paul Tonko, who was a New York State assemblyman, fought for the inclusion of $16.5 million for the project in the Rebuild and Renew New York Transportation Bond Act of 2005. The act authorized a total of $2.9 billion in borrowing for statewide transportation-related projects and was approved by referendum in November 2005.

Three different designs for the bridge were developed by Saratoga Associates of Saratoga Springs, New York, and presented during several informational meetings in 2009 and 2010. The final curved "park over the river" design was selected with input from the public.

Original plans for the bridge included artistic elements such as engraved concrete decking, historical and cultural plaques along the railing, lettering for the city's name on the exterior of the bridge, two circular pieces of artwork at either end of the bridge: a reproduction of the Wheel of Life mosaic, and a compass design, and two large sculptures, one at each entrance to the bridge. These elements were removed from the project due to construction cost increases. Two grants from New York State later funded the additional elements. All the additional elements except for the two large sculptures and the reproduction of the Wheel of Life mosaic were completed in time of the bridge's opening in 2016.

Ann Thane, former mayor, and Rob von Hasseln, city historian and former community and economic development director, were credited for their involvement with the artistic cultural and historical elements on the bridge.

== Projected economic impact ==
In 2015, von Hasseln presented an economic case for the bridge to city residents. Citing statistics from Erie Canal Way National Historic Corridor studies, he proposed that if the bridge drew 30,000 visitors per year, the potential economic impact for local businesses could total $10,210,460 per year, which would generate an additional $408,418 in Montgomery County sales tax, and $64,121 for the city. The visitor estimate was based on the actual number of guest book signers per year at the Bridge of Flowers in Shelburne Falls, Massachusetts. Von Hasseln said that given Shelburne's lower regional population, greater distance from a major highway, and lack of any other major attractions in comparison to the Amsterdam location, that he saw no reason why the MVGO shouldn’t at least be able to draw the same numbers.

== Local opposition ==
In 2007, both the Amsterdam Industrial Development Agency and the Amsterdam Common Council passed resolutions calling on state lawmakers and the Canal Corporation to redirect the funds for the bridge to infrastructure improvement projects, demolition, establishing a railroad quiet zone and other economic development projects. Joe Emanuele, who was mayor at the time and is a current member of AIDA, said in regards to the grant money, “We’re just asking the legislature to reconsider… we’re not refusing it, but asking if we can redirect funds to more needy projects.”

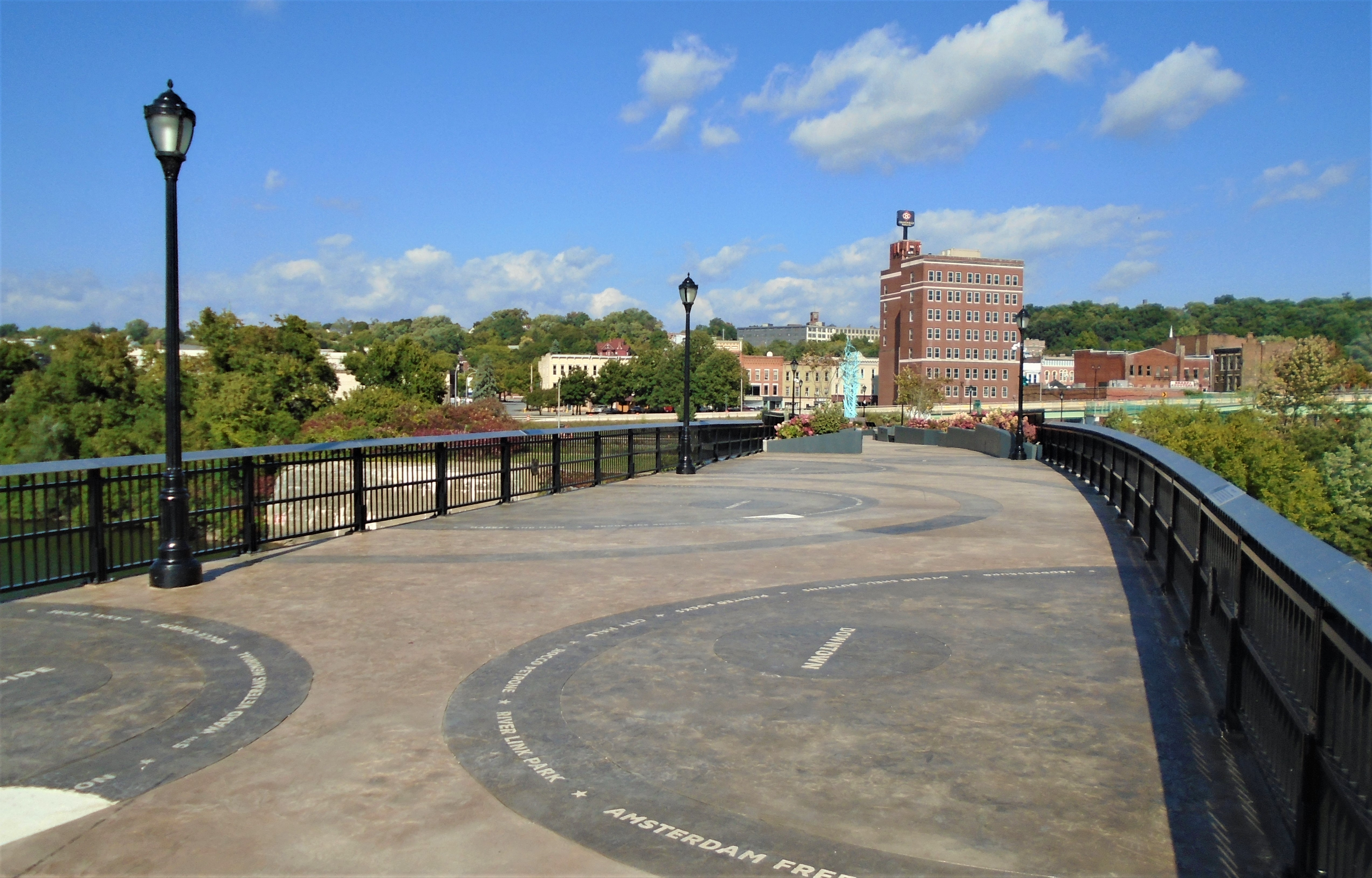
The walkway looking north

George Amedore, a New York State assemblyman at the time, said, “A pedestrian bridge will not bring economic growth to Amsterdam.”

In 2009, a petition was circulated among city residents which called for the funds to be redirected to projects such as a walkway between Guy Park Manor and Riverlink Park, or adding pedestrian access to the existing Lock 11 bridge.

Ann Thane, who was mayor at the time, advocated for the continuation of the project and said "I think that the city has a tremendous gift here and this is going to be a wonderful economic development driver." Carmella Mantello, who was director of the Canal Corporation at the time, said a redistribution of the funds wasn’t possible.

== Project contractors ==
Saratoga Associates provided the architectural and landscape design for the bridge. Ammann & Whitney was the Engineer of Record for the project, MJ Engineering and Land Surveying was the civil engineer and surveyor, and Kubricky Construction Corp. was a major construction contractor. Shannon-Rose Design of Saratoga Springs provided graphic design for the bridge artifacts.
