= USS Amsterdam =

USS Amsterdam may refer to either of two U.S. Navy ships named for Amsterdam, New York:

- USS Amsterdam (CL-59), was to have been a light cruiser numbered CL-59, but she was completed as the light aircraft carrier Independence (CVL-22).
- USS Amsterdam (CL-101), was a light cruiser, commissioned in 1945 and briefly participated in the final campaign against Japan.
