= Amsterdam Free Library =

- U.S. National Register of Historic Places
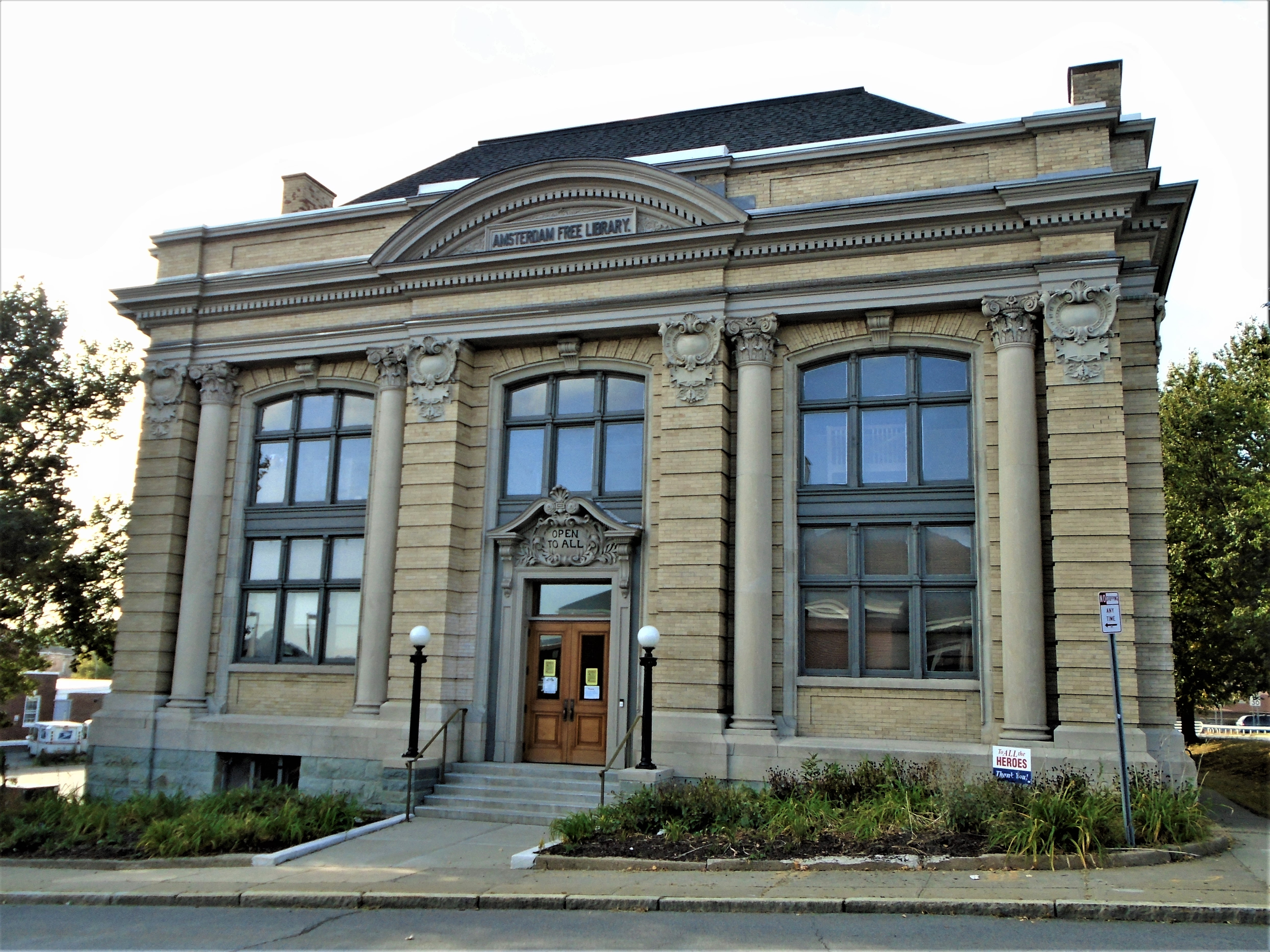
- (2020)

- Location within New York Location within the United States
- Location: 28 Church Street; Amsterdam, New York
- Coordinates: 42°56′15.4″N 74°11′26.6″W
- Built: 1903
- Architect: Albert W. Fuller
- Architectural style: Beaux-Arts
- NRHP reference No.: 100004800
- Added to NRHP: December 23, 2019

The Amsterdam Free Library, located at 28 Church Street in Amsterdam, Montgomery County, New York was built from 1902 to 1903 and was designed by Albert W. Fuller in the Beaux-Arts style. It is a Carnegie library, the building of which was funded by philanthropist Andrew Carnegie, who contributed $25,000.

The library was added to the National Register of Historic Places in 2019.
