= Greene Mansion =

Historic house in New York, United States

- U.S. National Register of Historic Places
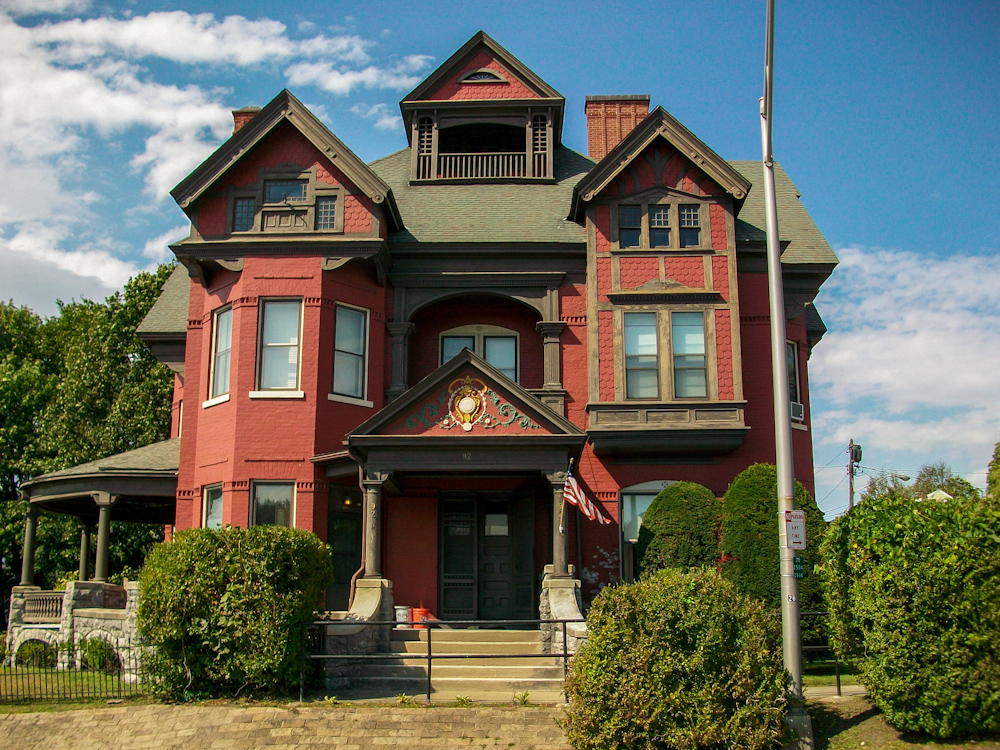
- (2012)

- Location within New York
- Location: 92 Market St., Amsterdam, New York
- Coordinates: 42°56′24″N 74°11′27″W
- Area: 0.3 acres (0.12 ha)
- Built: 1881
- NRHP reference No.: 79001590
- Added to NRHP: December 31, 1979

Greene Mansion is a historic home located at 92 Market Street in Amsterdam, Montgomery County, New York. It was built in 1881 as a residence for Henry Eckford Greene, who died two months after it was completed and never lived in it. Henry Greene was one of two sons of William Kimball Greene, who founded the Greene Knitting Mills, the first carpet factory in Amsterdam. The Greene family built a number of beautiful houses on Market Street, of which the Greene Mansion is one.

The mansion is a large two story, irregular brick building with a steeply pitched slate roof and attic gables. It features an oriel window, covered wooden balconies, and porches.

It was added to the National Register of Historic Places in 1979.
