= Greater Amsterdam School District =

School district in Amsterdam, New York, United States

Address
- 140 Saratoga Avenue Amsterdam, New York, 12010; United States

District information
- Type: Public
- Grades: PreK–12
- NCES District ID: 3602970

Students and staff
- Students: 3,702
- Teachers: 234.71
- Staff: 254.39
- Student–teacher ratio: 15.77

Other information
- Website: www.gasd.org

Greater Amsterdam School District is a school district headquartered in Amsterdam, New York.

== Schools ==
- Amsterdam High School
- Barkley Elementary School
- Curie Institute School
- McNulty Academy School
- Tecler Elementary School
- Lynch Literacy Academy School
