= Amsterdam, New York =

City in New York, United States

- City
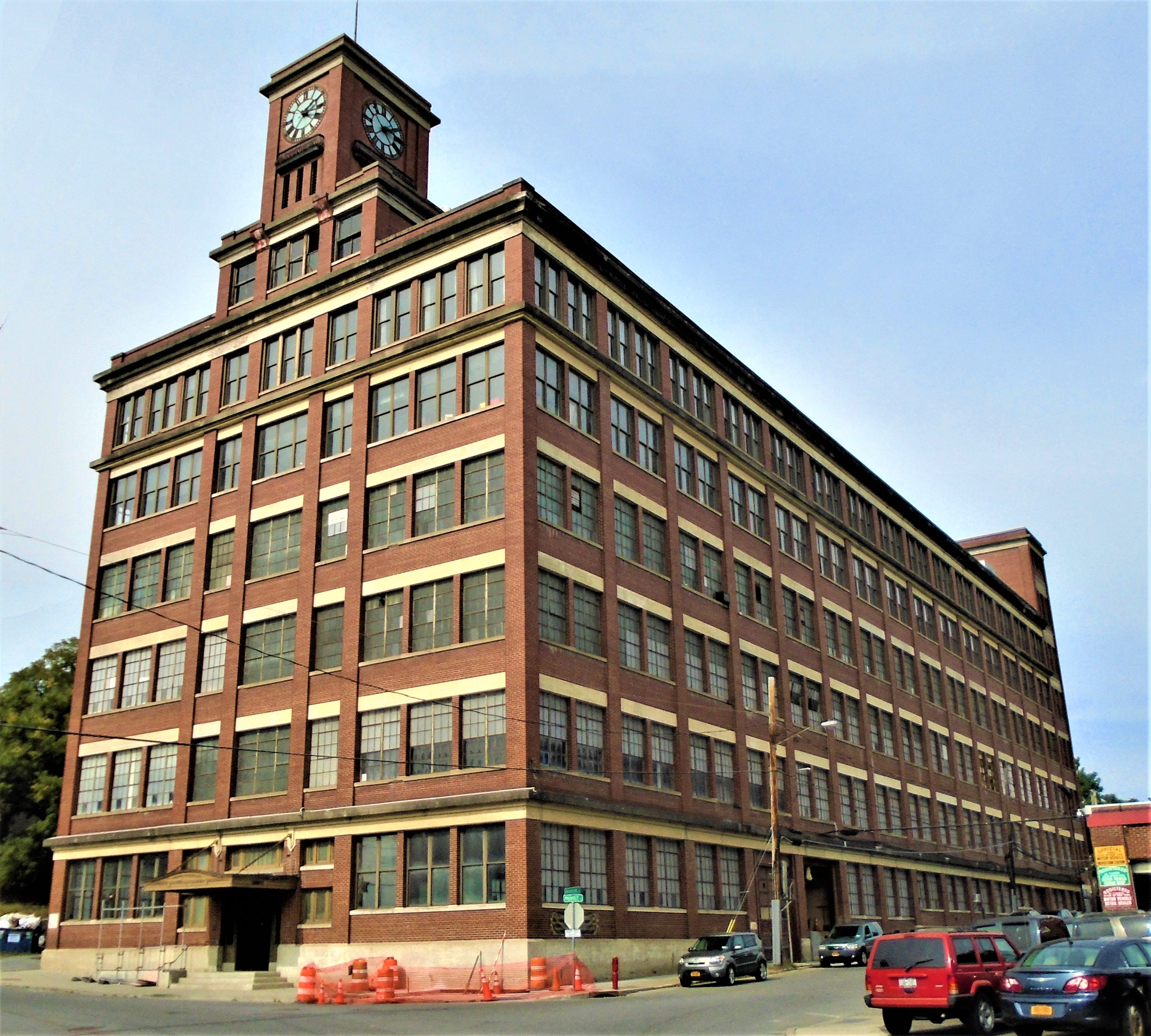
- The Sanford Clock Tower, built in 1922

- Flag

- Location within Montgomery County and the state of New York

- Location within New York Location within the United States
- Coordinates: 42°57′N 74°11′W
- Country: United States
- State: New York
- County: Montgomery
- Incorporated (village): 1830
- Incorporated (city): 1885

Government
  - Type: Mayor-council
  - Mayor: Michael Cinquanti (I)
  - City council: Members' List: •Ward 1: Patrick Russo (R); •Ward 2: Paul Ochal (R); •Ward 3: Irene Collins (D); •Ward 4: David Dybas (D); •Ward 5: James Martuscello (D)

Area
  - Total: 6.26 sq mi (16.21 km^{2})
  - Land: 5.87 sq mi (15.21 km^{2})
  - Water: 0.39 sq mi (1.00 km^{2})
- Elevation: 360 ft (110 m)

Population (2020)
  - Total: 18,219
  - Density: 3,102.3/sq mi (1,197.82/km^{2})
- Time zone: UTC−05 (Eastern (EST))
  - Summer (DST): UTC−04 (EDT)
- ZIP code: 12010
- Area codes: 518 and 838
- FIPS code: 36-02066
- GNIS feature ID: 0942450
- Website: www.amsterdamny.gov

Amsterdam (/ˈæmstərdæm/) is the largest and most populated city in Montgomery County, New York, United States. It is located approximately 35 miles northwest of Albany, the state capital. As of the 2020 census, the city had a population of 18,219. The city is named after Amsterdam in the Netherlands.

The city of Amsterdam is bordered on the northern and eastern sides by the town of Amsterdam. The city developed on both sides of the Mohawk River, with the majority located on the north bank. The Port Jackson area on the south side is also part of the city.

== History ==
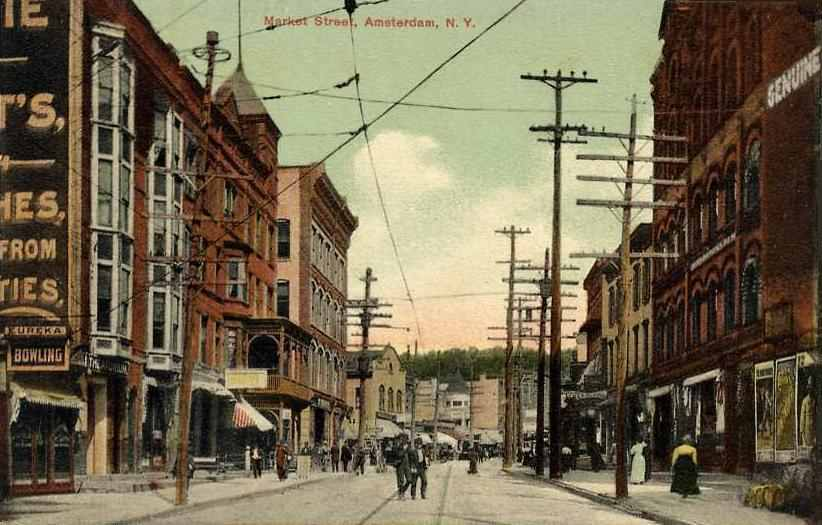
Market Street in 1909

Prior to settlement by Europeans, the region which includes Amsterdam was inhabited for centuries by the Mohawk tribe of the Iroquois Confederacy, which dominated most of the Mohawk Valley. They had pushed the Algonquin Mohican tribe to the east of the Hudson River.

Dutch settlers began to arrive in the area in the 1660s, founding Schenectady in 1664. They had previously been based in Albany, along the Hudson River to the east. They reached what would later be Amsterdam c.1710. They called the community "Veeders Mills" and "Veedersburgh" after Albert Veeder, an early mill owner. By the second decade of the 1700s, Scotch-Irish and German Palatinate immigrants began to arrive in the Mohawk Valley region, but few settled in Amsterdam. The governor of the colony granted a group of 100 Palatine German households land in the area that developed as Little Falls to the west, where the English planned they could serve as a buffer to French and Native American incursions.

The American Revolutionary War had little effect on the Amsterdam region. No major battles were fought there or in the surrounding region. The Battle of Johnstown was essentially the repelling of a raid by British forces and their Native American, mostly Iroquois, allies.

Amsterdam grew slowly after the war, primarily providing the services needed for the farming communities which surrounded it. It was located in the now-defunct town of Caughnawaga. When the Town of Amsterdam was created, the city changed its name to Amsterdam in 1803, possibly to encourage its selection as the seat of the town's government.

After the war, Loyalists such as the powerful Johnson family fled to Canada. Sir William Johnson had long been the British agent of Indian Affairs for this region. Many new land-hungry settlers came from New England as the state sold off former Iroquois lands for development. The settlement was incorporated as a village on April 20, 1830, from a section of the town of Amsterdam.

This was a period of rapid growth for the village, influenced by major transportation developments. In turn, the Mohawk Turnpike, the Erie Canal, and construction of the railroad across the valley improved trade. The steeply descending creeks in the region, which flowed from the foothills of the Adirondacks, were used to power an increasing number of mills. These manufactured goods were shipped from the region by land, canal and rail. Products such as linseed oil, brooms, knit ware, buttons, and iron goods were produced in the growing village, which became an important manufacturing center. It was best known, however, for its carpets, eventually becoming the carpet and rug manufacturing center of the U.S.

Through the late 19th and early 20th centuries, Amsterdam was a destination for immigrants from Europe: Irish, Italian, Polish, and Lithuanian peoples, among others, who found work in the factories.

In 1865, the population of Amsterdam was 5,135. New charters in 1854, 1865, and 1875 increased the size of the village. In 1885, Amsterdam incorporated as a city; it expanded by annexing Rockton to the north, and the former village of Port Jackson on the south side of the Mohawk River was annexed to become the fifth ward of the city. By 1920, the city's population was 33,524.

In the Great Depression, the mills slowed down their output but did not close. The city survived the two world wars without significant effect. Shortly after World War II, however, manufacturing in general began to move to the southern United States, where labor costs and taxes were lower. The mills of Amsterdam also shifted their jobs to the South. After a period in the South, that region lost industrial jobs to overseas locations.

Additionally, the second and third generations of the city's immigrant families often left to go to college and did not return, as there were few jobs to attract college-educated citizens. The city attempted to re-create its industrial base, but these efforts were not particularly successful.

Subsequent city and state projects intended for improved commuting and urban renewal resulted in eroding the local character of the city. As the city's website expresses it:

In an attempt to draw people and business back to Amsterdam, the City and State began a program of urban renewal and arterial roadway construction, destroying much of the original fabric of downtown. Now, not only is there less to go downtown for, it's harder to get there. Once again, Amsterdam is somewhere to be bypassed on the way to somewhere else.

In the early 21st century, post-industrial Amsterdam is still trying to re-invent itself. The city suffered serious flood damage in late August 2011, in the aftermath of Hurricane Irene. The flooding threatened properties at the river's edge due to erosion and water damage.

== Geography ==
Amsterdam is in eastern Montgomery County, 17 miles (27 km) northwest of Schenectady and 32 miles (51 km) northwest of Albany, the state capital. It is bordered to the north and east by the town of Amsterdam and to the south and west by the town of Florida.

According to the U.S. Census Bureau, the city has a total area of 6.26 square miles (16.2 km^{2}), of which 5.87 square miles (15.2 km^{2}) are land and 0.39 square miles (1.01 km^{2}), or 6.18%, are water. The Mohawk River passes through the city south of the downtown area, with the Erie Canal part of the river. North Chuctanunda Creek and South Chuctanunda Creek flow into the Mohawk at Amsterdam.

New York State Route 30, a north-south highway called Market Street in part, crosses the Mohawk River to link the main part of Amsterdam to the New York State Thruway. NY-30 leads north to Mayfield and on into the Adirondacks, and south to Schoharie and thence into the Catskills. NY-30 intersects east-west highways 5 and 67 in the city. NY-5 leads southeast to Schenectady and Albany and west to Utica, while NY-67 leads east to Ballston Spa. New York State Route 5S passes along the south side of the Mohawk River.

Amsterdam is currently within New York's 20th congressional district.

== Economy ==
In the 19th century, the city of Amsterdam was known for carpet, textile, broom, and pearl button manufacturing. It continued to be a center for carpet-making in the 20th century, when the Bigelow-Sanford and Mohawk Mills Carpet companies were located in Amsterdam, but these companies have since relocated to other regions. Amsterdam was also the home of Coleco, makers of the ColecoVision, Cabbage Patch Kids and the Coleco Adam. Founded in 1932 as the Connecticut Leather Company, Coleco went bankrupt in 1988 after a failed attempt to enter the electronics market, and pulled out of Amsterdam, as well as its other North American manufacturing sites.

The enclosed shopping center is named the Amsterdam Riverfront Center. Once filled with clothing shops, the mall complex has been adapted for offices of doctors, public assistance services, community organizations, a radio station, and an off-track betting site.

Historical population
Census	Pop.	Note	%±
1840	1,700		—
1850	2,000		17.6%
1860	2,044		2.2%
1870	5,426		165.5%
1880	9,466		74.5%
1890	17,336		83.1%
1900	20,929		20.7%
1910	31,267		49.4%
1920	33,524		7.2%
1930	34,817		3.9%
1940	33,329		−4.3%
1950	32,240		−3.3%
1960	28,772		−10.8%
1970	25,524		−11.3%
1980	21,872		−14.3%
1990	20,714		−5.3%
2000	18,355		−11.4%
2010	18,620		1.4%
2020	18,219		−2.2%
2021 (est.)	18,187		−0.2%

Media in Amsterdam includes one print newspaper, The Recorder, which is owned by the Schenectady-based Daily Gazette, an online newspaper, The Mohawk Valley Compass, and two AM radio stations, WVTL and WCSS.

In the early 2000s, distribution centers began being constructed in the Florida Business Park in the town of Florida, just outside of Amsterdam. The park currently holds Target, Hill & Marks, Alpin Haus, and most recently, Dollar General. In 2019, Vida Blend broke ground on a new distribution center in the park. Some thousands of city and adjacent county residents are now employed by these businesses. In 2026, Amazon started construction of a $621 million dollar warehouse.

== Demographics ==
=== Racial and ethnic composition ===
Amsterdam city, New York – racial and ethnic composition Note: the US Census treats Hispanic/Latino as an ethnic category. This table excludes Latinos from the racial categories and assigns them to a separate category. Hispanics/Latinos may be of any race.
Race / Ethnicity (NH = Non-Hispanic)	2020	2010	2000	1990	1980
White alone (NH)	55.4% (10,086)	68.1% (12,681)	80.6% (14,797)	86.6% (17,942)	92.5% (20,229)
Black alone (NH)	4.2% (765)	2.7% (496)	1.6% (294)	1% (211)	0.8% (166)
American Indian alone (NH)	0.3% (49)	0.3% (53)	0.2% (28)	0.1% (21)	0.1% (27)
Asian alone (NH)	1.4% (262)	0.8% (153)	0.7% (129)	0.5% (113)	0.4% (84)
Pacific Islander alone (NH)	0% (4)	0% (2)	0% (4)		
Other race alone (NH)	0.6% (114)	0.2% (39)	0% (9)	0.1% (22)	0% (0)
Multiracial (NH)	4.5% (828)	1.7% (323)	0.8% (153)	—	—
Hispanic/Latino (any race)	33.5% (6,111)	26.2% (4,873)	16% (2,941)	11.6% (2,405)	6.2% (1,366)

=== 2020 census ===
As of the 2020 census, Amsterdam had a population of 18,219. The median age was 37.2 years; 24.5% of residents were under the age of 18 and 17.2% were 65 years of age or older. For every 100 females there were 91.9 males, and for every 100 females age 18 and over there were 89.0 males age 18 and over.

99.8% of residents lived in urban areas, while 0.2% lived in rural areas.

There were 7,579 households in Amsterdam, of which 29.7% had children under the age of 18 living in them. Of all households, 29.5% were married-couple households, 22.8% were households with a male householder and no spouse or partner present, and 36.0% were households with a female householder and no spouse or partner present. About 35.6% of all households were made up of individuals and 15.5% had someone living alone who was 65 years of age or older.

There were 9,070 housing units, of which 16.4% were vacant. The homeowner vacancy rate was 2.4% and the rental vacancy rate was 9.0%.

The population density was 3,102.7 people per square mile.

Racial composition as of the 2020 census
Race	Number	Percent
White	11,689	64.2%
Black or African American	1,010	5.5%
American Indian and Alaska Native	105	0.6%
Asian	270	1.5%
Native Hawaiian and Other Pacific Islander	11	0.1%
Some other race	2,518	13.8%
Two or more races	2,616	14.4%
Hispanic or Latino (of any race)	6,111	33.5%

The most reported ancestries were:

- Puerto Rican (26.2%)
- Italian (16.2%)
- Irish (12%)
- German (9.6%)
- English (8.5%)
- Polish (8.1%)
- African American (3.7%)
- French (2.7%)
- Dutch (2.3%)
- Dominican (2.1%)

The median household income was $43,164, and the per capita income was $25,303. 23.8% of the population were below the poverty line.

=== 2010 census ===
As of the census of 2010, there were 18,620 people, 8,324 households, and 4,721 families residing in the city. The population density was 3,176.4 inhabitants per square mile (1,226.4/km^{2}). There were 9,218 housing units at an average density of 1,573 per square mile (607/km^{2}). The racial makeup of the city was 80.4% White (68.1% Non Hispanic White), 3.8% Black or African American, 0.6% Native American, 0.9% Asian, 0% Pacific Islander and 3.4% from two or more races. 26.2% of the population were Hispanic or Latino of any race.

There were 8,146 households in the city, with the average household size being 2.24 persons. In the city, 25.0% of the people were under the age of 18 and 15.8% were age 65 or older. The median income for a household in the city, based on data from 2007 to 2011, was $38,699.

== Transportation ==
Amsterdam is at the convergence of State Routes 5, 5S, 30, and 67. The New York State Thruway/Interstate 90 is slightly less than one mile to the southwest of the city.

Amsterdam has passenger rail access provided by Amtrak. Three trains stop daily at the Amsterdam Station located off State Route 5 in the western part of the city. There have been past studies looking at the feasibility of moving the train station back to the downtown area, but as of 2026 there have been no official plans to do so.

- The Maple Leaf, operating between Toronto Union Station, and New York Penn Station
- Two Empire Service trains, operating between Niagara Falls and New York Penn Station

In 2022, CDTA began providing bus services with two inner-city routes, a Thruway Express route, and an Amsterdam-Schenectady route.

The City of Amsterdam has two Level 3 DC Fast Chargers for electric vehicles provided by the New York Power Authority's Evolve NY program. These chargers are located at the city-owned parking lot in downtown near the Amsterdam Free Library. Other chargers are located throughout the city at various parks.

== Sports ==
- Amsterdam's municipal golf course was designed by Robert Trent Jones.
- The city is home to the Amsterdam Mohawks baseball team of the Perfect Game Collegiate Baseball League. The team plays at Shuttleworth Park.
- The Professional Wrestling Hall of Fame was located in Amsterdam until November 2015, when it relocated to Wichita Falls, Texas.

== Places of interest ==
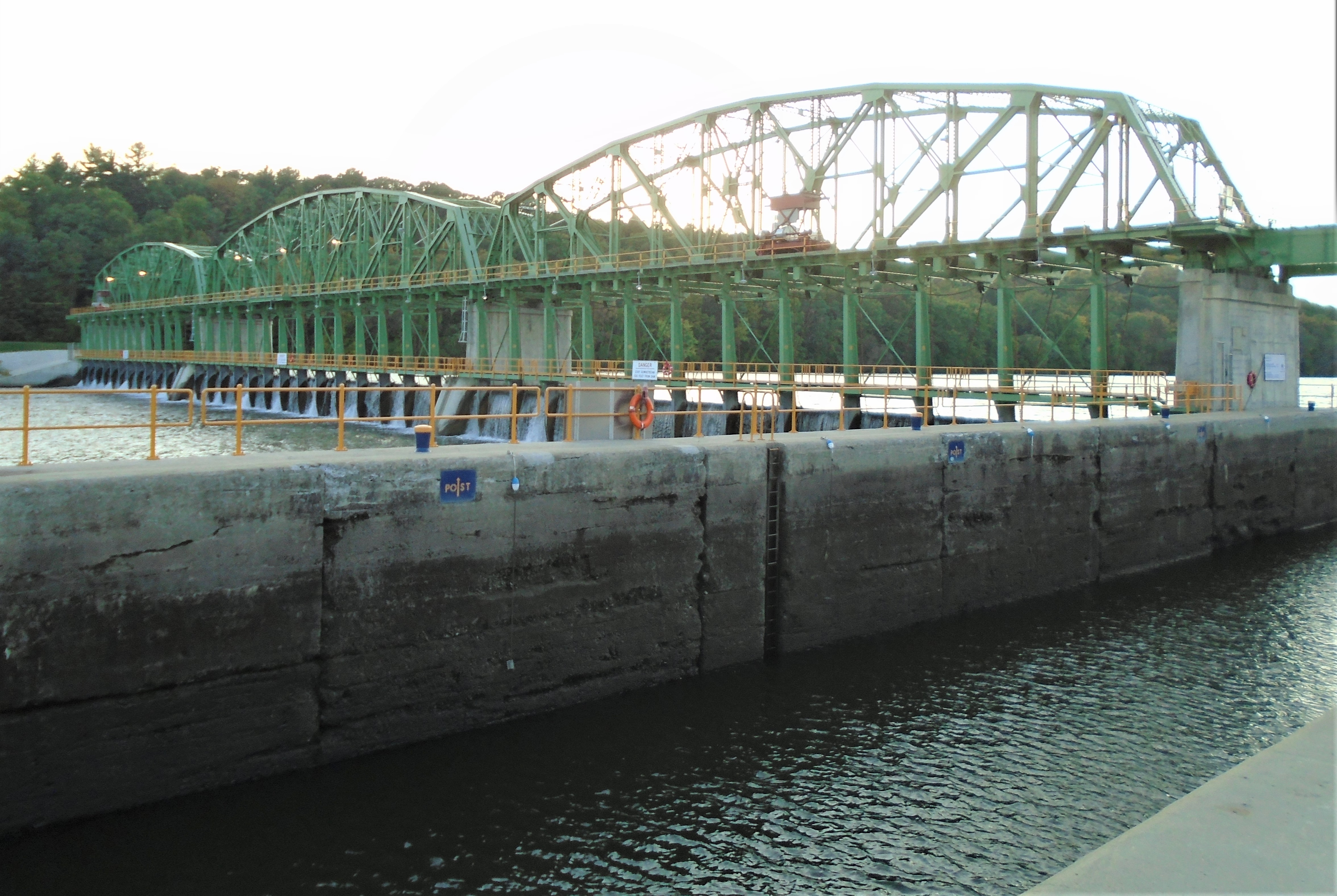
Lock E11 includes a truss structure which spans the river and which has multiple steel gates which can be opened and closed by the use of electric winches in order to dam the river or let it flow freely. Seven other locks have these trusses, but only two of them carry roadways; this is not one of them.

- The Mohawk Valley Gateway Overlook pedestrian bridge spans the Mohawk River and connects the city's Bridge Street downtown area on the south shore and Riverlink Park on the north. It was built from 2014 to 2016.
- Lock E11 was built to facilitate water traffic on the Mohawk River/Erie Canal; it is one of eight locks which include a truss structure which spans the river and which has multiple steel gates which can be opened and closed by the use of electric winches in order to dam the river or let it flow freely.
- The Sanford Clock Tower, also known as the Sanford Mills, the Hasbro Plant, the Coleco Industries Plant – where Cabbage Patch Dolls and ColecoVision were manufactured in the 1970s and 1980s – and, currently, the Clock Tower Complex, was built in 1922 for the heirs of carpet magnate Stephen Sanford as the headquarters and a mill of the Sanford Carpet Company. The current owners, who bought the property in 2001, hope to attract small businesses and professional as well as manufacturing and warehousing businesses to the building.

Although ill-considered urban renewal highway projects did significant damage to the city's historic downtown, a few historic buildings and sites, mostly from the 19th and 20th centuries, remain in the city, and are listed on the National Register of Historic Places (NRHP):

- Amsterdam (46th Separate Company) Armory was built in 1895 as an armory for the New York Army National Guard and was decommissioned in 1994. It is now a bed and breakfast inn called the Amsterdam Castle;
- Amsterdam City Hall was built in 1869 as the residence of carpet magnate Stephen Sanford. In 1932 it was deeded to the city to become its city hall;
- the Amsterdam Free Library is a Carnegie library which was built in 1903;
- the Gray-Jewett House, was built in 1890;
- Green Hill Cemetery;
- the Greene Mansion was built in 1881;
- Guy Park Manor was built in 1774 in the Georgian style for Guy Johnson, the Irish-born nephew and son-in-law to Sir William Johnson, 1st Baronet, the British Superintendent for Indian Affairs in colonial New York. It replaced an earlier house which burnt down. The house and the land it is located on sustained significant damage from Hurricane Irene; the house is located in close proximity to Lock E11;
- the Guy Park Avenue School was built in 1902 and ceased being used as a school in 1968;
- Samuel Sweet Canal Store was built in 1847 to service barges on the Erie Canal as both a store and a forwarding warehouse;
- the Saint Stanislaus Roman Catholic Church Complex contains a church (1897, enlarged 1912), a school building (1906, closed in 2011), a former convent, now the parish center (1934) and a rectory (1941);
- the Temple of Israel is a synagogue built in 1901;
- United States Post Office built in 1936; and
- Vrooman Avenue School, built in 1916 and ceased operating as a school in 1975; it is now an apartment building.

The Chalmers Knitting Mills was added to the NRHP in 2010, but was later demolished.

== Houses of worship ==
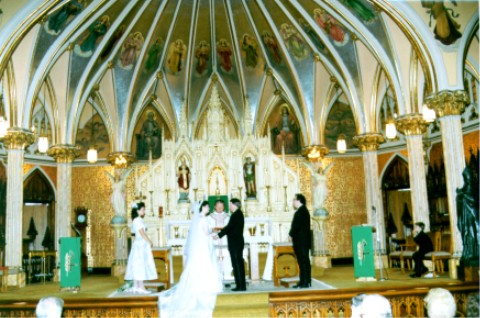
The interior of St. Stanislaus Church, Amsterdam, New York

- Calvary Assembly of God (Pentecostal)
- Kingdom Hall of Jehovah's Witnesses
- Congregation Sons of Israel (Jewish)
- Covenant Presbyterian Church
- Crossroads Community Church (independent)
- Five Buddha Temple
- First [Baptist Church of Amsterdam
- First Reformed Church
- Goddess of Mercy Temple (Buddhist)
- Iglesia de Dios, Torre Fuerte (Hispanic Pentecostal)
- Lord of the Harvest Church (Non-denominational)
- Our Lady of Mount Carmel (Catholic)
- Pilgrim Holiness Church
- Salvation Army
- Segunda Sinagoga (Pentocostal)
- Seventh-day Adventist Church
- St. Ann's (Episcopal)
- St. Luke's (Lutheran)
- St. Mary's (Roman Catholic)
- St. Nicholas (Ukrainian Catholic)
- St. Stanislaus (Roman Catholic)
- The Time for Truth
- Trinity Lutheran
- United Presbyterian Church

== Education ==
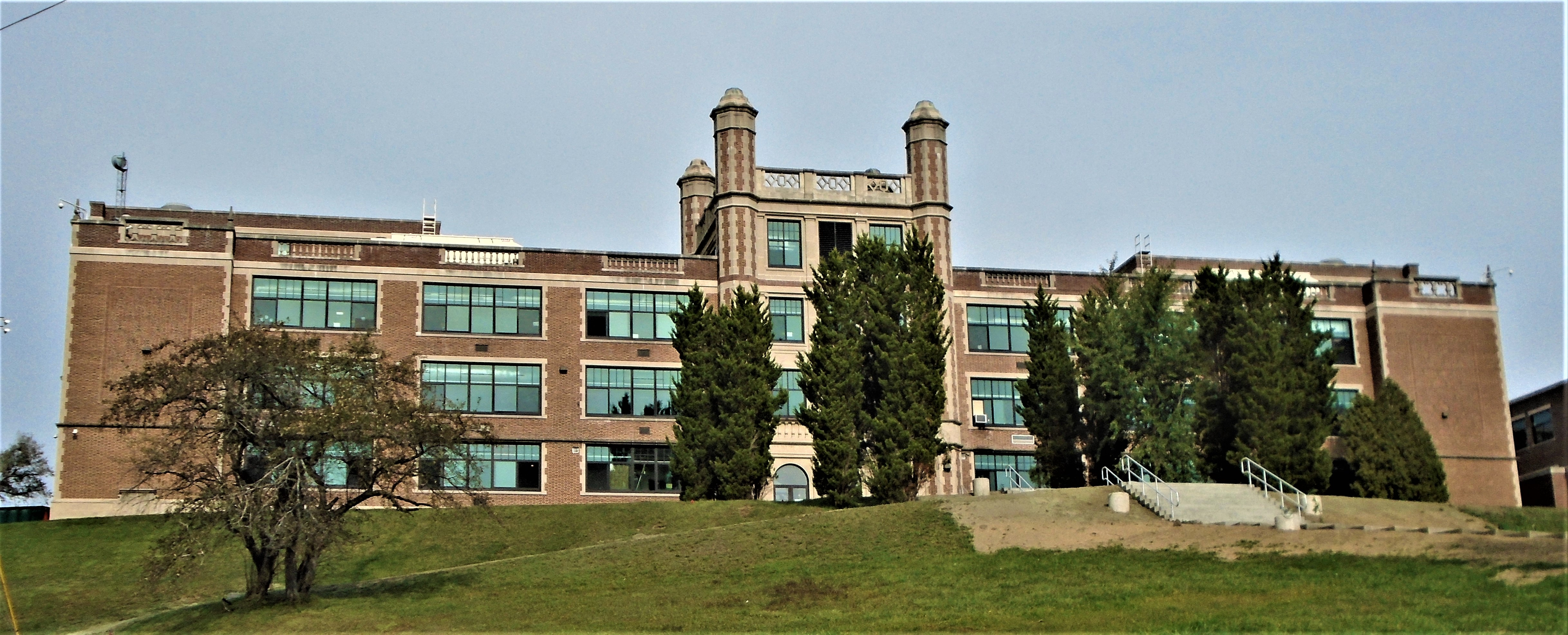
Wilbur Lynch School

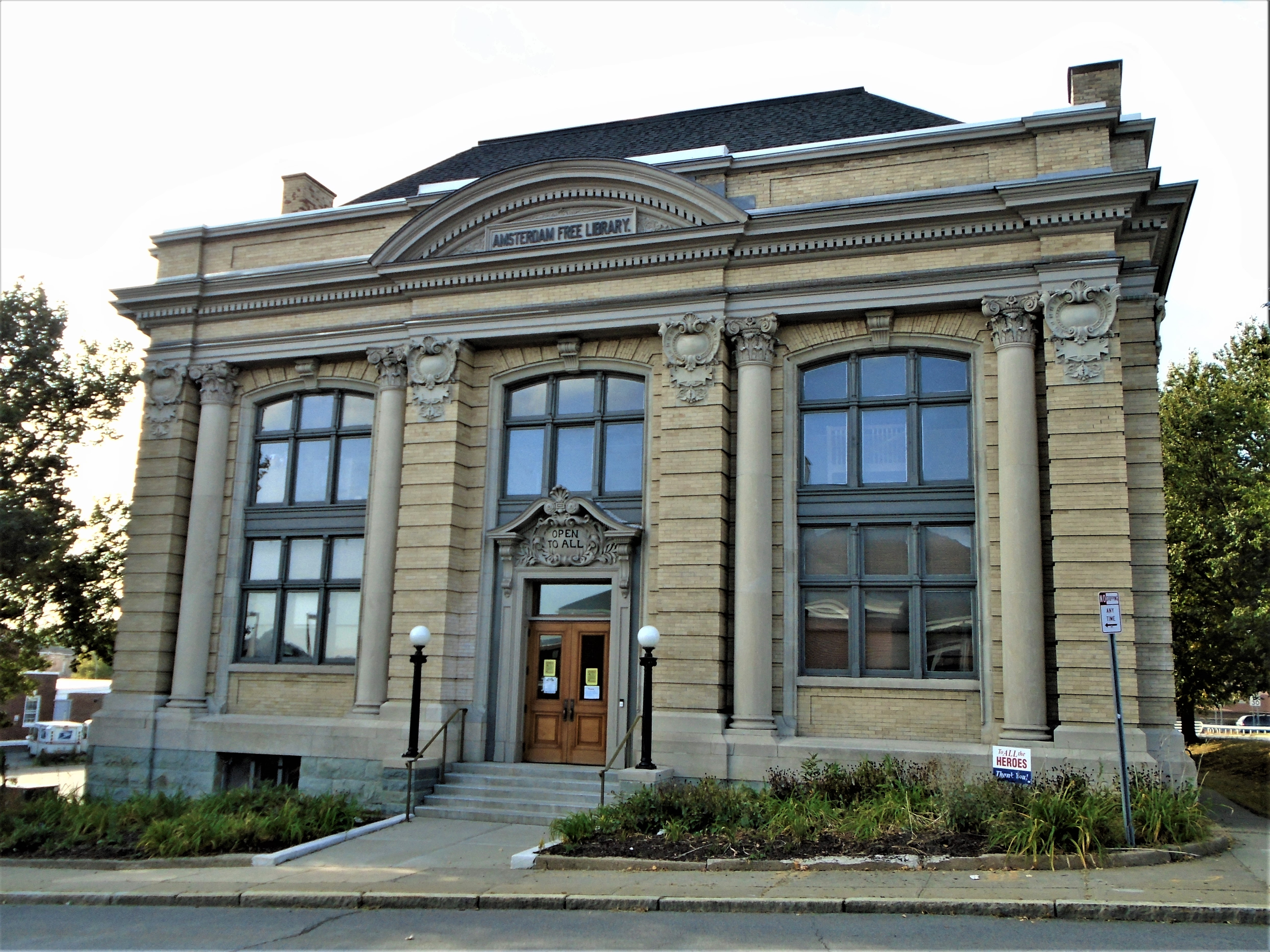
The Amsterdam Free Library

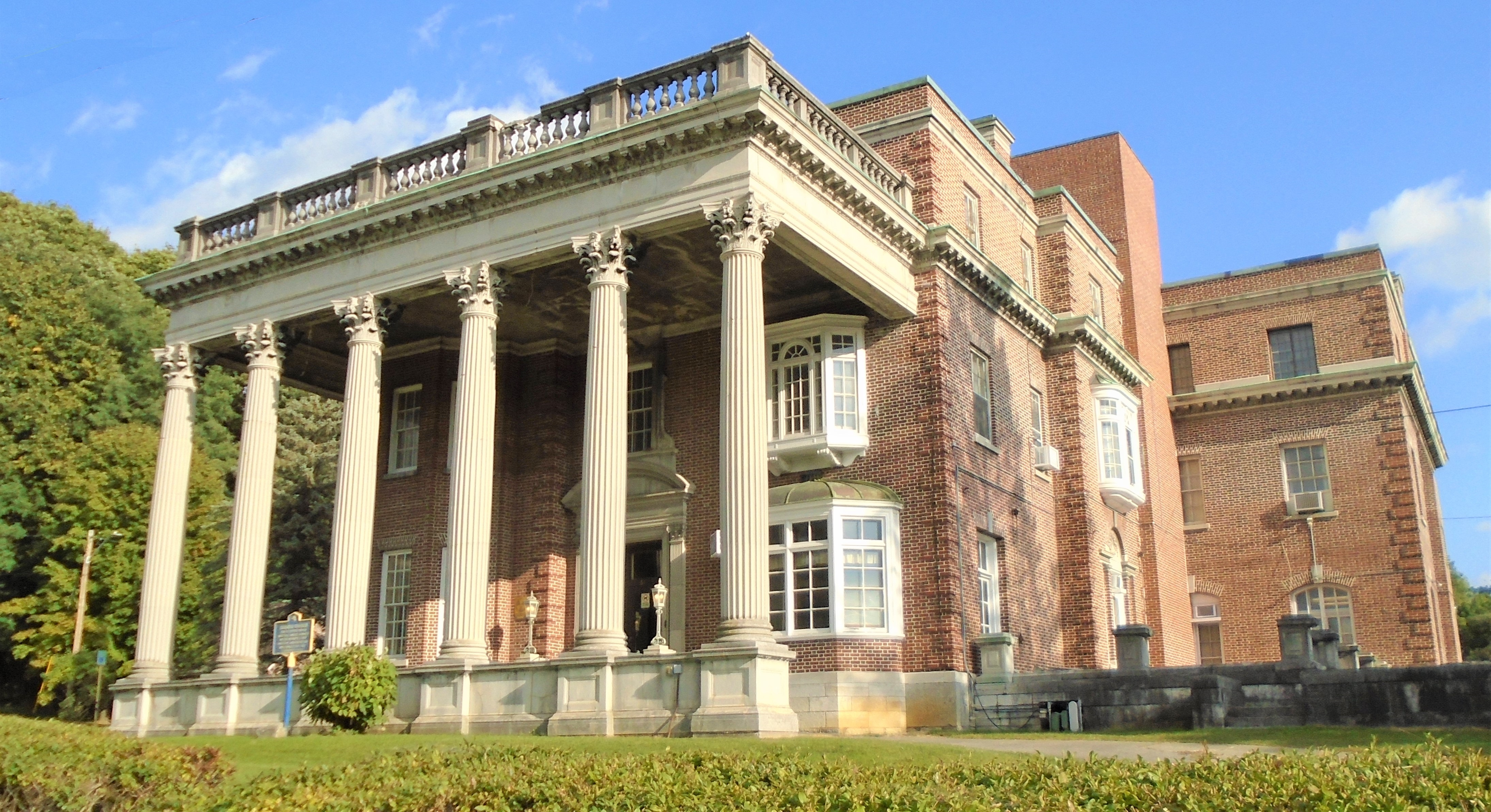
City Hall, formerly the Sanford Mansion

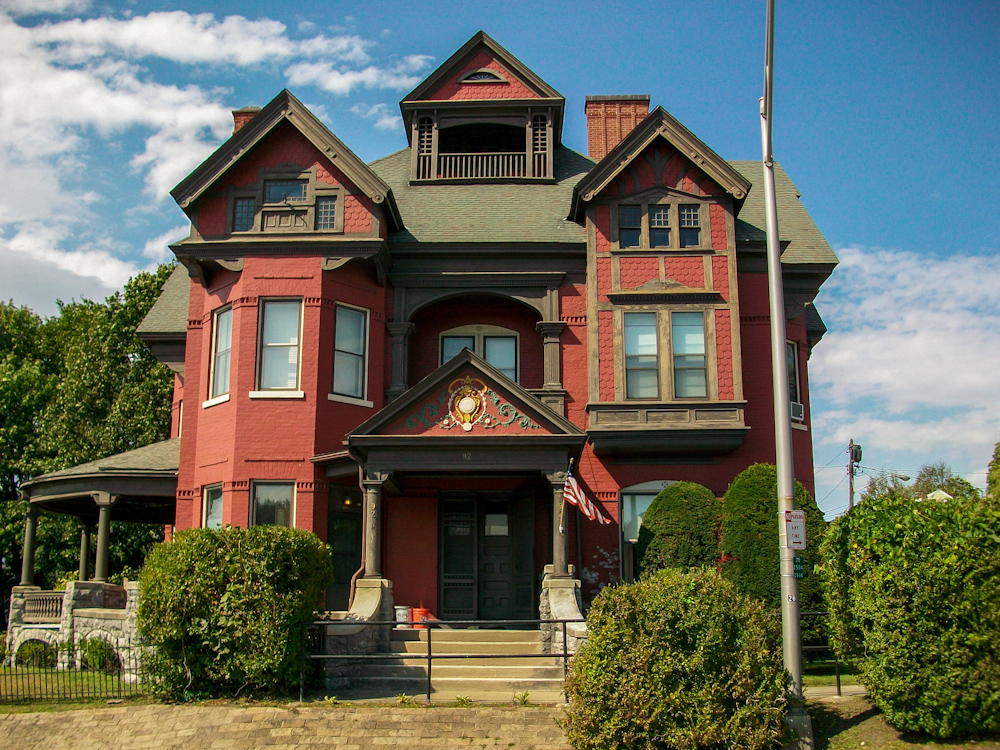
The Greene Mansion in 2012

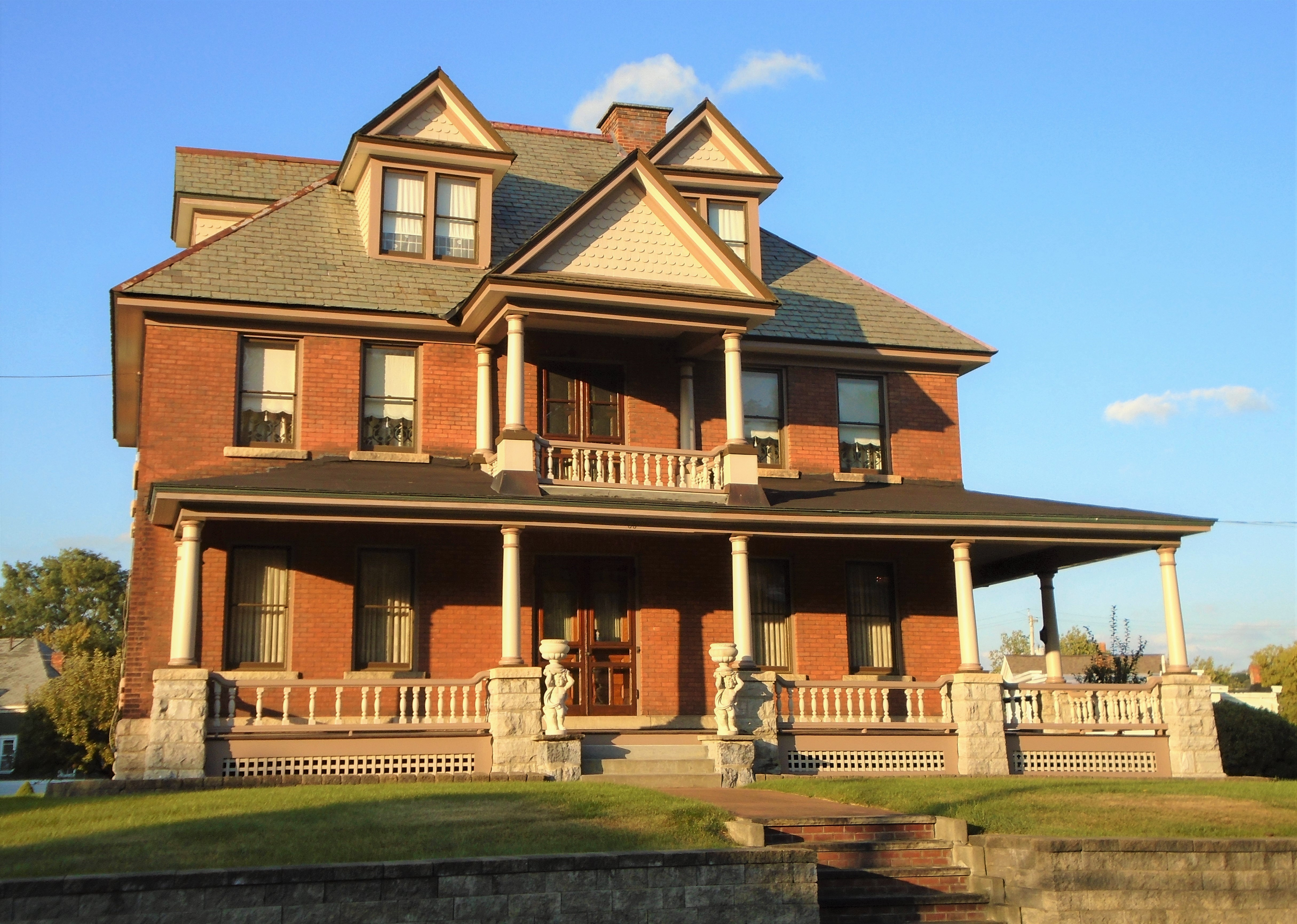
The Gray-Jewett House

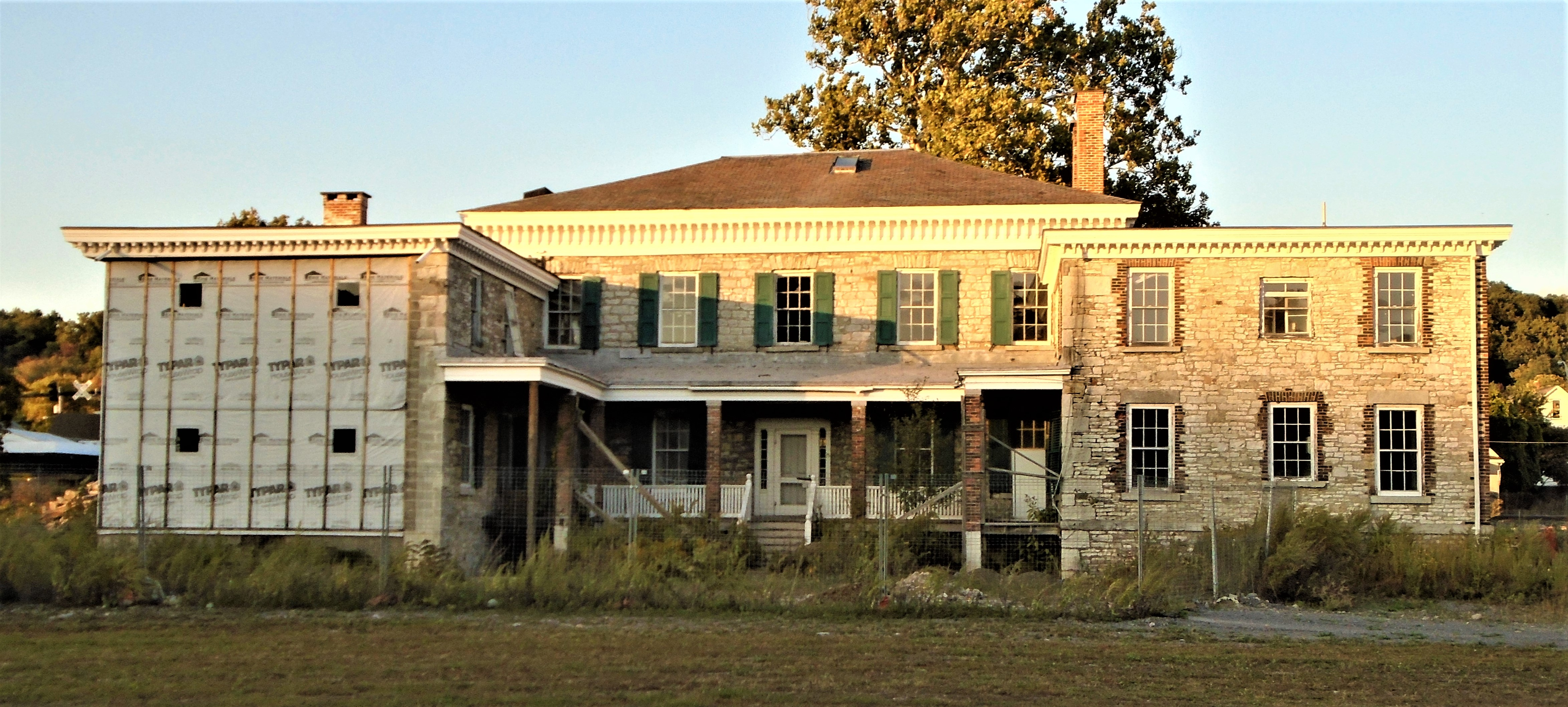
Guy Park Manor in 2020

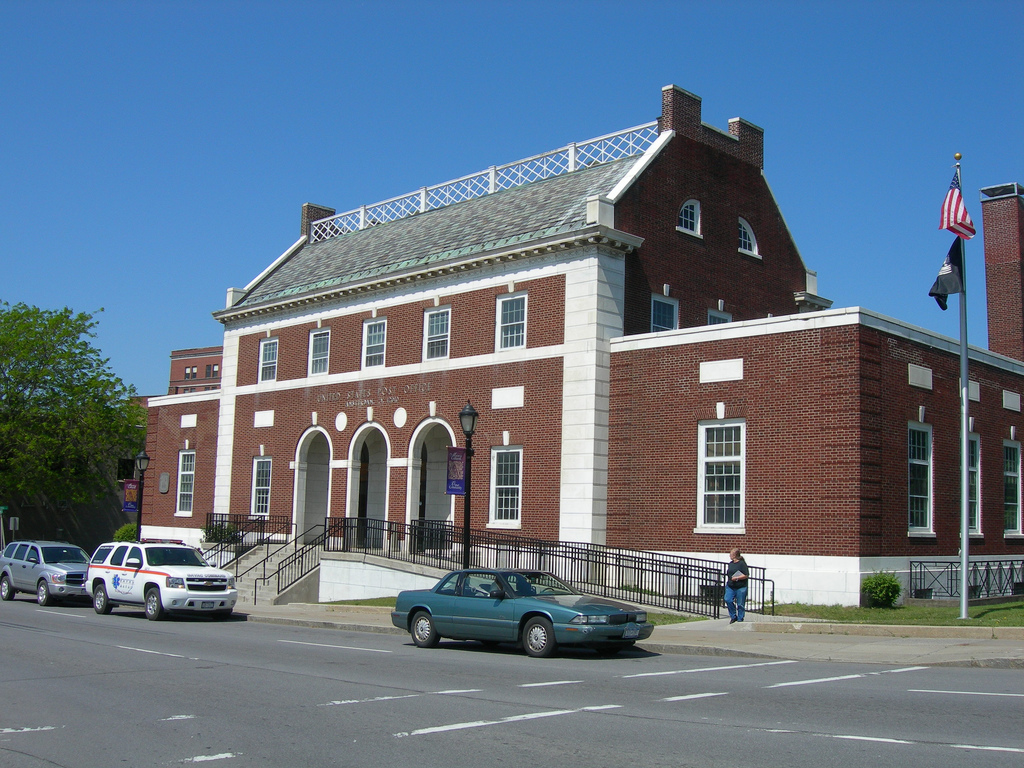
The Post Office

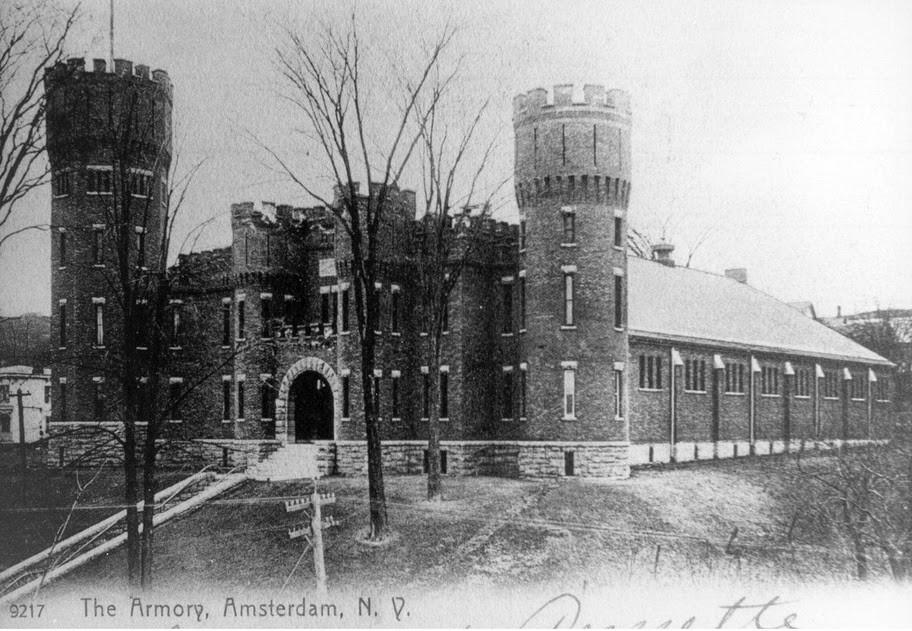
The Amsterdam Armory, now a bed & breakfast inn

=== Public schools ===
Elementary

- William H. Barkley Elementary School
- William B. Tecler Elementary School (part of the Greater Amsterdam School District, located in the Town of Amsterdam)
- Marie Curie Elementary School
- Raphael J. McNulty Elementary School

Secondary

- Wilbur H. Lynch Literacy Academy
- Amsterdam High School (part of the Greater Amsterdam School District, located in the Town of Amsterdam)

=== Private schools ===
- St. Mary's Institute

=== Library ===
The Amsterdam Free Library at 28 Church Street is a Carnegie library built in 1902-1903 with $25,000 from philanthropist Andrew Carnegie. It was designed by Albert W. Fuller in the Beaux-Arts style.

=== Arts ===
Amsterdam is rich in the arts. Amsterdam High School is the home of the award-winning Amsterdam Marching Rams, one of the top marching bands in the area. AHS also supports a thriving theater program, with performances housed in the Bert DeRose Theatre.

Amsterdam also has opportunities for music within the community. The Mohawk Valley Choir has three ensembles: one for elementary-aged, one for middle-high school aged, and one for adults. The Mohawk Valley Chamber Ensembles are an extension of this program.

== Government ==
Amsterdam's government consists of a city council and a mayor. The mayor is elected in a citywide vote. A term for mayor is four years, and there is currently not a term limit for the position. The council consists of five members each elected from wards. Previously, the city featured eight wards and eight council members. Current Mayor, Michael Cinquanti, recently announced he will not seek reelection in 2027 after two consecutive terms. His current term ends on December 31st, 2027.

=== Mayors ===
Name	party	Year(s)
Carmichael, John	Dem.	1885
Kline, Harlan P.	Rep.	1886
Liddle, Thomas	Rep.	1887–88
Dwyer, John F.	Dem.	1889
Waldron, Hicks B.	Dem.	1890
Breedon, William A.	Rep.	1891–92
Nisbet, Charles S.	Dem.	1893
Hannon, George R.	Rep.	1894
Pabis, David R.	Rep.	1895–96
Kaufman, William H.	Rep.	1897
Westbrook, Zerah S.	Dem.	1898–99
Wallin, Samuel	Rep.	1900–01
Gardner, William A.	Dem.	1902–03
Clark, Robert N.	Dem.	1904–05
Dealy, Jacob H.	Dem.	1906–09
Conover, Seely	Rep.	1910–11
Dealy, Jacob H.	Dem.	1912–13
Cline, James R.	Rep.	1914–17
Conover, Seely	Rep.	1918–19
Theron Akin	Rep., Dem., Soc.	1920–23
Salmon, Carl S.	Rep.	1924–29
Gardner, William A.	Dem.	1930–31
Brumagin, Robert B.	Rep.	1932–33
Carter, Arthur	Dem.	1934–43
Lynch, Wilbur H.	Rep.	1944–45
Hand, Joseph P.	Dem.	1946–47
Deal, Burtiss E.	Rep.	1948–55
Martuscello, Frank J.	Rep.	1956–57
Gregg, Thomas F.	Dem.	1958–59
Martuscello, Frank J.	Rep.	1960–63
Breier, Marcus I.	Rep.	1964–67
Gomulka, John P.	Dem.	1968–79
Villa, Mario	Rep.	1980–87
Parillo, Paul	Dem.	1988–91
Villa, Mario	Ind.	1992–1995
Duchessi, John M.	Dem.	1996–2003
Emanuele, Joseph	Rep.	2004–2007
Thane, Ann M.	Dem.	2008–2015
Villa, Michael	Rep.	2016–2019
Cinquanti, Michael	Ind.	2020-Incumbent

== Notable people ==
Notable natives or residents of Amsterdam include:

- Gary Aldrich, FBI agent assigned to the White House under Presidents George H. W. Bush and Clinton; author of a book about the Clinton administration
- Bruce Anderson, Medal of Honor recipient, American Civil War soldier
- Benedict Arnold (1780–1849), U.S. congressman from New York
- Felix Joseph Aulisi, New York Supreme Court justice, Appellate Division
- Josh Beekman, former National Football League offensive guard (Chicago Bears)
- Benjamin Paul Blood, inventor, poet, and philosopher
- Matthias J. Bovee, congressman from New York
- Roger Bowman, professional baseball player
- Lucille Bremer, actress
- Tim Buckley, musician
- Tom Catena, physician, humanitarian
- Todd Cetnar, played professional basketball in the United Kingdom
- William B. Charles, congressman
- Jessica Collins (birth name: Jessica Capogna), actress
- Charles Dayan, congressman from New York and lieutenant governor of New York
- Kirk Douglas, actor
- W. Barlow Dunlap, lawyer, member of the New York State Assembly, Surrogate of Montgomery County
- Andre Jackson Jr., guard, Milwaukee Bucks, NBA
- Rene Juchli (1889-1965), Amsterdam physician and US Army medical officer for the Nuremberg trials
- Mary Anne Krupsak, New York State lieutenant governor
- John Henry Manny, inventor of the Manny Reaper
- H. Edmund Machold, Speaker of the New York State Assembly
- Chris Marcil, television producer, writer, and actor
- George Miles, Michigan Supreme Court justice
- Marilyn Hall Patel, federal judge for United States District Court for the Northern District of California, vacated the conviction of Fred Korematsu of the 1944 Supreme Court ruling in Korematsu v. United States
- Rocco Petrone, Apollo program director
- Todd Pettengill, former professional wrestling show host and announcer for World Wrestling Entertainment
- David Pietrusza, author, historian, memoirist
- Josh Riley, U.S. representative
- Homer P. Snyder, congressman
- Lewis Strang, racing driver
- Vernon Tichenor, Wisconsin State Assemblyman
- Ray Tomlinson, implemented the first person-to-person network email
- Paul Tonko, congressman, former New York State Assemblyman
- Beth Van Duyne, congresswoman from Texas, former mayor of Irving, Texas, and former HUD official
- Samuel Wallin, congressman
- Willis Wendell, industrialist and New York state senator
- Harrison Wilson, Jr., educator and college basketball coach who served as the second president of Norfolk State University from 1975 to 1997
- Ruth Zakarian, Miss New York Teen USA 1983, Miss Teen USA 1983

== See also ==
USS Amsterdam, 2 ships
