= George Miles (Michigan jurist) =

American judge

George Miles (April 5, 1789 – August 25, 1850) was an American jurist and lawyer.

Born in Amsterdam, New York, Miles was admitted to the New York bar in 1822. Miles served as New York District Attorney for Allegany County, New York. In 1837, Miles moved to Ann Arbor, Michigan and continued to practice law. He was a Democrat. Miles served on the Michigan Supreme Court from 1846 until his death in 1850. Miles died in Ann Arbor, Michigan.
