= Canajoharie (disambiguation) =

Canajoharie was a major town in the Mohawk nation.

Canajoharie may also refer to:

- Canajoharie (town), New York
- Canajoharie (village), New York
- Canajoharie Creek
- Canajoharie Falls
- Canajoharie Central School District
- Canajoharie and Catskill Railroad
- Canajoharie Reservoir (Fulton County, New York)
- Canajoharie Reservoir (Montgomery County, New York)
- "Canajoharie", a song by They Might Be Giants from Join Us
