= Alonzo B. Coons =

American lawyer and politician (1841–1914)

Alonzo B. Coons (September 3, 1841 – March 26, 1914) was an American lawyer and politician from Sharon Springs, New York.

== Life ==
Coons was born on September 3, 1841, in Buel, Montgomery County, New York, the son of David Coons and Eliza Buttons.

Coons attended the Ames Academy in Ames from 1857 to 1858 and the New York Conference Seminary at Charlotteville in 1859. He initially worked as a clerk and teacher. He began studying law under John H. Salisbury at Sharon Springs in the spring of 1861. He was admitted to the bar in May 1863, although he spent the next five years working as a teacher and only opened a law office in April 1868. He opened his law office in Sharon Springs.

Coons was an alternate delegate to the 1884 Democratic National Convention. He was elected District Attorney of Schoharie County in November 1880. He served in that position from 1881 to 1884. In 1887, he was elected to the New York State Assembly as a Democrat, representing Schoharie County. He served in the Assembly in 1888 and 1890. In 1900, he was the Democratic candidate for the New York State Senate in New York's 27th State Senate district. He lost to Republican incumbent Hobart Krum. He was again elected District Attorney of Schoharie County in 1910 and 1913. He still held that office when he died.

Coons died on March 26, 1914. He had a wife and two daughters. His funeral was conducted by Sharon Springs Freemason lodge, which he was previously Master of. Grand Marshal E. M. Feathers of Springfield was in charge and Assemblyman Edward A. Dox of Richmondville attended the funeral. He was buried in Leesville Cemetery.

New York State Assembly
Preceded by Emory Stevens	New York State Assembly; Schoharie County; 1888	Succeeded by J. Edward Young
Preceded by J. Edward Young	New York State Assembly; Schoharie County; 1890	Succeeded by Ambrose R. Hunting
