= Brimstone Creek =

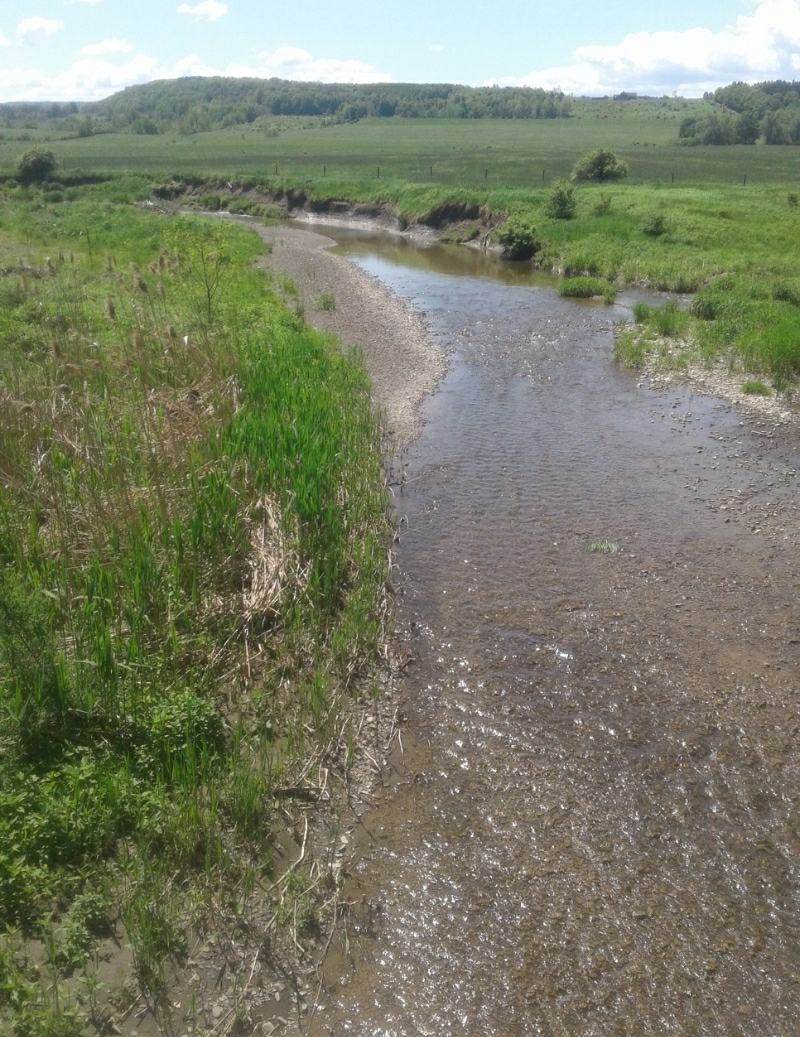
- Brimstone Creek west of the Village of Ames. Budd Hill is in the background.

- Location of the mouth within New York Brimstone Creek (the United States)

Location
- Country: United States
- State: New York
- Region: Central New York Region
- Counties: Schoharie, Montgomery
- Towns: Sharon, Canajoharie

Physical characteristics
- Source
  - location: East of Sharon Springs
  - coordinates: 42°47′47″N 74°34′19″W
- Mouth: Canajoharie Creek
  - location: North-northwest of Ames
  - coordinates: 42°50′48″N 74°36′28″W
  - elevation: 676 ft (206 m)
- Basin size: 14.9 mi^{2} (39 km^{2})

Brimstone Creek is a river in Schoharie County and Montgomery County in New York. It begins east of the Village of Sharon Springs and flows mostly in a northwest direction before flowing into Canajoharie Creek north-northwest of the Village of Ames.
