= Bowmans Creek =

River in New York, United States

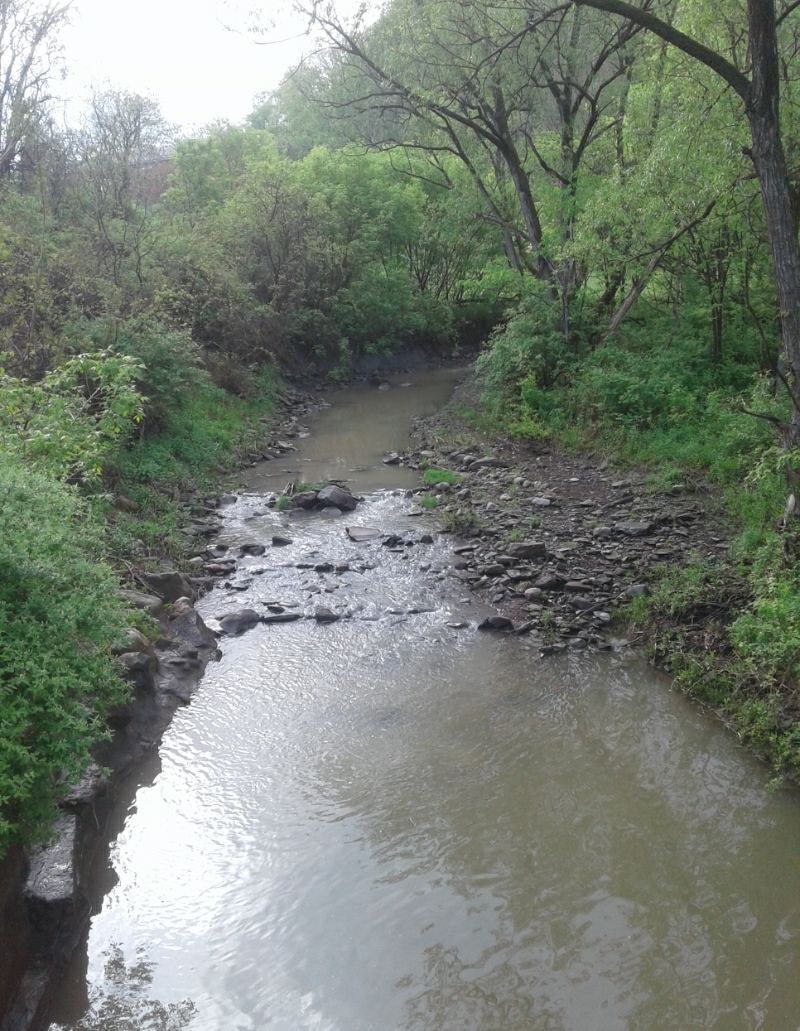
- Bowmans Creek north of Clinton Road, north of the hamlet of Sprout Brook
- Etymology: Jacob Bowman

Location
- Country: United States
- State: New York
- Region: Central New York Region
- County: Montgomery
- Towns: Minden, Canajoharie

Physical characteristics
- Source: Unnamed field
  - location: West of Hessville, New York
  - coordinates: 42°52′36″N 74°43′31″W
- Mouth: Canajoharie Creek
  - location: East of Sprout Brook, New York
  - coordinates: 42°50′58″N 74°40′39″W
  - elevation: 715 ft (218 m)
- Basin size: 6.2 mi^{2} (16 km^{2})

Bowmans Creek is a river in Montgomery County, New York. It begins west of the hamlet of Hessville and just south of the hamlet of Ripple Corners. It then flows in a mostly southeast direction for a few miles passing through the hamlet of Sprout Brook before flowing into the Canajoharie Creek just east of the hamlet of Sprout Brook.

== History ==
The river is named after Jacob Bowman, an early settler in the area. Around 1760 he bought a large tract of land near the creek. A number of Mr. Bowman's descendants reside in the area still.

== Course ==
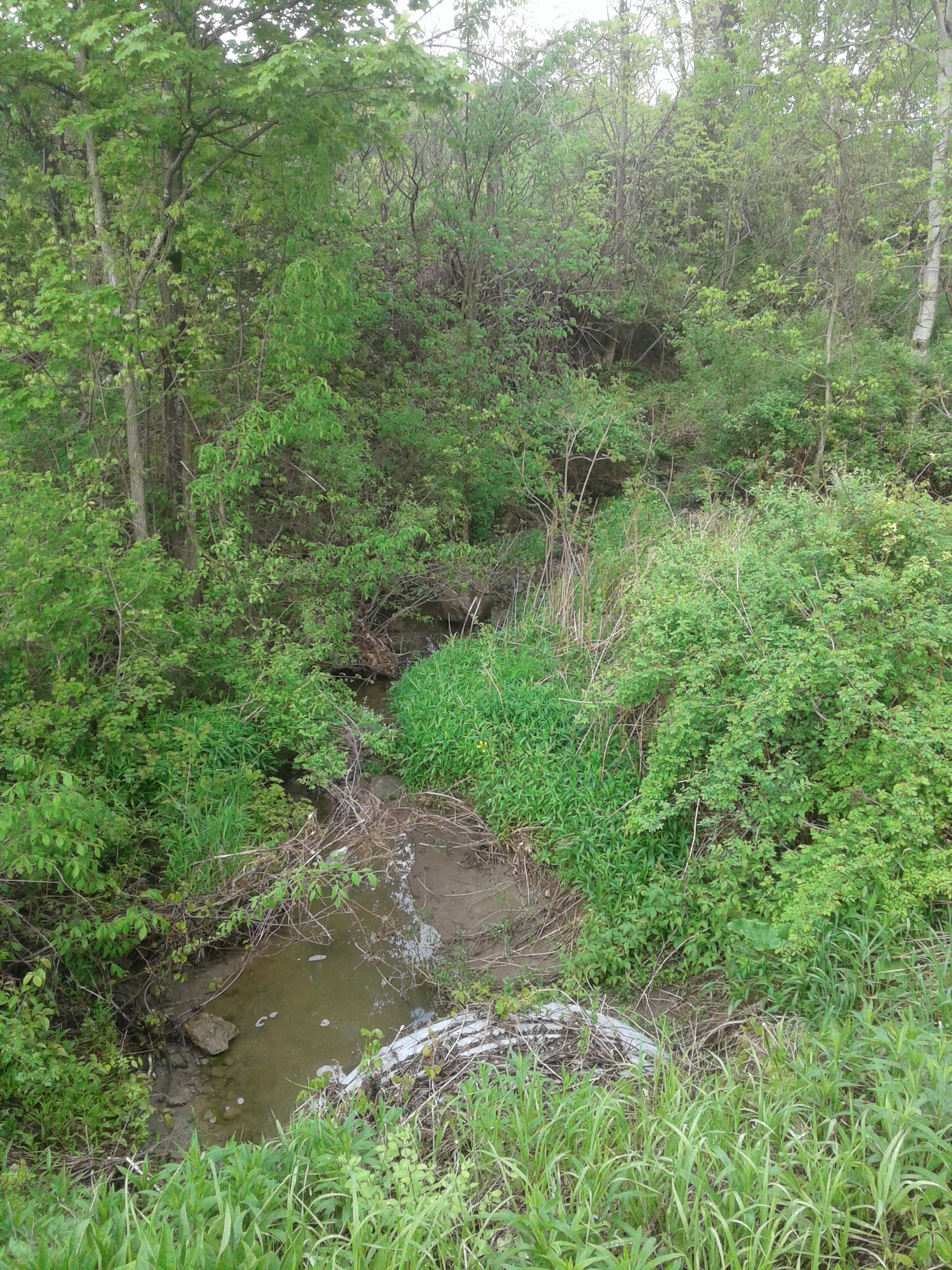
Bowmans Creek west of Hessville near the source

Bowmans Creek begins west of the hamlet of Hessville and starts flowing eastward.
