= Van Alstyne Homestead =

Historic house in New York, United States

- U.S. National Register of Historic Places
- U.S. Historic district – Contributing property
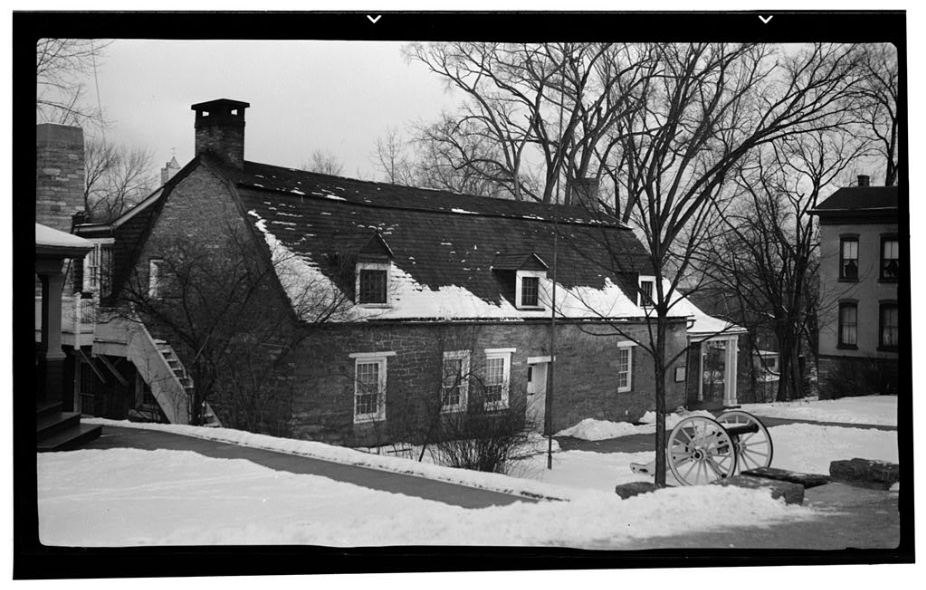
- "Van Alstyne Homestead"

- Location within New York Location within the United States
- Interactive map showing the location of Van Alystine House
- Location: 42 Moyer St., Canajoharie, New York
- Coordinates: 42°54′13″N 74°34′19″W
- Area: 0.2 acres (0.081 ha)
- Built: Pre 1730
- Architectural style: Colonial, Dutch Colonial
- NRHP reference No.: 83001711
- Added to NRHP: September 8, 1983

Van Alstyne Homestead is a historic home located at Canajoharie in Montgomery County, New York. It is a long, low rectangular house with a steeply pitched gambrel roof in the Dutch Colonial style. The original fieldstone house was built before 1730 and has three rooms (loft, living area, kitchen cellar) with a garret under the roof. A 2 1/2-story frame addition runs across the rear.

It was added to the National Register of Historic Places in 1983. It is located in the Canajoharie Historic District.

== Brief history ==
First constructed by Martin Janse Van Alstyne before 1730 the home also functioned as a tavern and meeting place with the start of the American Revolution. By 1775 it was owned by Goshen (Goose) Van Alstyne and was a frequent meeting place for the Tryon County Committee of Safety. It was here that the Mohawk Valley's patriots first debated the merits of liberty and the new American Tryon Militia was born. Nicholas Herkimer accepted his new commission here as Chief Colonel and was later appointed General of the all volunteer force of American frontier soldiers.

== Museum ==
The historic Dutch homestead and tavern houses the Rufus Grider collection of historically accurate drawings documenting 18th century homes, farms and life across the Mohawk Valley. Rufus Grider, a Moravian immigrant and late 19th century artist, purchased and renovated the old homestead in 1885 to create one of New York's first museums of its kind. Today it is run by the Van Alstyne Homestead Society and is open to the public for tours during the summer season on Saturdays.
