= United States Post Office (Canajoharie, New York) =

- US Post Office-Canajoharie
- U.S. National Register of Historic Places
- U.S. Historic district – Contributing property
- Location within New York Location within the United States
- Location: 50 W. Main St., Canajoharie, New York
- Coordinates: 42°54′23″N 74°33′41″W
- Area: less than one acre
- Built: 1937
- Architect: Simon, Louis A.; Shulkin, Anatol
- Architectural style: Colonial Revival
- MPS: US Post Offices in New York State, 1858-1943, TR
- NRHP reference No.: 88002464
- Added to NRHP: November 17, 1988

US Post Office-Canajoharie is a historic post office building located at Canajoharie in Montgomery County, New York, United States. It was built in 1937, and is one of a number of post offices in New York State designed by the Office of the Supervising Architect of the Treasury Department under Louis A. Simon. It is a one-story, symmetrical brick building on a stone watertable in the Colonial Revival style. It features a gable roof with a square, flat topped cupola with Doric order pilasters and round-arched vent openings. The interior features a 1942 mural by Anatol Shulkin (1899-1961) titled Invention of the Paper Bag in Canajoharie.

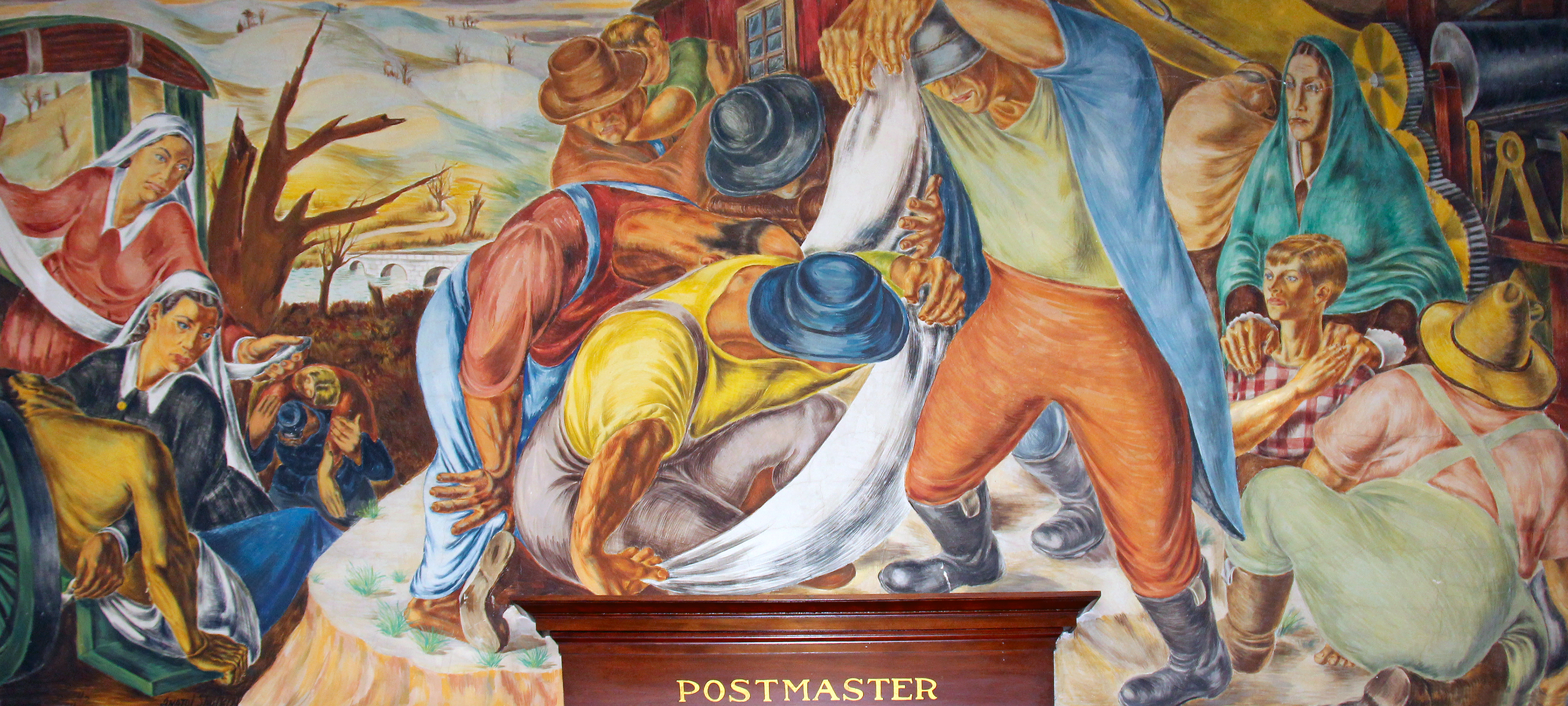
The historic post office building in Canajoharie, New York features a New Deal-funded Section of Fine Arts mural painted by Anatol Shulkin. Titled Invention of the Paper Bag in Canajoharie, the mural was installed in the post office lobby in 1942.

Both the Library and the mural are projects of the New Deal.

The building was listed on the National Register of Historic Places in 1988. It is located in the Canajoharie Historic District.
