= Minden, New York =

- Town
- Location in Montgomery County and the state of New York
- Coordinates: 42°55′51″N 74°40′26″W
- Country: United States
- State: New York
- County: Montgomery

Government
  - Type: Town Council
  - Town Supervisor: Cheryl Reese (R)
  - Town Council: Members' List: • Karolann Grimm (R); • Douglas R. Simmons (R); • Janice L. Zoller (R); • Stephen R. Heiser (R)

Area
  - Total: 51.44 sq mi (133.22 km^{2})
  - Land: 51.00 sq mi (132.08 km^{2})
  - Water: 0.44 sq mi (1.14 km^{2})
- Elevation: 531 ft (162 m)

Population (2020)
  - Total: 4,166
  - Density: 81.7/sq mi (31.5/km^{2})
- Time zone: UTC-5 (Eastern (EST))
  - Summer (DST): UTC-4 (EDT)
- ZIP Code: 13339 (Fort Plain)
- Area code: 518
- FIPS code: 36-057-47614
- GNIS feature ID: 0979223
- Website: www.townofmindenny.gov

Minden is a town in Montgomery County, New York, United States. The population was 4,166 at the 2020 census. The town is located at the western edge of the county and south of the Mohawk River, which forms its northern border. It possessed a post office from 1802 to 1903. It is also believed to be the namesake of the town of Minden, Louisiana.

== History ==
The area was first settled by Europeans around 1748. It was probably named after Minden in Germany. Among the early European settlers in the 18th century were Palatine Germans; these Protestants had come to New York as refugees from religious warfare. Their passage was paid by Queen Anne's government in exchange for their work at camps along the Hudson River, producing naval stores for England.

During the American Revolution, rebel colonists constructed a small fort in 1778 at Fort Plain village. In 1780, the village was attacked by Tories and allied natives. They burned and sacked the community, but were not able to overcome the defenders at the fort.

Following the war, the town of Minden was formed in 1798 from the town of Canajoharie. It was part of a rural area that was important for agriculture and dairy farming.

In 1985, a former farm in Minden was found to be the site of a cocaine processing lab set up at a former dairy farm by the Cali cartel based in Colombia. The drug lab was shut down following a state police and federal investigation of an explosion at the site, and the U.S. Marshals Service took control of the property.

== Geography ==
Minden is in western Montgomery County, bordered to the north and northeast by the Mohawk River/Erie Canal, to the west by Herkimer County, to the south by Otsego County, and to the southeast by the town of Canajoharie. The village of Fort Plain is in the eastern corner of Minden, next to the Mohawk River.

The New York State Thruway (Interstate 90) follows the course of the Mohawk River across the northern part of the town. The closest access points are Exit 29 to the east at Canajoharie village and Exit 29A to the west serving Little Falls. New York State Route 5S crosses the town, leading northwest 17 miles (27 km) to Mohawk village and southeast through Fort Plain to Canajoharie. State Route 80 cross the center of the town, leading southwest to U.S. Route 20 in Springfield and leading east through Fort Plain and across the Mohawk River to end at Nelliston.

According to the U.S. Census Bureau, the town of Minden has a total area of 51.4 square miles (133 km^{2}), of which 51.0 square miles (132 km^{2}) are land and 0.4 square miles (1.0 km^{2}), or 0.86%, are water. Most of the town is drained by Otsquago Creek, which flows east across the center of town and joins the Mohawk River at Fort Plain. The southern end of town is drained by Bowmans Creek, a tributary of Canajoharie Creek which joins the Mohawk at Canajoharie village.

== Demographics ==
Historical population
Census	Pop.	Note	%±
1820	1,954		—
1830	2,567		31.4%
1840	2,507		−2.3%
1850	4,623		84.4%
1860	4,412		−4.6%
1870	4,600		4.3%
1880	5,100		10.9%
1890	5,198		1.9%
1900	4,541		−12.6%
1910	4,645		2.3%
1920	4,366		−6.0%
1930	4,232		−3.1%
1940	4,376		3.4%
1950	4,656		6.4%
1960	4,560		−2.1%
1970	4,691		2.9%
1980	4,743		1.1%
1990	4,474		−5.7%
2000	4,202		−6.1%
2010	4,297		2.3%
2020	4,166		−3.0%
U.S. Decennial Census

As of the census of 2000, there were 4,202 people, 1,685 households, and 1,142 families residing in the town. The population density was 82.3 inhabitants per square mile (31.8/km^{2}). There were 1,902 housing units at an average density of 37.3 per square mile (14.4/km^{2}). The racial makeup of the town was 98.57% White, 0.10% African American, 0.19% Native American, 0.43% Asian, 0.29% from other races, and 0.43% from two or more races. Hispanic or Latino of any race were 1.33% of the population.

There were 1,685 households, out of which 30.4% had children under the age of 18 living with them, 51.8% were married couples living together, 9.9% had a female householder with no husband present, and 32.2% were non-families. 26.6% of all households were made up of individuals, and 15.1% had someone living alone who was 65 years of age or older. The average household size was 2.48 and the average family size was 2.98.

In the town, the population was spread out, with 25.3% under the age of 18, 7.7% from 18 to 24, 25.6% from 25 to 44, 23.8% from 45 to 64, and 17.6% who were 65 years of age or older. The median age was 39 years. For every 100 females, there were 95.7 males. For every 100 females age 18 and over, there were 91.6 males.

The median income for a household in the town was $28,333, and the median income for a family was $33,654. Males had a median income of $27,813 versus $21,437 for females. The per capita income for the town was $15,099. About 9.0% of families and 12.0% of the population were below the poverty line, including 13.9% of those under age 18 and 9.1% of those age 65 or over.

== Communities and locations in Minden ==
- Brookman Corners – A hamlet in the northwestern part of the town.
- Charlesworth Corners – A hamlet northwest of Fort Plain.
- Freysbush – A hamlet southwest of Fort Plain village.
- Fordsbush – A hamlet by the western town line.
- Fort Plain – A village in the eastern corner of the town, on Otsquago Creek, south of the Mohawk River.
- Hallsville – A location west of Fort Plain.
- Hessville – A hamlet in the southeastern corner of the town on Route 163.
- Keesler Corners – A hamlet southwest of Fort Plain village.
- Mindenville – A hamlet at the northern town boundary by the Mohawk River.
- Moyers Corners – A location south of Mindenville.
- Ripple Brook – A location in the southwestern part of the town.
- Salt Springville – A hamlet straddling the southern town line.
- Sand Hill – A hamlet northwest of Fort Plain village.
- Valley Brook – A hamlet west of Fort Plain village on Route 80.
- Willse Hill – An elevation in the southwestern corner of the town; partially located in the Towns of Stark and Springfield.
