= Marcy H. Randall =

American politician

Member of the Washington House of Representatives
- In office 1889–1891

Personal details
- Born: c. 1842 Ames, New York, United States
- Party: Republican

Marcy Henry Randall (born c. 1842, date of death not found) was an American politician in the state of Washington. He served in the Washington House of Representatives from 1889 to 1891.
