= Hessville =

Hessville may refer to:

- Hessville, Indiana, a neighborhood in Hammond, Indiana
- Hessville, New York, a hamlet in Montgomery County, New York
- Hessville, Ohio, an unincorporated community in Sandusky County, New York
