= West Hill School (New York) =

- U.S. National Register of Historic Places
- U.S. Historic district – Contributing property
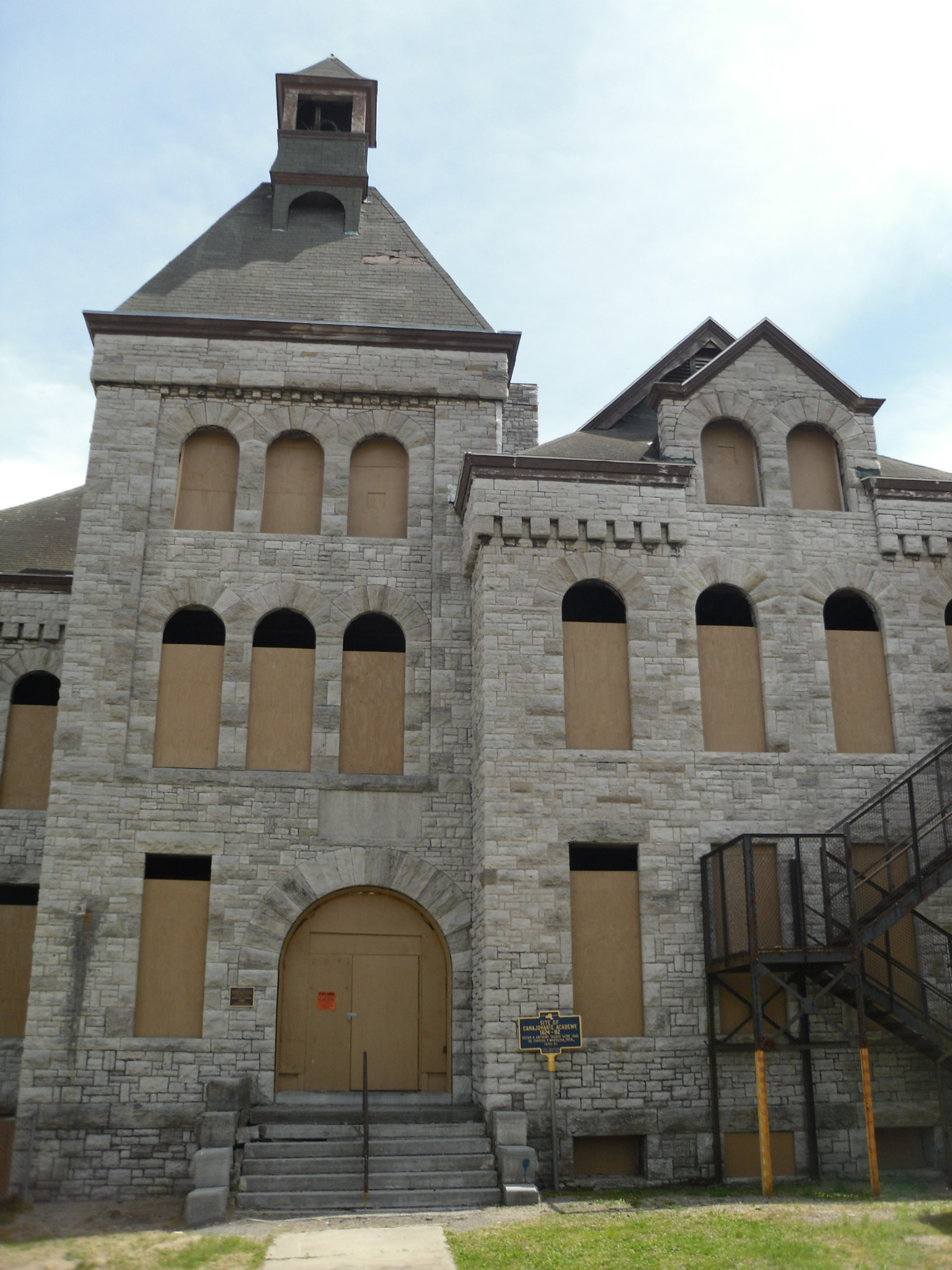
- West Hill School, April 2010

- Location within New York Location within the United States
- Location: 3 Otsego St., Canajoharie, New York
- Coordinates: 42°54′17″N 74°34′25″W
- Area: 0.4 acres (0.16 ha)
- Built: 1891
- Architect: Russell, Archimedes
- Architectural style: Romanesque
- NRHP reference No.: 02000359
- Added to NRHP: April 11, 2002

West Hill School is a historic school building located at Canajoharie, Montgomery County, New York. It was designed by prominent local architect Archimedes Russell (1840–1915) and built 1891–1893. It is a 3 1/2-story, stone masonry institutional building. It features a stone tower with open belfry containing the original school bell. It continued in educational use for over 100 years. It was constructed on the site of the Canajoharie Academy, where in 1846, Susan B. Anthony began a teaching position as head of the girls division.

It was added to the National Register of Historic Places in 2002. It is located in the Canajoharie Historic District.
