= Canajoharie Historic District =

Historic district in New York, United States

- U.S. National Register of Historic Places
- U.S. Historic district
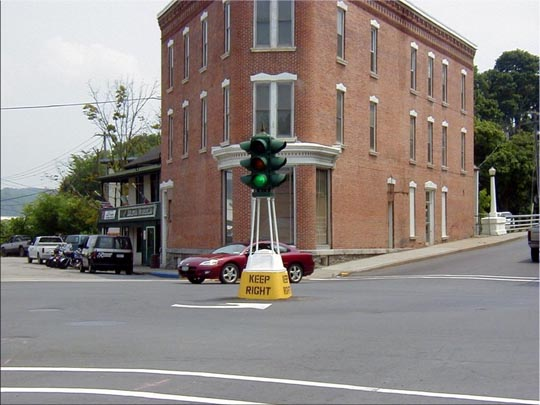
- Canajoharie Dummy Light, September 2008

- Location within New York Location within the United States
- Location: Roughly Church, Cliff, E. & W. Main, Mill, Moyer, Rock & Reed Sts., Erie Blvd., Canajoharie, New York
- Coordinates: 42°54′11″N 74°34′16″W
- Area: 419.79 acres (169.88 ha)
- Built: c. 1750-1959
- Architectural style: Greek Revival, Italianate, Queen Anne, Second Empire, Colonial Revival, Tudor Revival, Bungalow/Craftsman
- NRHP reference No.: 15000233
- Added to NRHP: May 18, 2015

Canajoharie Historic District is a national historic district located at Canajoharie in Montgomery County, New York. It encompasses 836 contributing buildings, 4 contributing sites, 11 contributing structures, and 19 contributing objects in the central business district and surrounding residential sections of the village of Canajoharie. It developed between about 1750 and 1959, and includes notable examples of Greek Revival, Italianate, Queen Anne, Second Empire, Colonial Revival, Tudor Revival, and Bungalow / American Craftsman style architecture. Located in the district are the separately listed Bragdon-Lipe House, the Van Alstyne House, the West Hill School, and the United States Post Office. Other notable contributing resources include the Village Hall (1941), Canajoharie Creamery (C. 1900), Beech-Nut No. 1 Plant, Beech-Nut No. 2 Plant, Reformed church (1842), Episcopal Church of the Good Shepherd (1874), St. Mark's Lutheran Church (1868), Saints Peter and Paul Roman Catholic church (1862, 1890s), Sayles Building (1868), and the Arkell Foundation complex (c. 1910).

It was added to the National Register of Historic Places in 2015.
