= Bragdon-Lipe House =

Historic house in New York, United States

- U.S. National Register of Historic Places
- U.S. Historic district – Contributing property
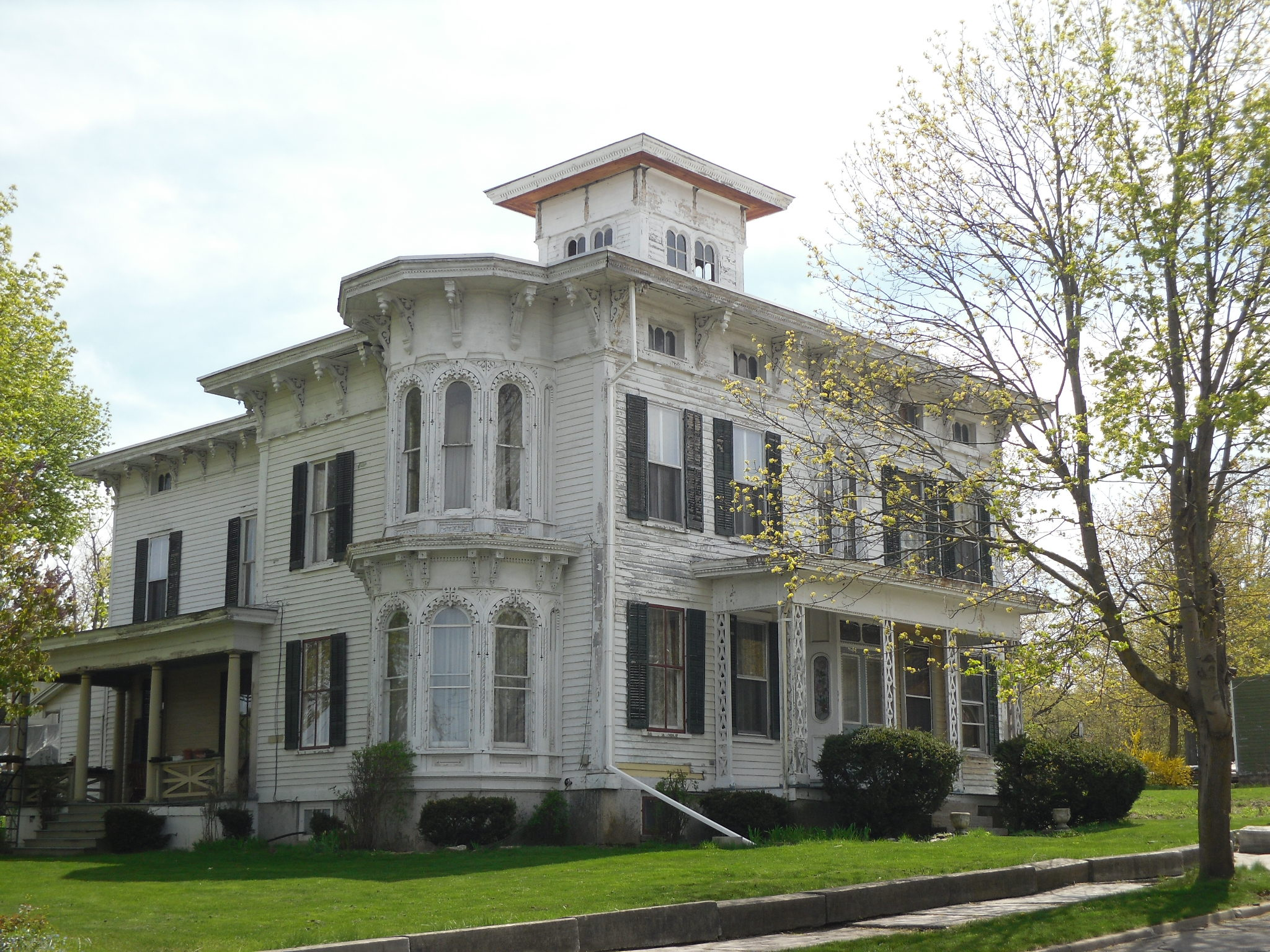
- Bragdon-Lipe House, April 2010

- Location within New York Location within the United States
- Location: 17 Otsego St., Canajoharie, New York
- Coordinates: 42°54′14″N 74°34′28″W
- Area: less than one acre
- Built: 1860
- Architectural style: Italianate
- NRHP reference No.: 05001123
- Added to NRHP: October 5, 2005

Bragdon-Lipe House is a historic home located at Canajoharie in Montgomery County, New York. It was built about 1860 and is a two-story, timber-frame vernacular Italianate style residence. The main block is nearly square and has a two-story kitchen and service wing in the rear. It features an ornate two-story, polygonal wall bay and an enclosed square belevedere at the center of the roof. Also on the property is a carriage barn dated to about 1870.

It was added to the National Register of Historic Places in 2005. It is located in the Canajoharie Historic District.
