= Justice Randall =

Justice Randall may refer to:

- Edwin M. Randall (1822–1895), chief justice of the Florida Supreme Court
- Jonathan Randall (Rhode Island) (1706–1791), associate justice of the Colonial Rhode Island Supreme Court
- Samuel Randall (Rhode Island) (1778–1864), associate justice of the Rhode Island Supreme Court
