= Oscar Kahler =

American politician

- Born: March 1871; Minden, New York
- Died: 12 March 1954 (aged 83); Big Flats, New York
- Occupations: Farmer & Politician
- Spouse: Mary Lowe (m.1896)
- Children: Harry, Herbert, Martin & George Kahler
- Parent(s): George & Rosina (Keesler) Kahler

Oscar Kahler was a New York State Assemblyman from Chemung County. Kahler was President of the Chemung County Farm Bureau Association in 1915. In 1954, the Assembly of the State of New York adjourned early out of respect to his memory.

== Biography ==
Oscar Kahler was born in March 1871 in Minden, Montgomery County, New York on the farm of his grandmother, Elizabeth Keesler. His parents, George and Rosina moved to Cherry Valley, New York in 1874 but left soon after settling and finally purchased land in Big Flats, New York. On this land, once owned by Andrew Bennett, stood a small farm house. The family lived in this farm house for a while until a larger and nicer home could be built across the road. In about 1880 the new home was completed and the old farm house was used as a boarding house.
