= Edwin M. Randall =

American judge

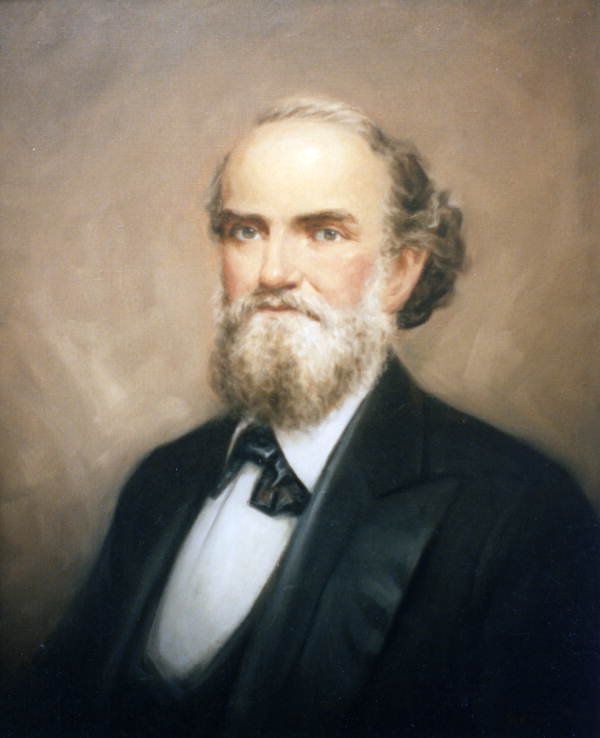
Painted portrait of Florida Supreme Court Justice Edwin M. Randall (circa 1868)

Edwin M. Randall (April 5, 1822 – July 12, 1895) was a Florida lawyer and Republican politician who served as chief justice of the Florida Supreme Court from January 1869 to January 7, 1885.

Randall was born in Canajoharie, New York in Montgomery County, New York on April 5, 1822. His father, Phineas, was a lawyer and a judge. He attended the public schools. After reading law under his father, he was admitted to the bar in 1844. In 1845 the family moved to Waukesha, Wisconsin where he joined his brother, Alexander's, legal practice. In 1847 he married Julia Mills in Milwaukee, Wisconsin. For the next ten years he worked to build the law practice. He became friends with Harrison Reed, then a Madison of newspaper editor. In 1858, Alexander became governor of Wisconsin.

His brother's political career furthered Randall's. In 1864, a year after Alexander's appointment as assistant Postmaster General, Randall was appointed federal tax commissioner for Louisiana. After becoming Postmaster General under President Andrew Johnson, his brother sent Randall to Florida to help Harrison Reed, who was then Florida's postal agent.

Randall and Reed became ready partners. The Republican Party in Florida was factionalized at that time, and their efforts at the 1868 Florida Constitutional Convention derailed the efforts of the "Mule Team," and furthered the efforts of their more conservative faction. As a result, Reed was elected governor and appointed Randall Chief Justice of the Florida Supreme Court.

Randall served as chief justice during a turbulent time for Florida and the Court. Reconstruction brought division and conflict to Florida and to factions within the Republican Party. He became chief interpreter of the Constitution of 1868. In 1872, he presided over Reed's impeachment. The disputed presidential and gubernatorial elections of 1876 presented unprecedented challenges. Despite Randall's personal and political affiliations, the Court ordered a recount and awarded the governorship to Democrat George F. Drew.

On January 7, 1885 Randall returned to private practice in Jacksonville, after the election of Democrat Edward A. Perry as governor. He was one of Duval County's delegates to the state constitutional convention. He served briefly in the early 1890s as Jacksonville city attorney. On July 12, 1895, he died of Bright's disease.

His Great Great Great Grandson is Mark Andrew Reynolds
