= Ames Academy Building =

- U.S. National Register of Historic Places
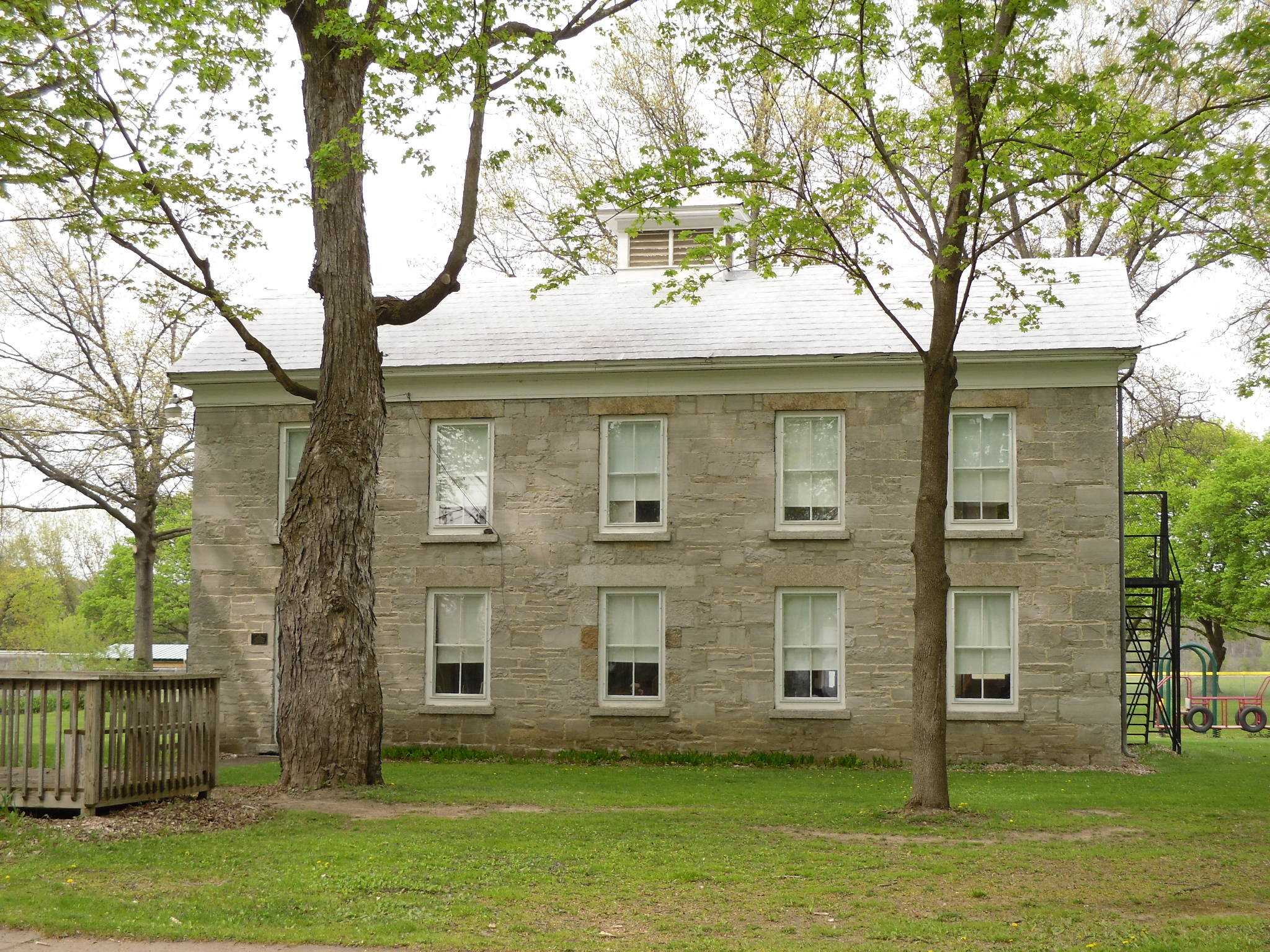
- Ames Academy Building, May 2010

- Location within New York Location within the United States
- Location: 611 Latimer Hill Rd., Ames, New York
- Coordinates: 42°50′13″N 74°36′0″W
- Area: 2.2 acres (0.89 ha)
- Built: 1835
- Architectural style: Federal
- NRHP reference No.: 01001496
- Added to NRHP: January 24, 2002

Ames Academy Building is a historic school building located at Ames, Montgomery County, New York. It was built in 1835 and is a two-story, rectangular, gable roofed, stone masonry building five bays long and two bays wide. The walls are constructed of cut limestone blocks. The Ames Academy received a charter from the New York State Board of Regents on February 5, 1839. It was used as a school until 1959. Since 1987 it has housed a local history museum.

It was added to the National Register of Historic Places in 2002.
