= Judds Falls =

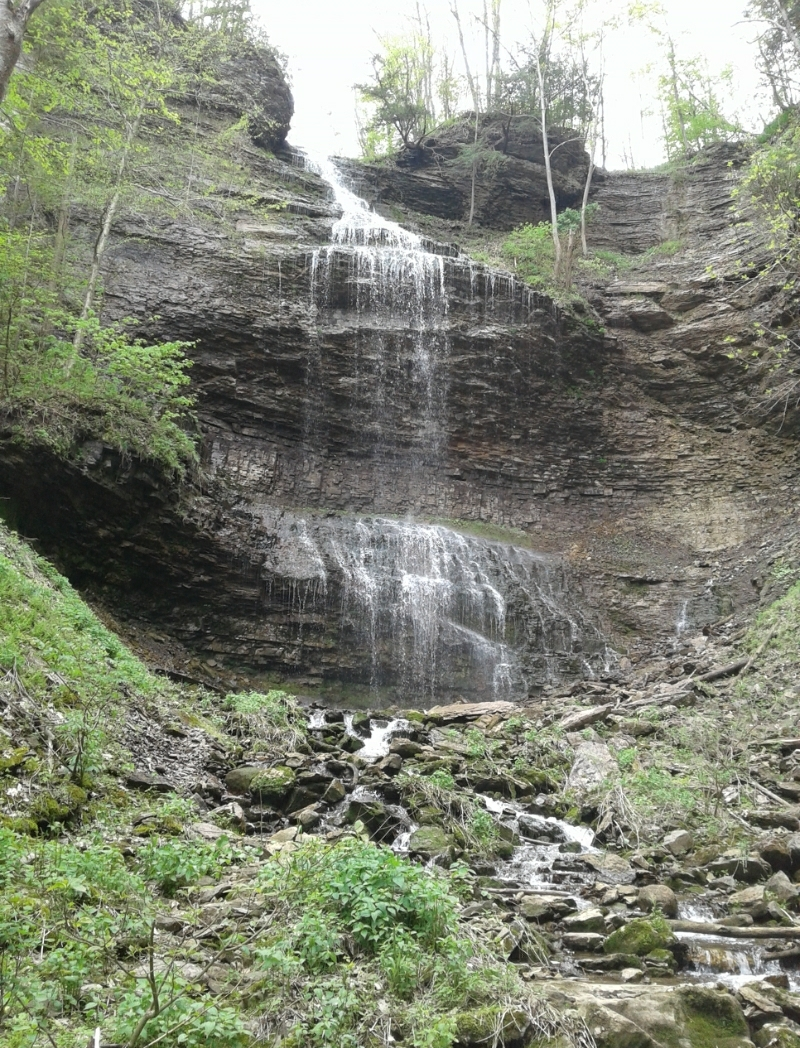
- Judds Falls in May 2019

- Location within New York
- Coordinates: 42°49′21″N 74°41′12″W
- Elevation: 1,207 ft (368 m)
- Watercourse: Canajoharie Creek

Judds Falls, also known as Tekaharawa Falls, is a waterfall located northeast of the Village of Cherry Valley, New York on the Canajoharie Creek.

== See also ==
- List of waterfalls
