= Amy Vedder =

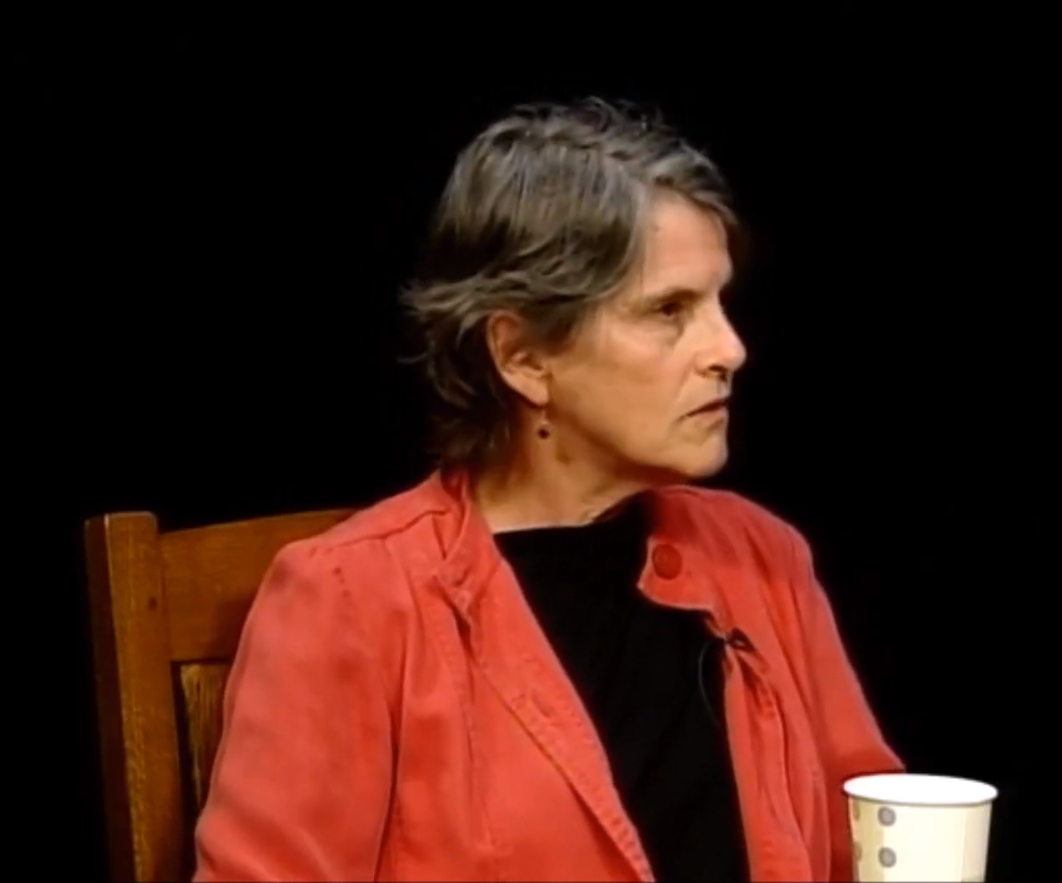
Amy Vedder

Amy Vedder (born March 24, 1951, in Palatine Bridge, New York) is an ecologist and primatologist involved in conservation work with mountain gorillas.

== Biography ==
Vedder was the Class of 1969 valedictorian at Canajoharie High School, Canajoharie, New York, and a 1973 graduate of Swarthmore College.

Vedder worked in Africa for the Peace Corps from 1973 to 1975. There she and her husband William Weber (Bill) worked in a small boarding school in rural south central Zaire. She taught the girls there by reminding them "You're special -- don't ever forget that". One day they asked her why she changed her name to her husband's if she believed everyone was special. She then decided to change her last name from Weber back to Vedder upon returning to the United States. Her time in Zaire inspired her interest in wildlife conservation. This feeling intensified at Zaire's Kahuzi-Biega National Park where she observed Casimir, an enormous male eastern lowland gorilla. This encounter made her want to work with wildlife in Africa after the Peace Corps.

After getting a doctorate at the University of Wisconsin–Madison in 1989, she became Biodiversity Coordinator for the Wildlife Conservation Society, and later director of the conservation of the society's Africa Program. Vedder also served as the senior technical advisor for the GEF/UNDP, and joined The Wilderness Society to serve as their senior vice president.

One of Vedder's contributions was to implement the Mountain Gorilla Project (subsequently the International Gorilla Conservation Programme (IGCP)), which sought to involve local Rwandans and use ecotourism to help conserve the gorillas.

Vedder has also written extensively on the future of conservation, as the field negotiates differing goals and objectives for conservation.

== Bibliography ==
- Vedder, Amy & Weber, William (2001). In the Kingdom of Gorillas: Fragile Species in a Dangerous Land. Simon & Schuster. ISBN 978-0-7432-0006-6.
- Nienaber, Georgianne (2006). Gorilla Dreams: The Legacy of Dian Fossey. iUniverse, Inc. ISBN 978-0-595-37669-8.
- Vedder, Amy (2006). Gorilla Mountain The Story of Wildlife Biologist Amy Vedder. National Academies Press. ISBN 978-0-309-09551-8.
