= Canajoharie Central School District =

School district in New York, United States

Address
- 136 Scholastic Way Canajoharie, New York, 13317; United States

District information
- Type: Public
- Grades: PreK–12
- NCES District ID: 3606300

Students and staff
- Students: 864 (2020–2021)
- Teachers: 76.83 (on an FTE basis)
- Staff: 62.04 (on an FTE basis)
- Student–teacher ratio: 11.25:1

Other information
- Website: www.canajoharieschools.org

Canajoharie Central School District is a school district in Canajoharie, New York. It includes a high school, a middle school, and an elementary school.

The music department of Canajoharie High School and Elementary school (Canajoharie, NY) was honored with an award by the Grammy Foundation in 2005. The music department has many different groups including a concert band, jazz band, orchestras, choirs and many smaller groups such as the flute ensemble. The high school music department takes a trip every two years to places such as Philadelphia and Washington, DC.

Canajoharie music department was presented with a Grammy Foundation Signature Enterprise School Award on July 2, 2005,. The $20,000 award honors U.S. public high school music programs.
