= Freysbush, New York =

- Hamlet
- Location within New York Location within the United States
- Coordinates: 42°54′33″N 74°39′47″W
- Country: United States
- State: New York
- Region: Central New York Region
- County: Montgomery
- Town: Minden
- Elevation: 690 ft (210 m)
- Time zone: UTC-5 (Eastern (EST))
  - Summer (DST): UTC-4 (EDT)
- Area code: 518

Freysbush, also known as Frey's Bush, is a hamlet in the town of Minden in Montgomery County, New York, United States.
