= Canajoharie, New York =

- Town
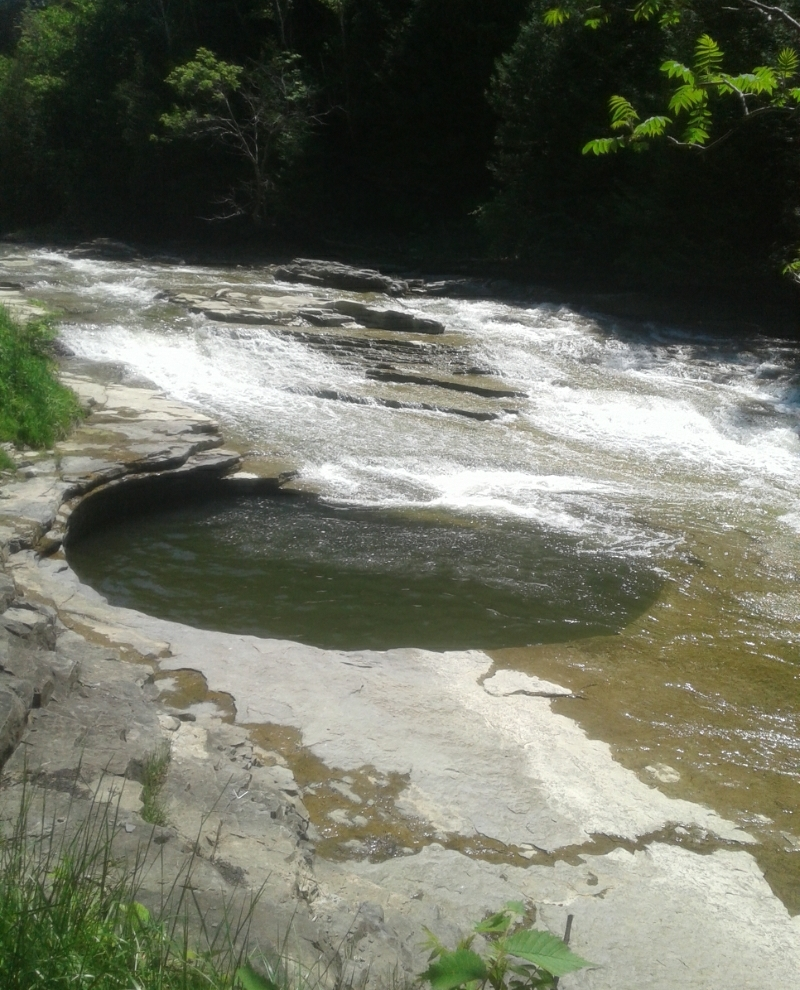
- The "pot that washes itself", also known as Foley's Water Spout, is a pothole located just south of the village of Canajoharie on Canajoharie Creek.

- Location within Montgomery County and the state of New York
- Coordinates: 42°54′22″N 74°34′19″W
- Country: United States
- State: New York
- County: Montgomery

Government
  - Type: Town Council
  - Mayor: Austin Countryman (R)
  - Town council: Members: • Arthur Ulman; • Darryl Easton; • Michael Ehrenreich. (R); • Raymond Kiefl

Area
  - Total: 43.10 sq mi (111.63 km^{2})
  - Land: 42.60 sq mi (110.34 km^{2})
  - Water: 0.50 sq mi (1.29 km^{2})

Population (2020)
  - Total: 3,660
  - Density: 85.9/sq mi (33.2/km^{2})
- Time zone: UTC-5 (Eastern (EST))
  - Summer (DST): UTC-4 (EDT)
- ZIP Codes: 13317 (Canajoharie); 12166 (Sprakers); 13339 (Fort Plain); 13459 (Sharon Springs)
- FIPS code: 36-057-12122

Canajoharie (/ˌkænədʒəˈhɛəri/) is a town in Montgomery County, New York, United States. The population was 3,660 as of the 2020 census. Canajoharie is located south of the Mohawk River on the southern border of the county. The Erie Canal passes along the northern town line. The village of Canajoharie is in the northern part of the town. Both are east of Utica and west of Amsterdam.

== History ==
The town is near the former site of Canajoharie (Mohawk: Kana’tsioharé:ke), an important village of the Mohawk nation that also became known as the Upper Castle. The Mohawk had as their territory most of the central area of present-day New York, from the Hudson River west to where Oneida territory started. They dominated the fur trade with the French based in central Quebec, and with Dutch and later English in eastern New York. French, Dutch and later English trappers and traders came to this Mohawk village to trade. Both the French and Dutch married or had unions with Mohawk women, increasing their ties with the people. Their mixed-race children married into the Dutch and later English communities. Many of their sons also became interpreters or traders.

Anglo-Europeans began settling in the area c.1737, and the Mohawk gradually adopted certain English customs in their village. Because the Mohawk and three other Iroquois nations were allied with the British during the Revolutionary War, they were forced to cede most of their lands in New York after the United States' victory. The state sold millions of acres of land to speculators and private owners.

After the Revolutionary War, George Washington visited Canajoharie after surveying the damage to nearby Cherry Valley. He stayed the night at the Van Alstyne home, a common meeting place long referred to by some as Fort Rensselaer - though the actual fort (destroyed sometime before the French and Indian War) was in nearby Fort Plain.

The modern town was formed in 1788, but was reduced in size to create the towns of Minden (1797) and Root (in part, 1822). While the Mohawk Valley developed with the completion of the Erie Canal, the project also enabled considerable migration from New York to the Midwest. The population of the town in 1865 was 4,248.

One of the first bridges to span the Mohawk River was built between Canajoharie and Palatine Bridge, in 1802. It was a single uncovered wooden arch 330 feet long, and collapsed in 1807. A new one built from the same lumber was built in 1808, this time a covered bridge resting on 3 stone piers. This bridge was swept away by a flood in 1822 and was replaced the same year, but was lost to another flood and replaced in 1833.

The town of Canajoharie was consumed by fire twice, causing an ordinance to be passed prohibiting homes to be constructed of wood. Therefore, many of the older homes in the town are made of brick or locally quarried stone.

Beech-Nut, the baby food producer, was founded in Canajoharie in 1890 during the period of early industrialization in the river valley. It served as the largest employer in the town for more than a century. In March 2011, the Beech-Nut factory moved out of Canajoharie, relocating to a new factory in the nearby town of Florida, still in Montgomery County.

== Geography ==
Canajoharie is in western Montgomery County and is bordered to the south by Otsego and Schoharie counties. The northern town boundary follows the Mohawk River. The Erie Canal is part of the river in this area. According to the U.S. Census Bureau, the town has a total area of 43.1 square miles (112 km^{2}), of which 42.6 square miles (110 km^{2}) are land and 0.5 square miles (1.3 km^{2}), or 1.16%, are water. Canajoharie Creek drains most of the town, flowing north and dropping over several waterfalls, including Canajoharie Falls, to join the Mohawk River at Canajoharie village.

The New York State Thruway crosses the northern part of the town, following the river, and with access to the village from Exit 29. The Thruway leads east 50 miles (80 km) to Albany, the state capital, and west 40 miles (64 km) to Utica. New York State Route 5S parallels the Thruway, leading east 12 miles (19 km) to Fultonville and west 3.5 miles (5.6 km) to Fort Plain. New York State Route 10 is a north–south highway, intersecting the Thruway and NY-5S at Canajoharie village. NY-10 leads north 8 miles (13 km) to Ephratah, continuing on into the Adirondacks, and south 9 miles (14 km) to Sharon Springs.

== Demographics ==
Historical population
Census	Pop.	Note	%±
1820	4,677		—
1830	4,348		−7.0%
1840	5,146		18.4%
1850	4,097		−20.4%
1860	4,134		0.9%
1870	4,256		3.0%
1880	4,294		0.9%
1890	4,267		−0.6%
1900	3,838		−10.1%
1910	3,889		1.3%
1920	3,784		−2.7%
1930	4,023		6.3%
1940	4,062		1.0%
1950	4,294		5.7%
1960	4,233		−1.4%
1970	4,319		2.0%
1980	4,140		−4.1%
1990	3,909		−5.6%
2000	3,797		−2.9%
2010	3,730		−1.8%
2020	3,660		−1.9%
U.S. Decennial Census

As of the census of 2000, there were 3,797 people, 1,492 households, and 1,026 families residing in the town. The population density was 88.5 inhabitants per square mile (34.2/km^{2}). There were 1,637 housing units at an average density of 38.2 units per square mile (14.7 units/km^{2}). The racial makeup of the town was 97.02% White, 0.63% Black or African American, 0.40% Native American, 0.50% Asian, 0.32% from other races, and 1.13% from two or more races. Hispanic or Latino of any race were 1.13% of the population.

There were 1,492 households, out of which 33.2% had children under the age of 18 living with them, 53.0% were married couples living together, 11.3% had a female householder with no husband present, and 31.2% were non-families. 26.1% of all households were made up of individuals, and 12.2% had someone living alone who was 65 years of age or older. The average household size was 2.52 and the average family size was 3.00.

In the town, the population was spread out, with 26.3% under the age of 18, 7.5% from 18 to 24, 25.8% from 25 to 44, 23.7% from 45 to 64, and 16.8% who were 65 years of age or older. The median age was 39 years. For every 100 females, there were 94.1 males. For every 100 females age 18 and over, there were 91.0 males.

The median income for a household in the town was $31,701, and the median income for a family was $39,646. Males had a median income of $29,107 versus $22,617 for females. The per capita income for the town was $16,702. About 11.0% of families and 11.3% of the population were below the poverty line, including 17.8% of those under age 18 and 3.3% of those age 65 or over.

The town’s current population of 3,660 (according to the 2020 US Census) is the lowest in its recorded history (dating back to 1820).

== Communities and locations in the town ==
- Ames – A village in the southern section of the town on NY-10.
- Bowmans Creek – A stream in the southern part of the town.
- Budd Hill – A location at the southern town line, south of Ames.
- Buel – A hamlet in the southwestern section of the town, on Canajoharie Creek. The community and much of the southern part of Canajoharie were once called Bowmans Creek, after early settler Jacob Bowman.
- Canajoharie – A village in the northern part of the town, on the Mohawk River and NY-10.
- Canajoharie Creek – A stream in the south central part of the town.
- Canajoharie Falls – A waterfall located south of the village of Canajoharie.
- Fort Plain – A village that is partly in the town at the western town line.
- Maple Hill – A landform east of Marshville.
- Mapletown – A location near the eastern town line, named after local trees.
- Marshville – A hamlet south of Canajoharie village on NY-10.
- Sprout Brook – A hamlet in the southwestern part of the town, on Bowmans Creek.
- Van Deusenville – A hamlet near the town line in the southwestern section of the town.
- Waterville – A hamlet northeast of Ames.

== Notable people ==
- Susan B. Anthony, women's rights pioneer; taught school here
- Levi S. Backus (1803–1869), Deaf teacher and newspaper editor
- Frank Barbour, football player, coach, and businessman
- Joseph Brant (1743–1807), Mohawk chief
- Molly Brant (1736–1796), Mohawk leader
- Thomas Burdick, leader in early Latter Day Saint movement, Mormon pioneer, politician in California
- Chad Michael Collins (b. 1979), actor
- Alfred Conkling, lawyer, statesman, and jurist
- Frederick Conkling, son of Alfred Conkling and brother of Roscoe Conkling; became congressman for state of New York
- Josiah Failing, 4th mayor of Portland, Oregon; gained wealth as entrepreneur through general merchandise
- Bernhard Gillam, political cartoonist; died of typhoid in Canajoharie
- Myron Grimshaw, Major League Baseball player; right fielder for Boston Red Sox 1905–1907
- Chester "Bromley" Hoke (1847–1913), American veteran of the American Civil War
- Dan Hunt, football head coach, Colgate University
- Thomas James, former slave of Asa Kimball who became minister in upstate New York
- John Keyes, first Adjutant General of Connecticut
- Jacob Klock, colonel of 2nd regiment of Tryon County militia during Revolutionary War
- James Knox, congressman from Illinois
- Mary Anne Krupsak, lawyer and politician, lieutenant governor of New York 1975–78
- Sean MacFarland, lieutenant general in the Army
- Charles McVean, congressman; while in Canajoharie, was editor of town's newspaper
- George A. Mitchell, founder of Cadillac, Michigan
- Ots-Toch, 17th century Mohawk woman from Canajoharie who married Dutch trader Cornelius Anthonisse Van Slyck, founding Van Slyck family in New Netherland
- Hendrick Theyanoguin (1692–1755), Mohawk leader
- Benjamin Van Alstyne, head coach of Michigan State University basketball team 1927–1949
- Amy Vedder, ecologist and primatologist involved in conservation work with mountain gorillas
- Rebecca Winters, Mormon pioneer

== In popular culture ==
- They Might Be Giants titled a song "Canajoharie" on their 2011 album Join Us.
- Canajoharie is the title of a melancholic, pop-inspired piano piece on the album Mia Brentano's Hidden Sea: 20 Songs for 2 Pianos by Benyamin Nuss & Max Nyberg (2018).
