= Canajoharie Creek =

Watercourse in New York, United States

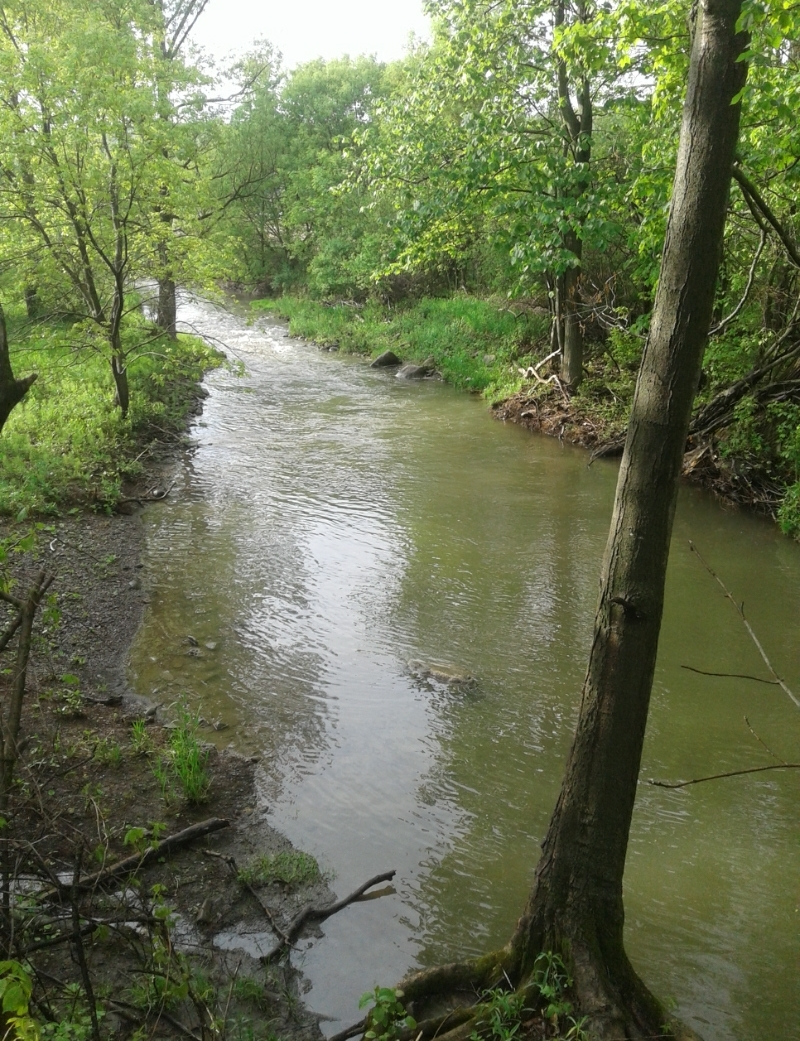
- Canajoharie Creek by Mill Road southwest of the hamlet of Sprout Brook

- Location of the mouth within New York Canajoharie Creek (the United States)

Location
- Country: United States
- State: New York
- Region: Central New York
- Counties: Otsego, Montgomery
- Towns: Cherry Valley, Canajoharie

Physical characteristics
- Source
  - location: N of Cherry Valley, New York
  - coordinates: 42°48′38″N 74°44′34″W
- Mouth: Mohawk River
  - location: Canajoharie, New York
  - coordinates: 42°54′32″N 74°34′11″W
  - elevation: 285 ft (87 m)
- Basin size: 69.22 sq mi (179.3 km^{2})

Basin features
- Tributaries
  - left: Takaharawa Brook, Bowmans Creek
  - right: Van Deusen Brook, Tri County Creek, Brimstone Creek
- Waterfalls: Judds Falls, Canajoharie Falls

The Canajoharie Creek (/ˌkænədʒəˈhɛəri/) is a river that flows into the Mohawk River in the Village of Canajoharie in the U.S. State of New York. The name "Canajoharie" is a Mohawk language term meaning "the pot that washes itself", referring to the "Canajoharie Boiling Pot", a 20-foot (6.1 m) wide and 10-foot (3.0 m) deep pothole in the Canajoharie Creek, just south of the village of Canajoharie. Bowmans Creek is one main tributary that enters the creek east of the Hamlet of Sprout Brook. The other main tributary is Brimstone Creek which enters the creek north-northwest of the Village of Ames.

== Course ==
=== Source to Brimstone Creek ===
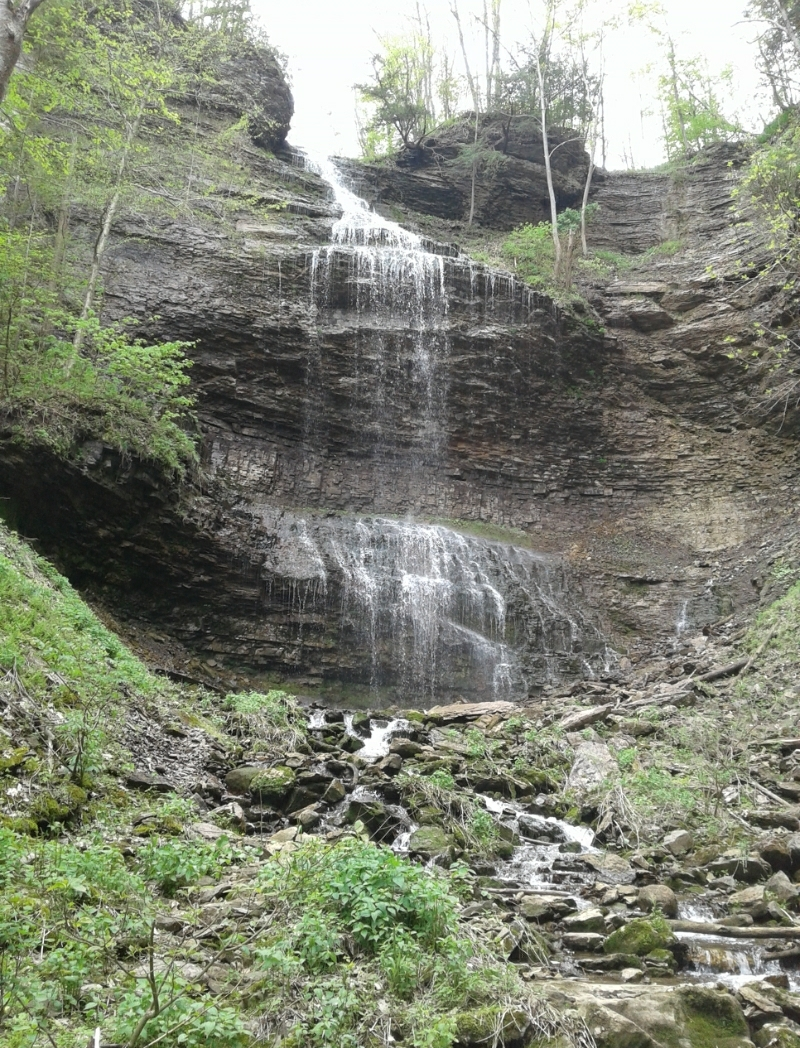
Judds Falls in May 2019

Canajoharie Creek begins in a forested area north of the village of Cherry Valley along St. Butler Road. It starts traveling northward for a short distance, crossing under U.S. Route 20, then reaches the first waterfall on the creek called Judds Falls, also known as Tekaharawa Falls. The creek continues northward after the falls for a short distance to just before Van Derwerker Road, where it turns to the east and begins to parallel the road, and crosses under Mill Road. After crossing under Mill Road, the creek starts to parallel Mill Road. After a short distance, it crosses under Cherry Valley Road, Otsego Road, and then Vandeusenville Road. Shortly after crossing under Vandeusenville Road it meets the confluence of Bowmans Creek, just east of the hamlet of Sprout Brook.

After the confluence of Bowmans Creek, Canajoharie Creek begins to parallel State Route 163 (Sprout Brook Road) and crosses under Vandeusenville Road for the second time. It continues traveling eastward passing to the south of the hamlet of Buel. After passing Buel, it crosses under South Buel Road and then crosses under Macphall Road. After crossing under Mcphall Road, the river curves to the north for a short distance, crossing under West Ames Road, then curves back eastward. After the turn back to the east, the creek reaches the confluence of Brimstone Creek north-northwest of the village of Ames.

=== Brimstone Creek to mouth ===
Shortly after the confluence, the creek crosses under State Route 10, passing to the north of the village of Ames. It then continues eastward and crosses under Shunk Road and Mapletown Road curving to the north briefly then back to the west by the hamlet of Waterville. After the brief foray to the west it turns northward crossing Old Tavern Road, then after a short distance, parallels Maple Hill Road for a few hundred feet. It then turns to the northwest and reaches State Route 10 once again, and begins to parallel it. The creek then passes to the east of the hamlet of Marshville, and under Mc Ewan Road. Shortly after crossing under Mc Ewan Road, it curves to the east and begins to parallel Maple Hill.

Roughly halfway along Maple Hill, the creek enters into the Canajoharie Gorge, as it passes Wintergreen Flats. Then roughly 1.5 miles (2.4 km) from the mouth, the creek flows over the 45-foot (14 m) Canajoharie Falls. The stream then continues to flow through a narrow deep canyon towards the Mohawk River. Along the way is a deep pothole called "the boiling pot". After this the creek passes through the Village of Canajoharie and under State Route 5S before converging with the Mohawk River.

== History ==
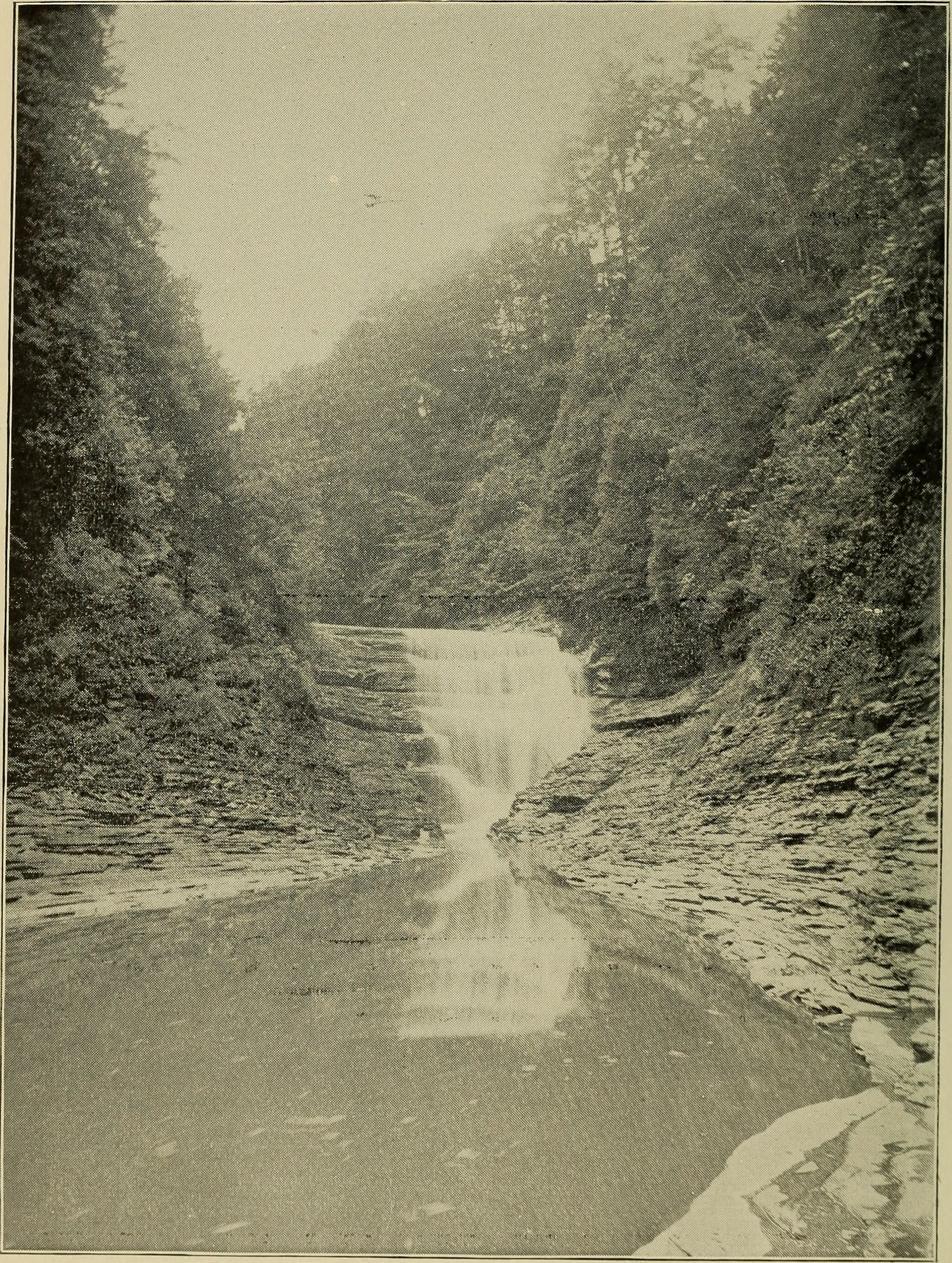
Canajoharie Falls in 1894

The first Europeans to settle along the creek were Hendrick Schrembling and Marte Janse Van Alstyne around 1730 in the present village of Canajoharie. In 1750, Schrembling sold his property to his business partner, Van Alstyne. Schrembling remained in the area and ran a tavern, store and grist mill, but moved away by the end of the American Revolution. In 1772, Colonel Hendrick Frey built a mill and house along the creek.

Johannes Roof, who arrived in 1778, bought Schrembling's properties and continued to run the inn. Located on the east bank of the creek is the house built by Gose Van Alstyne, son of Marte Janse Van Alstyne. It was built around 1775 and fortified around 1780. It was first called Fort Van Rensselaer and then changed to Fort Washington.

There were early roads that followed the creek that led to the villages of Sharon Springs and Cherry Valley. One of the roads led to Otsego Lake and branched off at the village of Ames. The road to Otsego Lake was used by General James Clinton's American army in 1779. The army had camps along the creek in the hamlets of Buel and Sprout Brook. The troops reached Otsego Lake between July 2 and 4th of 1779. Parts of this road are now known as Clinton's Road or Continental Road.

At times people have had to be rescued from the creek near Wintergreen Park due to flash flooding. In July 2017, 13 people were trapped due to a flash flood, then rescued from the creek near the pools located in the creek off Mill Street by the village of Canajoharie. In April 2019, high water from storms caused a retaining wall to collapse in the village of Canajoharie.

== Etymology ==
The name "Canajoharie" is said to be a Mohawk language term meaning "the pot that washes itself," referring to the "Canajoharie Boiling Pot," a 20 feet (6.1 m) wide and 10 feet (3.0 m) deep pothole in the Canajoharie Creek, just south of the Village of Canajoharie. The pothole was formed, over thousands of years, by the action of water and pebbles in the bedrock.

In the 1700s and before, the Mohawk people, a section of Iroquois Confederacy, were based in the Mohawk Valley, which included the area around the creek. Their territory ranged north to the St. Lawrence River, southern Quebec and eastern Ontario; south to greater New Jersey and into Pennsylvania; eastward to the Green Mountains of Vermont; and westward to the border with the Iroquoian Oneida Nation's traditional homeland territory.

== Geology ==
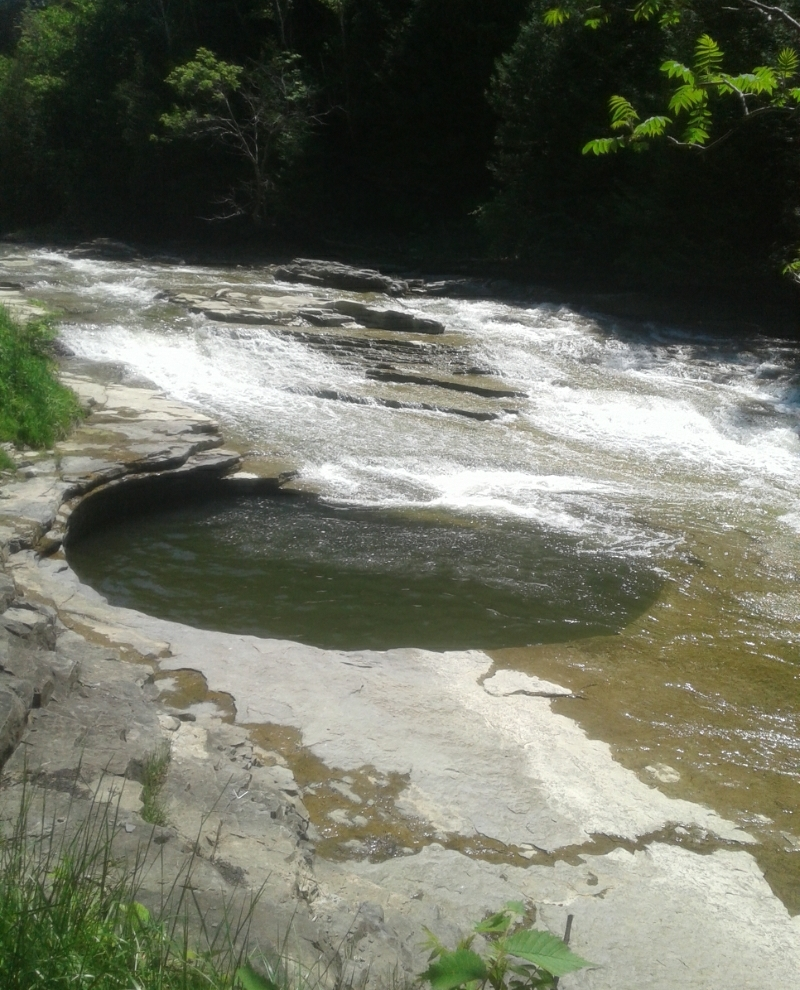
The "pot that washes itself" located just south of the Village of Canajoharie

Like other gorges and ravines, Canajoharie Gorge was formed by erosion. The giant pothole located in the gorge, known as "the boiling pot", was formed by rocks eroding the surface of the limestone bed.

Rocks in the river bed include mostly dolomite, of the Beekmantown Group. Some parts are limestone mixed with shale of the Trenton Group, which was deposited during the Trentonian stage of the middle to late Ordovician (circa 448-458 Ma). Certain areas are overlain by the Utica Shale, roughly 1,000 feet (300 m) thick in some areas. At Wintergreen Park, the Utica Shale is a black and thinly laminated with bentonite. The occurrence of bentonite shows that volcanic ash once fell in that area or nearby. Between here and the mouth, certain sections contain fossils, including trilobites, brachiopods and graptolites.

== Hydrology ==
The United States Geological Survey (USGS) maintains two stream gauges along Canajoharie Creek. The upper one, in operation since 1993, is located 10 feet (3.0 m) upstream from the bridge on Mc Ewan Road, and 2.3 miles (3.7 km) southwest of the village of Canajoharie. The lower one is located at the creek's mouth.

Graph from upper USGS stream gauge showing rise in discharge after Tropical Storm Irene

The upper station had a maximum discharge of 5,850 cubic feet (166 m^{3}) per second and a gauge height of 10.76 feet (3.28 m) on August 28, 2011, as Hurricane Irene passed through the area. It had minimum discharge of .23 cubic feet (0.0065 m^{3}) per second and a gauge height of 1.26 feet (0.38 m) on September 10, 2015. The upper station had a maximum water temperature of 99 °F (37 °C) on July 15, 1995.

There was formerly a stream gauge just east of Sprout Brook located where Vandeusenville Road crosses the creek. It was in service from June 14, 1994 to December 19, 1995. This station had a maximum discharge of 154 cubic feet (4.4 m^{3}) per second on June 3, 1995, and a minimum discharge of .49 cubic feet (0.014 m^{3}) per second on September 6, 1994. Another former stream gauge was located southwest of the hamlet of Sprout Brook where Mill Road crosses the creek. It was in service from September 7, 1994 to August 22, 1995. This station had a maximum recorded discharge of 3.53 cubic feet (0.100 m^{3}) per second on September 7, 1994, and a minimum recorded discharge of .70 cubic feet (0.020 m^{3}) per second on August 22, 1995.

The USGS has been sampling water quality in this watershed since 1994. The DEC rates the Canajoharie Creek's water quality at Class C, suitable for fishing and non-contact human recreation.

== Fishing ==
In spring 2019, and years in the past, the DEC stocked 1,330 8-to-9-inch-long (20 to 23 cm) and 100 12-to-15-inch-long (30 to 38 cm) brown trout into the creek. Other species of fish in the creek are carp. Suckers can be speared and taken from the section of the creek from the mouth upstream about 0.5-mile (0.80 km) from January 1 to May 15, each year.

== See also ==
- List of rivers of New York
