= Canajoharie Falls =

Waterfall in the U.S. State of New York

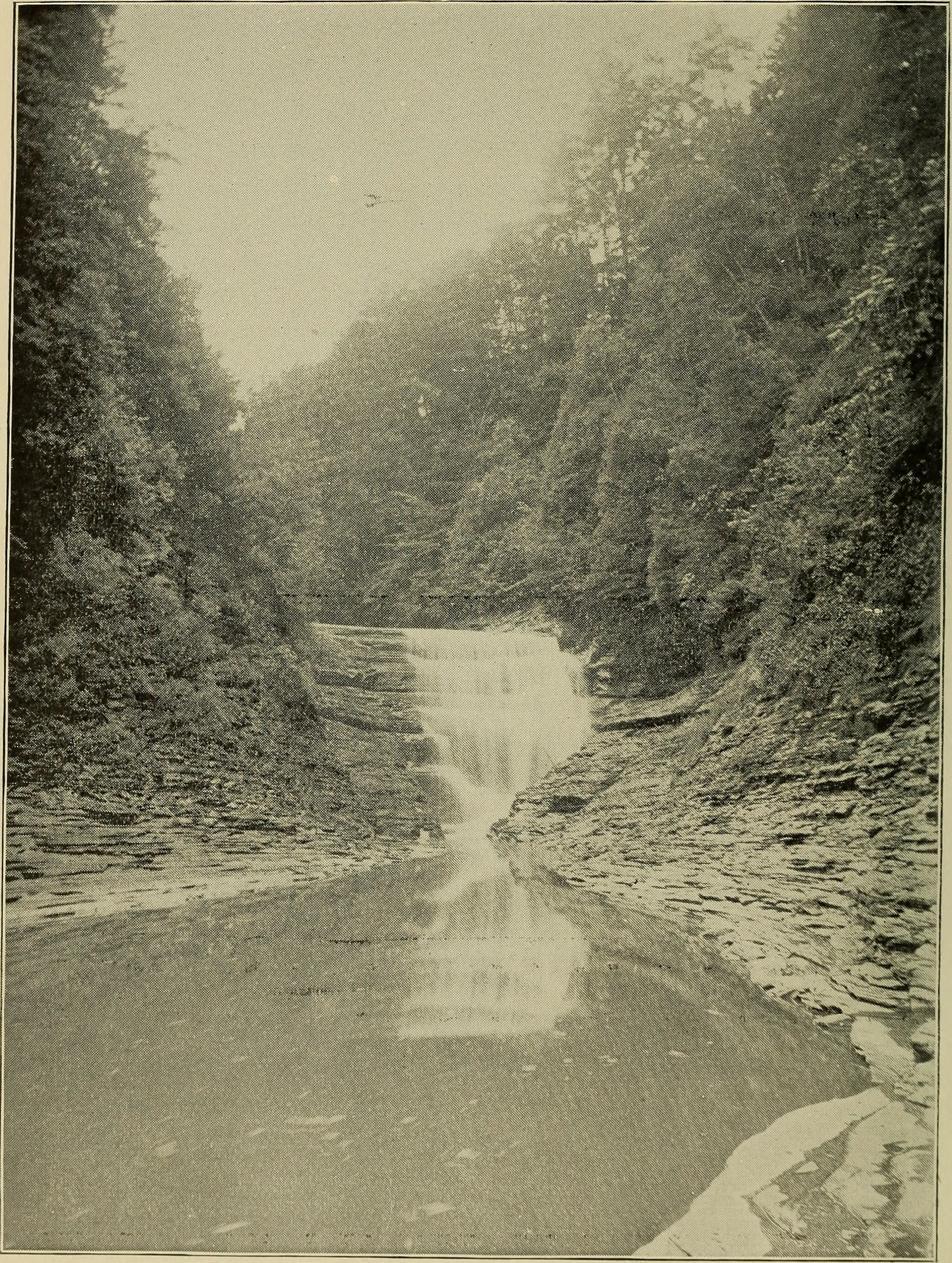
- 1894 picture of Canajoharie Falls

- Location within New York Adirondack Park Location within the United States
- Coordinates: 42°53′33″N 74°33′56″W
- Elevation: 433 ft (132 m)
- Watercourse: Canajoharie Creek

Canajoharie Falls is a waterfall located on Canajoharie Creek south of Canajoharie, New York.
