= Hessville, New York =

- Hamlet
- Location within New York Location within the United States
- Coordinates: 42°52′26″N 74°41′14″W
- Country: United States
- State: New York
- Region: Central New York Region
- County: Montgomery
- Town: Minden
- Elevation: 935 ft (285 m)
- Time zone: UTC-5 (Eastern (EST))
  - Summer (DST): UTC-4 (EDT)
- Area code: 518

Hessville is a hamlet in the town of Minden in Montgomery County, New York, United States. It is located on New York State Route 163 (NY 163).
