= Ames, New York =

- Village
- Location within New York Location within the United States
- Coordinates: 42°50′15″N 74°36′06″W
- Country: United States
- State: New York
- County: Montgomery
- Town: Canajoharie

Area
  - Total: 0.13 sq mi (0.34 km^{2})
  - Land: 0.13 sq mi (0.34 km^{2})
  - Water: 0 sq mi (0.00 km^{2})
- Elevation: 705 ft (215 m)

Population (2020)
  - Total: 138
  - Density: 1,055.8/sq mi (407.66/km^{2})
- Time zone: UTC-5 (Eastern (EST))
  - Summer (DST): UTC-4 (EDT)
- ZIP code: 13317
- Area code: 518
- FIPS code: 36-01737
- GNIS feature ID: 942431

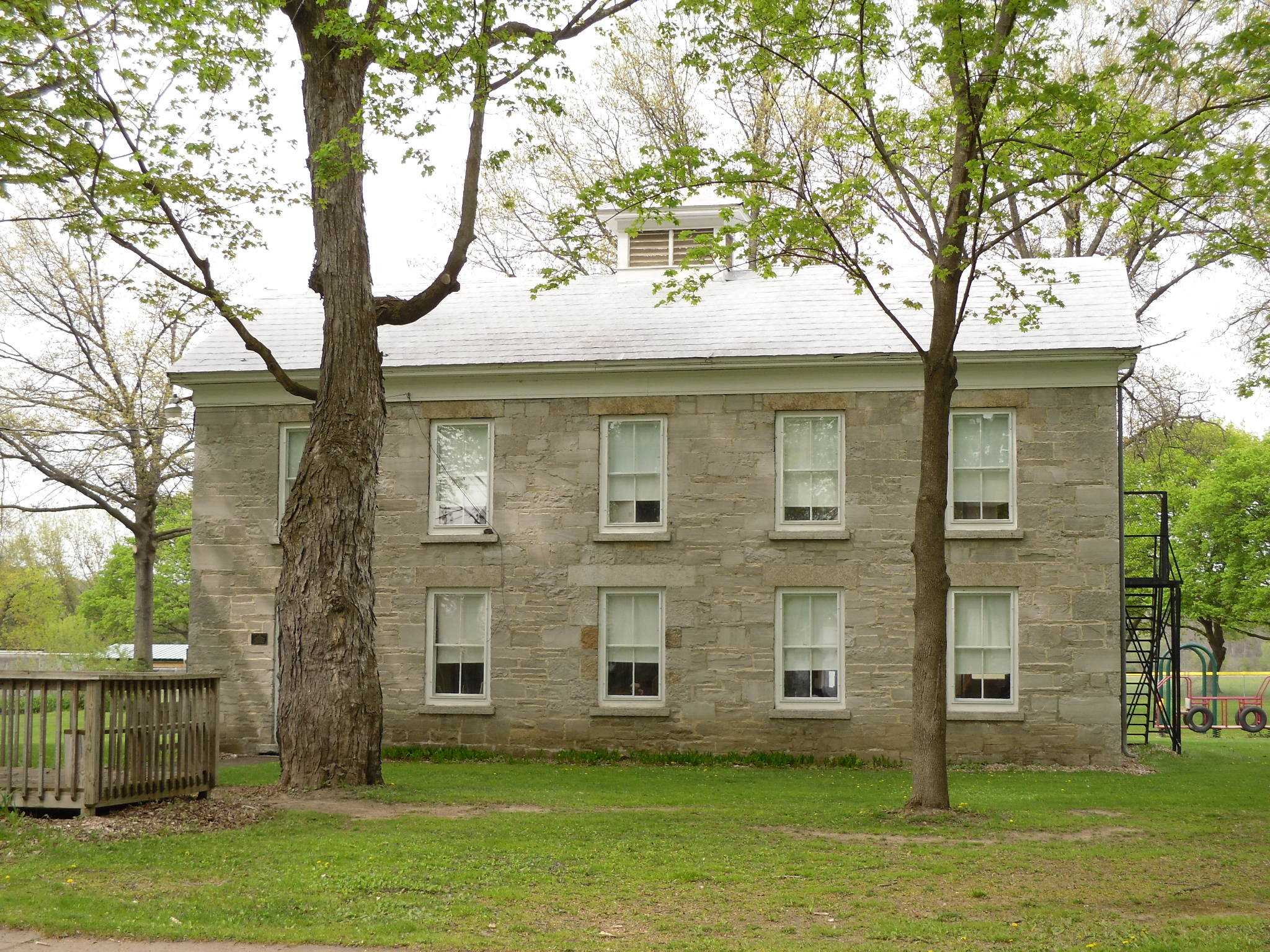
Ames Academy Building

Ames is a village in Montgomery County, New York, United States. The population was 138 at the 2020 census. It is within the town of Canajoharie. As of 2025, it is the smallest village in upstate New York.

== History ==
Unlike other communities in the region, settled by Germans, Ames was settled by pioneers from New England around 1779. The village was incorporated in 1924.

The Ames Academy Building was listed on the National Register of Historic Places in 2002.

== Geography ==
Ames is in southwestern Montgomery County, in the southern part of the town of Canajoharie. New York State Route 10 passes through the village leading north 6 miles (10 km) to Canajoharie village and south 4 miles (6 km) to Sharon Springs.

According to the U.S. Census Bureau, the village of Ames has an area of 0.13 square miles (0.34 km^{2}), all land. Brimstone Creek crosses the southern side of the village, flowing north to join Canajoharie Creek, a north-flowing tributary of the Mohawk River.

== Demographics ==
Historical population
Census	Pop.	Note	%±
1870	150		—
1880	148		−1.3%
1930	170		—
1940	180		5.9%
1950	193		7.2%
1960	162		−16.1%
1970	198		22.2%
1980	224		13.1%
1990	166		−25.9%
2000	173		4.2%
2010	145		−16.2%
2020	138		−4.8%
U.S. Decennial Census

As of the census of 2000, there were 173 people, 68 households, and 49 families residing in the village. The population density was 1,305.7 inhabitants per square mile (504.1/km^{2}). There were 72 housing units at an average density of 543.4 per square mile (209.8/km^{2}). The racial makeup of the village was 99.42% White, and 0.58% from two or more races.

There were 68 households, out of which 26.5% had children under the age of 18 living with them, 66.2% were married couples living together, 4.4% had a female householder with no husband present, and 26.5% were non-families. 22.1% of all households were made up of individuals, and 8.8% had someone living alone who was 65 years of age or older. The average household size was 2.54 and the average family size was 3.02.

In the village, the population was spread out, with 26.0% under the age of 18, 5.8% from 18 to 24, 29.5% from 25 to 44, 23.1% from 45 to 64, and 15.6% who were 65 years of age or older. The median age was 36 years. For every 100 females, there were 101.2 males. For every 100 females age 18 and over, there were 103.2 males.

The median income for a household in the village was $32,500, and the median income for a family was $38,750. Males had a median income of $30,000 versus $23,750 for females. The per capita income for the village was $17,794. About 8.7% of families and 8.8% of the population were below the poverty line, including 13.2% of those under the age of eighteen and 16.7% of those sixty-five or over.

== Notable people ==
- Alexander Randall, sixth governor of Wisconsin

== See also ==
- List of incorporated places in New York's Capital District
