= Sprout Brook, New York =

- Hamlet
- Location within New York Location within the United States
- Coordinates: 42°51′03″N 74°41′07″W
- Country: United States
- State: New York
- Region: Central New York
- County: Montgomery
- Town: Canajoharie
- Elevation: 720 ft (220 m)
- Time zone: UTC-5 (Eastern (EST))
  - Summer (DST): UTC-4 (EDT)
- Area code: 518

Sprout Brook is a hamlet in the town of Canajoharie in Montgomery County, New York, United States. It is located 60 miles (97 km) west of Albany. New York State Route 163 passes through the hamlet, as does Bowmans Creek.

== Notable person ==
- Henry J. Kaiser, industrialist
