= Ots-Toch =

- Born: after 1620; Canajoharie, New York
- Died: 1646
- Citizenship: Mohawk people
- Spouse: Cornelis Antonissen Van Slyck
- Children: three sons, two known daughters
- Father: Hartell
- Family

Ots-Toch (c. 1620 – 1640) was a Mohawk woman from Canajoharie, New York. She married an early Dutch colonist, and her children became interpreters between the Mohawk nation and New Netherland.

== Name ==
Her name is also written Ots-toch. As with so much of her life, the source for this name is unknown; contemporary records of New Netherland do not mention it. The name does not appear on paper until the 19th century.

== Personal life ==
Her father was Jacques Hartell, a French trader, who married a Mohawk woman who owned Hog Island near Schenectady, New York, circa 1620. The couple had two daughters, Ots-toch and Kenutje. A paternal lineage identifying Jacques Hartell as her father has been identified by Cynthia Brott Biasca's article "Jacques Hertel and the Indian Princesses" as unsupported by any 17th century primary sources.

Ots-Toch was near Canajoharie, New York, though according to some assessments of her life story, she was born considerably earlier.

She married Dutch settler Cornelis Antonissen Van Slyke and founded the Van Slyke family in New Netherland.

The couple had three sons and at least two daughters. Her son Jacques Van Slyck inherited land from Ots-toch.

She died in 1646. Ots-Toch and Cornelise had at least three children who survived to adulthood and served as interpreters between the Mohawk nation and the Dutch, including Jacques Cornelius Van Slyck (Itsychosaquachka), Marten Maurice van Slyck, and Hillitie.

== Family ==
Little is known of Ots-Toch, although she is indirectly referenced in many histories of early New York. For example, her daughter, Hillitie, chose to live with the Dutch, but served as an official Mohawk interpreter. Ots-Toch had at least three other children with Cornelise Van Slyke, and may have had more children by a Mohawk father. Cornelise Van Slyke lived with the Mohawk according to matrilineal tradition, and he was chosen as an official delegate of New Netherlands to the Mohawk. Their children also became interpreters for the Mohawk.

The fullest early record of her says that her daughter Hilletie and her son Jacques Van Slyck were "half-breeds", indicating mixed race, and there is no indication that Hilletie's staunchly anti-Christian mother was daughter of a French Catholic. This record, from a 1680 interview with Hilletie, appears in the "Journal of Jasper Danckaerts." That journal and other records from her lifetime do not mention her name, which does not appear in accounts before the 19th century, leading some historians to question its authenticity. On the other hand, the Mohawk name of her son Jacques was documented by the Dutch during his lifetime.

== Legacy ==
In local lore, Ots-Toch is often compared to Pocahontas, another 17th century Native American who married a European colonist. But Pocahontas eventually moved to Great Britain and converted to Christianity, whereas Ots-Toch remained with the Mohawk and is reported to have rejected European religion.

Like many of the people living in and around New Netherland, her life was scarcely documented, with not so much as a mention of her name. Most of what has been written about her is conjectural and based on oral tradition. If the name Ots-Toch is traditional rather than historical, one possible inspiration for it was the Mohawk god, Otskon (Ots-kon), who was mercurial in temperament, just as she was.

== Sources ==
- Bielinski, Stefan. "Hilletie Van Slyck Van Olinda". People of Colonial Albany. New York State Museum.
- Biasca, Cynthia Brott. "Jacques Hertel and the Indian Princesses". Archived from the original on 11 January 2002.
- Gade, Dianne (7 June 2011). "Who Was Ots-Toch?".
- Pearson, Jonathan (1883). A history of the Schenectady Patent in Dutch and English Times; being contributions towards a History of the Lower Mohawk Valley. Albany, NY.
