= Canajoharie (village), New York =

Canajoharie, New York
- Village
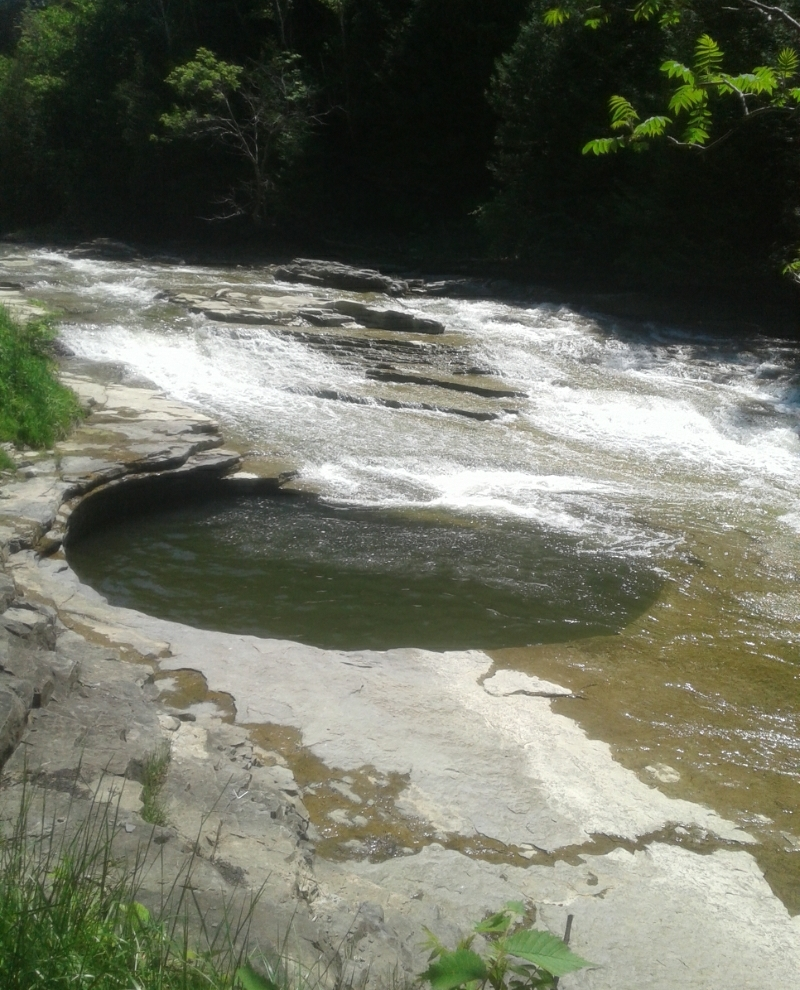
- The "pot that washes itself" located just south of the Village of Canajoharie on the Canajoharie Creek

- Location within the state of New York
- Coordinates: 42°54′11″N 74°34′16″W
- Country: United States
- State: New York
- County: Montgomery
- Town: Canajoharie

Government
  - Type: Mayor-Council government
  - Mayor: Austin Countryman [R]
  - Village Board: Trustees: • Peter Lyden (I); • Tracey Stetin (I); • Edward Watt (I); • Daniel Pickel (I)

Area
  - Total: 1.40 sq mi (3.62 km^{2})
  - Land: 1.33 sq mi (3.45 km^{2})
  - Water: 0.069 sq mi (0.18 km^{2})
- Elevation: 305 ft (93 m)

Population (2020)
  - Total: 2,080
  - Density: 1,530.7/sq mi (590.99/km^{2})
- Demonym: Canajoharian
- Time zone: UTC-5 (Eastern (EST))
  - Summer (DST): UTC-4 (EDT)
- ZIP code: 13317
- Area code: 518
- FIPS code: 36-12111
- GNIS feature ID: 0945734
- Website: https://villageofcanajoharie.org/

Canajoharie (/ˌkænədʒəˈhɛəri/) is a village in the Town of Canajoharie in Montgomery County, New York, United States, south of the Mohawk River and Erie canal. As of the 2020 census, the village had a population of 2,080. The name is said to be a Mohawk language term meaning "the pot that washes itself," referring to the "Canajoharie Boiling Pot," a large fluvial pothole in the gorge of the Canajoharie Creek, which bisects the Village.

The Village of Canajoharie is at the north border of the Town of Canajoharie; it is west of Amsterdam and east of Utica. The village and town name also refer to Canajoharie, a historic Mohawk settlement that was located west of the current Village, referred to as the "Upper Castle" by the English colonists who settled in the area in around 1723. A church stands at that site from the pre-revolutionary era; the Mohawk Upper Castle Historic District is a National Historic Landmark.

The Village of Canajoharie is home to one of a handful of operating "dummy lights" in the United States, located downtown at the intersection of Church, Mohawk and Montgomery Streets (also known as Wagner Square). It is a traffic signal on a pedestal located in the middle of an intersection; the light was first installed in 1926. After a couple of semi-truck collisions which occurred in August and November 2021, the dummy light was removed from Wagner Square and as of May 2025 has been restored and reinstalled with a new foundation by the administration that assumed office in April 2023, using funds obtained from the insurance carriers of the trucks that damaged it. Two others are currently located in New York State, in Beacon and Croton-on-Hudson.

The Erie Canal passes the north side of the village.

The village was the headquarters for the manufacturing operations of the Beech-Nut baby food company from its founding in 1891 until the plant was closed in March 2011 with production moving to the town of Florida in the same county, on the south side of the river.

Phoenix Block Canajoharie

In 2015, most of the village (and a small area to its south) was listed on the National Register of Historic Places as the Canajoharie Historic District, due to its importance as a transportation hub over its existence and the well-preserved architecture from different eras. In addition, the Bragdon-Lipe House, the Van Alstyne Homestead, the West Hill School, and the United States Post Office are individually listed on the National Register of Historic Places.

== History ==
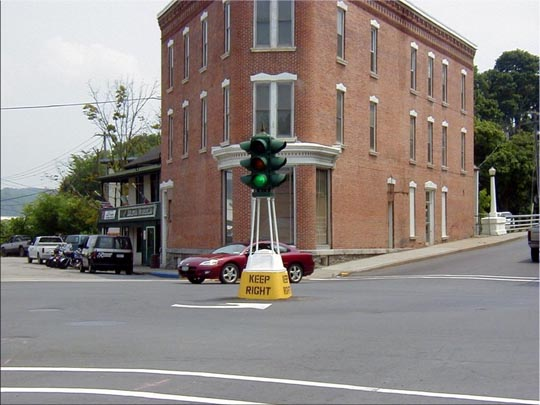
The historic "dummy light" in downtown Canajoharie, New York. It was removed from the intersection in November 2021, but reinstalled four years later.

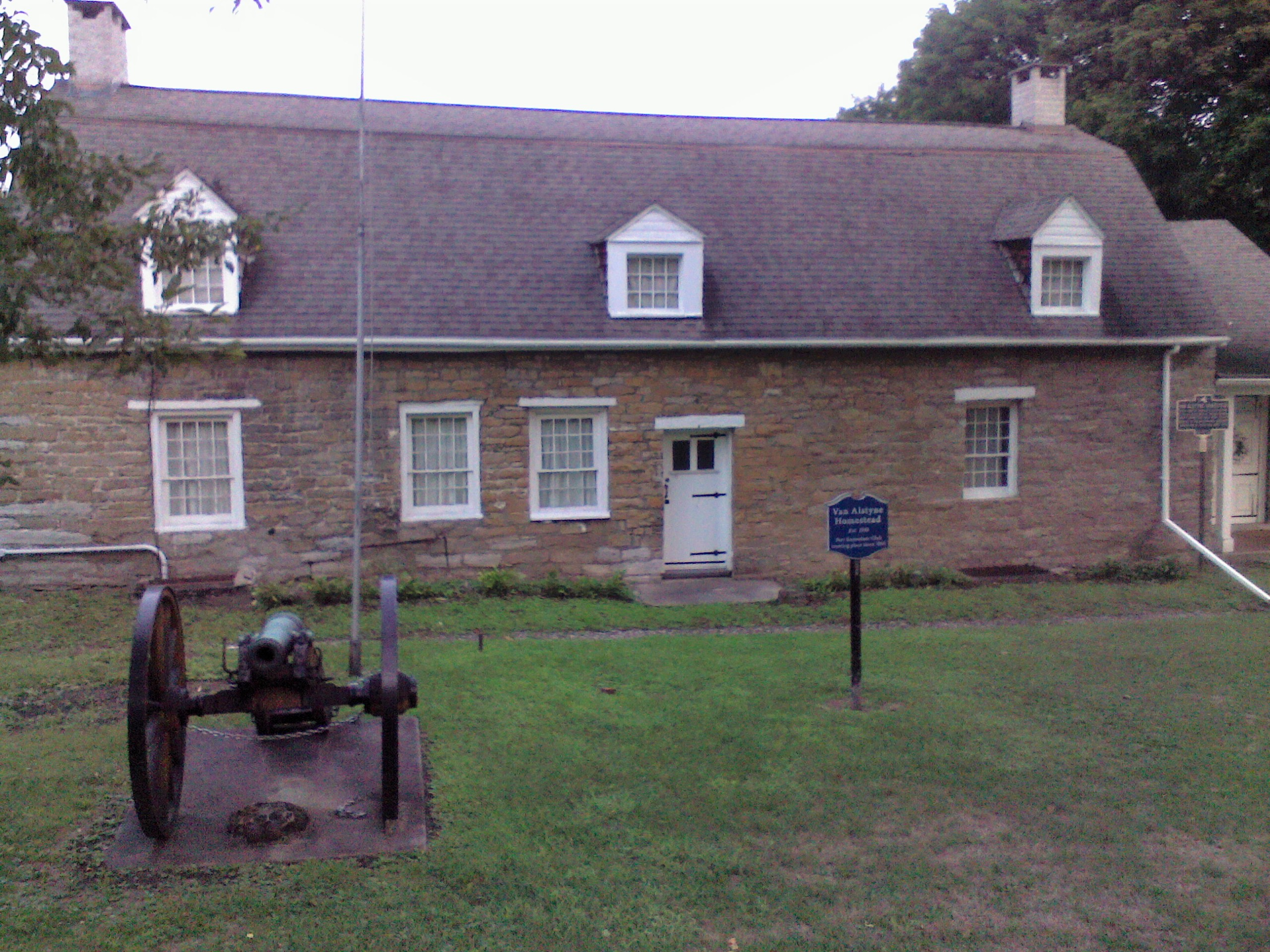
Van Alstyne Homestead in Canajoharie is listed on the National Register of Historic Places

The current village is located east of the historic Canajoharie, and was originally home of the Mahican, an Algonquin tribe that migrated between 1500 and 1600. The Mahican later became known as the Mohawk. Canajoharie (Mohawk: Kana’tsioharé:ke) was one of two major towns of the Mohawk nation in the late 17th and 18th centuries.

The area was settled by Palatinate Germans in 1723 and called “Roof’s Village” . It was after the Revolutionary war that the area was renamed to Canajoharie, referring to a geological feature in the Canajoharie Creek.

The Mohawk Upper Castle Historic District in the former area contains the Upper Castle Church (1769) and archeological sites related to Mohawk and Iroquois history; it is a National Historic Landmark.

Palatine German settlers, Protestant refugees from religious wars in Europe, were allowed to establish a community in this area in the 1730s. They had earlier lived in work camps along the Hudson River in Dutchess County, to pay off their passage from England, which was paid by Queen Anne's government. Their community was called "Roofville" (according to anglicized spelling) after early inhabitant Johannes Rueff. The village was incorporated in 1829.

During the middle of the 19th century, three fires almost destroyed the village. Because of the losses due to the fires, the village passed an ordinance prohibiting houses to be constructed of wood. Many of the older houses in the town are made of brick or locally quarried stone.

After the Revolutionary War, George Washington visited Canajoharie. He had been in the region to survey damage done to nearby Cherry Valley from a destructive raid by Joseph Brant, a noted Mohawk chief allied with the British, and his forces. Washington stayed the night at Van Alstyne Homestead (sometimes referred to as Fort Rensselaer), a common meeting place.

Hotel Wagner, Canajoharie, NY.

== Geography ==
According to the United States Census Bureau, the village has a total area of 1.3 square miles (3.5 km^{2}), of which 1.3 square miles (3.4 km^{2}) is land and 0.04 square mile (0.1 km^{2}) (2.99%) is water.

The village is on the south bank of the Mohawk River.

The New York State Thruway, New York State Route 5S (East Main St/West Main St/Erie Blvd), and New York State Route 10 (Church St/Rock St/Wheeler St/Walnut St/Reed St) pass through the village. On the opposite bank of the Mohawk is the community of Palatine Bridge in the Town of Palatine; both names refer to the colonial German settlers.

Wintergreen Park is one mile from the village downtown and offers views of the Canajoharie Gorge and the Canajoharie Falls.

Interior of Beechnut Peanut Butter Plant

== Demographics ==
Historical population
Census	Pop.	Note	%±
1840	1,146		—
1850	2,000		74.5%
1860	1,500		−25.0%
1870	1,822		21.5%
1880	2,013		10.5%
1890	2,089		3.8%
1900	2,101		0.6%
1910	2,273		8.2%
1920	2,415		6.2%
1930	2,519		4.3%
1940	2,577		2.3%
1950	2,761		7.1%
1960	2,681		−2.9%
1970	2,686		0.2%
1980	2,412		−10.2%
1990	2,278		−5.6%
2000	2,257		−0.9%
2010	2,229		−1.2%
2020	2,080		−6.7%
U.S. Decennial Census

As of the census of 2010, there were 2,229 people, 929 households, and 567 families residing in the village. The population density was 1,741.5 inhabitants per square mile (672.4/km^{2}). There were 1,037 housing units at an average density of 777.0 per square mile (300.0/km^{2}). The racial makeup of the village was 95% White, 2.2% Black or African American, 0.4% Native American, 0.6% Asian, 0.6% from other races, and 1.2% from two or more races. Hispanic or Latino of any race were 2.3% of the population.

Interior of Beechnut Peanut Butter Plant

There were 929 households, out of which 30.9% had children under the age of 18 living with them, 40.4% were married couples living together, 14.3% had a female householder with no husband present, and 39% were non-families. 32.9% of all households were made up of individuals, and 27.7% had someone living alone who was 65 years of age or older. The average household size was 2.37 and the average family size was 2.96.

In the village, the population was spread out, with 27.5% under the age of 18, 5.7% from 18 to 24, 26% from 25 to 44, 26.1% from 45 to 64, and 15.6% who were 65 years of age or older. The median age was 38 years. For every 100 females, there were 90.3 males. For every 100 females age 18 and over, there were 84.3 males.

The median income for a household in the village was $32,169, and the median income for a family was $46,544. Males had a median income of $39,833 versus $36,394 for females. The per capita income for the village was $20,486. About 13.0% of families and 12.4% of the population were below the poverty line, including 31.8% of those under age 18 and 23.7% of those age 65 or over.

== Notable people ==
- Susan B. Anthony, women's rights pioneer, taught school here.
- Joseph Brant, Mohawk chief.
- Molly Brant, Mohawk leader.
- Chad Michael Collins, actor
- Alfred Conkling, was a lawyer, statesman, and jurist.
- Frederick Conkling, son of Alfred Conkling and brother of Roscoe Conkling. He became a US Representative for the state of New York.
- Josiah Failing, fourth mayor of Portland, Oregon. He gained much of his wealth, as an entrepreneur through general merchandise.
- Bernhard Gillam, a political cartoonist. He died of typhoid in Canajoharie, New York.
- Myron Grimshaw, major league baseball player. A right fielder for the Boston Red Sox for three seasons, 1905-1907.
- Thomas James, a former slave who became a minister in upstate New York, and published a well-regarded memoir.
- Jacob Klock, was the colonel of the 2nd regiment of the Tryon County militia during the American Revolutionary War.
- Sean MacFarland, Lieut. Gen., Commanding General of US Army's 1st Armored Division and Fort Bliss, Texas, later Commanding General of US Army's III Corps and Fort Hood, Texas
- Charles McVean, US Representative for the state of New York. While in Canajoharie, he was the editor of the towns newspaper.
- Ots-Toch, 17th-century Mohawk woman from Canajoharie who married the Dutch trader Cornelius Anthonisse Van Slyck; together they founded the Van Slyck family in New Netherland.
- Edwin M. Randall, Chief Justice for the state of Florida.
- Hendrick Theyanoguin, Mohawk leader.
- Benjamin Van Alstyne, was head coach of Michigan State University basketball team from, (1927–1949).
- Cliff Street Looking West
  Rebecca Winters, Mormon pioneer.

Beech Nut Plant 1933

== Notes ==
- City of Beacon. Canajoharie, New York: Credits. Retrieved September 30, 2008.
- Croton-on-Hudson Historical Society. Canajoharie, New York: Credits. Retrieved September 30, 2008.
- Villages of Canajoharie & Palatine Bridge. Canajoharie, New York: Credits.
