= Montgomery County, New York =

County in New York, United States

- County
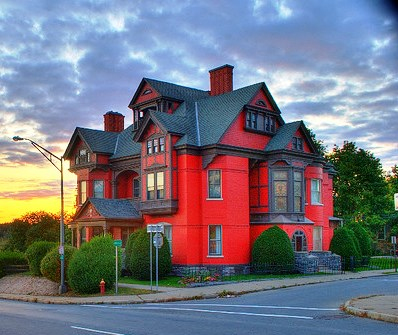
- Greene Mansion in Amsterdam

- Flag Seal

- Location within the U.S. state of New York
- Coordinates: 42°55′N 74°26′W
- Country: United States
- State: New York
- Founded: March 12, 1772
- Named for: Richard Montgomery
- Seat: Fonda
- Largest city: Amsterdam

Area
  - Total: 410 sq mi (1,100 km^{2})
  - Land: 403 sq mi (1,040 km^{2})
  - Water: 7.3 sq mi (19 km^{2}) 1.8%

Population (2020)
  - Total: 49,532
  - Estimate (2025): 50,046 ▲
  - Density: 124.2/sq mi (48.0/km^{2})
- Time zone: UTC−5 (Eastern)
  - Summer (DST): UTC−4 (EDT)
- Congressional districts: 20th, 21st
- Website: www.montgomerycountyny.gov

Montgomery County is a county in the U.S. state of New York. As of the 2020 census, the population was 49,532. The county seat is Fonda. The county was named in honor of Richard Montgomery, an American Revolutionary War general killed in 1775 at the Battle of Quebec. The county is part of the Mohawk Valley region of the state.

The county is part of the Albany-Schenectady-Troy combined statistical area.

Historically occupied by the Mohawk people, one of the original Five Nations of the Haudenosaunee Confederacy, the county was created in 1772 during the period of British colonial rule as Tryon County. In 1784, after the Americans gained independence in the War, it was renamed Montgomery County for one of the heroes.

Montgomery County comprises the Amsterdam, NY micropolitan statistical area. The county borders the north and south banks of the Mohawk River.

== History ==
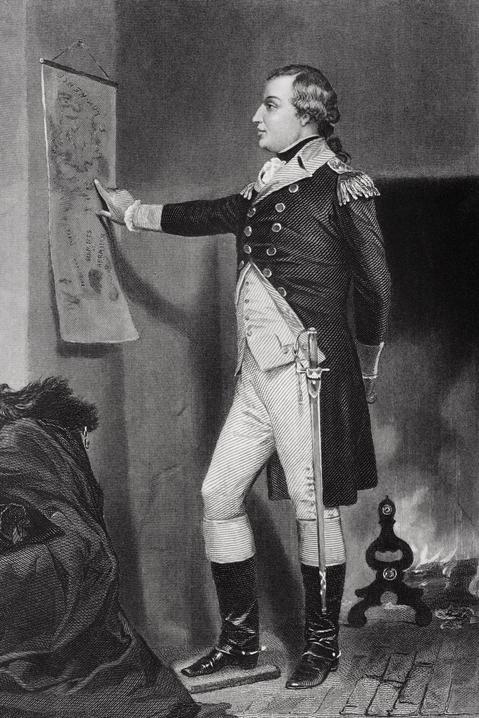
Major general Richard Montgomery, namesake of Montgomery County

This area was occupied by the Mohawk for hundreds of years prior to European colonization. Many warriors allied with the British during the war. When the British lost, they ceded all the Haudenosaunee territory of the Six Nations (the Tuscarora had joined the confederacy in the 18th century) to the United States, without consulting the tribes or bringing them into negotiation.

In 1784, following end of the American Revolutionary War, the European-American settlers renamed Tryon County as Montgomery County. This change was to honor the general, Richard Montgomery, who had captured several places in Canada and died in 1775 attempting to capture the city of Quebec during the Revolutionary War. It replaced the name that formerly honored the last provincial governor of New York.

In 1789, Ontario County was split off from Montgomery. The area of the new county was much larger than the present Ontario County, as it included the present Allegany, Cattaraugus, Chautauqua, Erie, Genesee, Livingston, Monroe, Niagara, Orleans, Steuben, Wyoming, Yates, and part of Schuyler and Wayne counties.

In 1791, Herkimer, Otsego, and Tioga counties were split off from Montgomery. In 1802, portions of Clinton, Herkimer, and Montgomery counties were combined to form St. Lawrence County. In 1816, Hamilton County was split off from Montgomery, but it did not have enough taxable inhabitants to be separately organized until 1847. In May 1836, the county seat was moved from Johnstown to Fonda, and in April 1838, Fulton County was split off, with Johnstown regaining that rank for the new Fulton County.

In 2012, Montgomery County voters approved a charter for government, making it the 21st county in New York state to do so. In 2013, Matthew L. Ossenfort was elected at-large as the first County Executive in the county's history. Ossenfort took office in 2014, the same year the charter went into effect. Under the terms of the charter, the Board of Supervisors was replaced by a nine-member County Legislature, with members elected from single-member districts. Thomas L. Quackenbush, one of the members, was elected as the first chairman of the new legislative body, which will be a circulating position.

=== Congressional districts ===
- 1789–1797 - None
- 1797–1803 - NY9
- 1803–1809 - NY13
- 1809–1813 - NY9
- 1813–1823 - NY14
- 1823–1833 - NY16
- 1833–1843 - NY15
- 1843–1853 - NY17
- 1853–1873 - NY18
- 1873–1875 - NY19
- 1875–1893 - NY20
- 1893–1913 - ?
- 1913–1945 - NY30
- 1945–1953 - NY31
- 1953–1963 - NY32
- 1963–1971 - NY35
- 1971–1973 - NY28 & NY29
- 1973–1983 - NY28 & NY31
- 1983–1993 - NY23 & ?
- 1993–2003 - NY21 & NY23
- 2003–2013- NY21
- 2013–2023 - NY19 & NY20
- 2023–present - NY20 & NY21

== Geography ==
According to the U.S. Census Bureau, the county has a total area of 410 square miles (1,100 km^{2}), of which 403 square miles (1,040 km^{2}) is land and 7.3 square miles (19 km^{2}) (1.8%) is water.

Montgomery County is located in the central part of the state, west of the city of Schenectady and northwest of Albany.

=== Adjacent counties ===
- Fulton County - north
- Saratoga County - east
- Schenectady County - east
- Schoharie County - south
- Otsego County - southwest
- Herkimer County - west

The Erie Canal runs through Montgomery County parallel to the Mohawk River, connecting to the Wood River to the west, which leads to Lake Ontario. Overall, the canal connected Great Lakes shipping with the Hudson River and the port of New York on the Atlantic Ocean. Several towns and villages developed along the canal, as it carried much trade and passenger traffic during its peak years. After the railroad was built through the state, along the same river plain, it superseded the canal, which was filled in some areas.

At the time of the canal's construction, Montgomery County was the only place where there was a break in the Appalachian Mountains. Called 'The Noses' because of canal construction, it became known as "the gateway to the West". In the mid-twentieth century, the NYS Thruway was constructed parallel to the former east–west routes of the canal and railroad. Today the Erie Canal and its lock system is used primarily for recreational boat use among locals and tourists.

Montgomery County is located in the heart of the state's Mohawk Valley region. Foothills of the Catskill Mountains dot the southern part of the county, while foothills of the Adirondack Mountains dot the north.

== Demographics ==
Historical population
Census	Pop.	Note	%±
1790	28,848		—
1800	22,051		−23.6%
1810	41,214		86.9%
1820	37,569		−8.8%
1830	43,715		16.4%
1840	35,818		−18.1%
1850	31,992		−10.7%
1860	30,866		−3.5%
1870	34,457		11.6%
1880	38,315		11.2%
1890	45,699		19.3%
1900	47,488		3.9%
1910	57,567		21.2%
1920	57,928		0.6%
1930	60,076		3.7%
1940	59,142		−1.6%
1950	59,594		0.8%
1960	57,240		−4.0%
1970	55,883		−2.4%
1980	53,439		−4.4%
1990	51,981		−2.7%
2000	49,708		−4.4%
2010	50,219		1.0%
2020	49,532		−1.4%
2025 (est.)	50,046	▲	1.0%
U.S. Decennial Census; 1790-1960 1900-90; 1990-2000 2010, 2020, 2025

Montgomery County population distribution by age and sex (2000 census)

As of the census of 2010, there were 50,208 people, 20,073 households, and 13,131 families residing in the county. The population density was 123 people per square mile (47 people/km^{2}). There were 22,522 housing units at an average density of 56 per square mile (22/km^{2}). The racial makeup of the county was 92.87% (83.8% Non-Hispanic; 9.07 White Hispanic) White, 1.15% African American, 0.25% Native American, 0.53% Asian, 0.01% Pacific Islander, 3.92% from other races, and 1.27% from two or more races. Hispanic or Latino of any race were 12.91% of the population. 19.0% identified as being of Italian, 15.9% German, 13.5% Polish, 9.8% Puerto Rican 9.1% Irish, 7.9% American and 6.4% English ancestry, according to Census 2010. 86.8% spoke English, 9.3% Spanish,1.8% Italian, and 1.1% Polish as their first language.

There were 20,038 households, out of which 29.40% had children under the age of 18 living with them, 49.00% were married couples living together, 11.60% had a female householder with no husband present, and 34.60% were non-families. 29.50% of all households were made up of individuals, and 14.90% had someone living alone who was 65 years of age or older. The average household size was 2.42 and the average family size was 2.98.

In the county, the population was spread out, with 24.50% under the age of 18, 7.20% from 18 to 24, 26.30% from 25 to 44, 22.90% from 45 to 64, and 19.20% who were 65 years of age or older. The median age was 40 years. For every 100 females there were 91.40 males. For every 100 females age 18 and over, there were 87.90 males.

The median income for a household in the county was $33,128, and the median income for a family was $40,688. Males had a median income of $31,818 versus $23,359 for females. The per capita income for the county was $17,005. About 9.00% of families and 13.7% of the population were below the poverty line, including 17.80% of those under age 18 and 9.89% of those age 65 or over.

=== 2020 census ===
Montgomery County, New York – Racial and ethnic composition Note: the US Census treats Hispanic/Latino as an ethnic category. This table excludes Latinos from the racial categories and assigns them to a separate category. Hispanics/Latinos may be of any race.
Race / Ethnicity (NH = Non-Hispanic)	Pop 1980	Pop 1990	Pop 2000	Pop 2010	Pop 2020	% 1980	% 1990	% 2000	% 2010	% 2020
White alone (NH)	51,397	48,601	45,084	42,732	38,237	96.18%	93.50%	90.70%	85.09%	77.20%
Black or African American alone (NH)	194	343	457	712	987	0.36%	0.66%	0.92%	1.42%	1.99%
Native American or Alaska Native alone (NH)	65	90	93	103	83	0.12%	0.17%	0.19%	0.21%	0.17%
Asian alone (NH)	107	213	261	356	479	0.20%	0.41%	0.53%	0.71%	0.97%
Native Hawaiian or Pacific Islander alone (NH)	x	x	6	11	9	x	x	0.01%	0.02%	0.02%
Other race alone (NH)	86	31	20	53	210	0.16%	0.06%	0.04%	0.11%	0.42%
Mixed race or Multiracial (NH)	x	x	354	598	2,215	x	x	0.71%	1.19%	4.47%
Hispanic or Latino (any race)	1,590	2,703	3,433	5,654	7,312	2.98%	5.20%	6.91%	11.26%	14.76%
Total	53,439	51,981	49,708	50,219	49,532	100.00%	100.00%	100.00%	100.00%	100.00%

== Politics and government ==
In 2012, voters approved a county charter under New York's municipal home rule law which established an independent county executive to head its executive branch and replace the board of supervisors with a nine-seat county legislature. Elections were held the next year and the county began operating under this charter on January 1, 2014. As of 2024, the legislature has 8 Republicans and 1 Democrat.

County executives
Name	Party	Term
Matthew L. Ossenfort	Republican	January 1, 2014 – present

State Senate
District	Name	Party	Territory
46	Pat Fahy	Democratic	Entire county

State Assembly
District	Name	Party	Territory
111	Angelo Santabarbara	Democratic	Amsterdam (both city and town), Florida
118	Robert Smullen	Republican	Mohawk, Glen, Charleston, Root, Palatine, Canajoharie, Minden, St. Johnsville

U.S. House
District	Name	Party	Territory
NY-20	Paul Tonko	Democratic	Amsterdam (both city and town), Florida
NY-21	Elise Stefanik	Republican	Mohawk, Glen, Charleston, Root, Palatine, Canajoharie, Minden, St. Johnsville

United States presidential election results for Montgomery County, New York
Year	Republican / Whig		Democratic		Third party(ies)	
Year	No.	%	No.	%	No.	%
1840	2,828	46.13%	3,293	53.72%	9	0.15%
1844	2,849	45.86%	3,278	52.77%	85	1.37%
1848	2,924	50.15%	1,285	22.04%	1,621	27.80%
1852	2,995	46.73%	3,373	52.63%	41	0.64%
1856	3,076	49.03%	1,485	23.67%	1,713	27.30%
1860	3,528	52.03%	3,253	47.97%	0	0.00%
1864	3,519	47.38%	3,908	52.62%	0	0.00%
1868	3,981	51.10%	3,810	48.90%	0	0.00%
1872	4,113	52.28%	3,742	47.56%	13	0.17%
1876	4,457	48.19%	4,766	51.53%	26	0.28%
1880	5,230	51.21%	4,947	48.44%	35	0.34%
1884	5,505	49.59%	5,413	48.77%	182	1.64%
1888	6,365	52.18%	5,677	46.54%	156	1.28%
1892	5,727	48.38%	5,445	46.00%	665	5.62%
1896	7,082	58.39%	4,759	39.24%	288	2.37%
1900	7,302	57.35%	5,138	40.36%	292	2.29%
1904	7,444	57.29%	5,209	40.09%	340	2.62%
1908	7,571	57.02%	5,254	39.57%	453	3.41%
1912	5,040	42.00%	4,508	37.57%	2,451	20.43%
1916	6,704	54.57%	5,347	43.52%	234	1.90%
1920	12,835	66.07%	5,911	30.43%	679	3.50%
1924	12,869	63.20%	5,939	29.17%	1,554	7.63%
1928	15,257	60.28%	9,845	38.90%	207	0.82%
1932	14,104	54.09%	11,700	44.87%	272	1.04%
1936	14,127	48.48%	14,698	50.44%	314	1.08%
1940	15,546	50.71%	15,079	49.18%	34	0.11%
1944	14,726	50.45%	14,400	49.33%	63	0.22%
1948	14,212	48.90%	14,085	48.46%	767	2.64%
1952	19,554	60.13%	12,934	39.77%	31	0.10%
1956	20,678	67.41%	9,996	32.59%	0	0.00%
1960	14,837	48.13%	15,976	51.82%	14	0.05%
1964	8,471	30.40%	19,370	69.52%	20	0.07%
1968	12,566	49.75%	11,449	45.33%	1,242	4.92%
1972	16,640	63.58%	9,460	36.15%	71	0.27%
1976	13,281	53.70%	11,271	45.57%	182	0.74%
1980	11,917	49.48%	9,645	40.04%	2,524	10.48%
1984	14,398	61.22%	9,044	38.45%	78	0.33%
1988	11,128	49.05%	11,371	50.13%	186	0.82%
1992	8,802	37.55%	9,509	40.56%	5,132	21.89%
1996	7,172	33.88%	10,485	49.54%	3,509	16.58%
2000	9,765	46.93%	10,249	49.25%	795	3.82%
2004	11,338	53.43%	9,449	44.53%	434	2.05%
2008	10,711	53.09%	9,080	45.01%	384	1.90%
2012	9,334	51.33%	8,493	46.70%	359	1.97%
2016	11,301	59.31%	6,595	34.61%	1,158	6.08%
2020	12,745	60.22%	7,977	37.69%	442	2.09%
2024	13,286	63.91%	7,356	35.39%	146	0.70%

== Communities ==
=== Cities, villages, and census-designated places ===
#	Location	Population	Type
1	Amsterdam	18,219	City
2	Canajoharie	2,037	Village
3	Fort Plain	1,930	Village
4	St. Johnsville	1,643	Village
5	Hagaman	1,117	Village
6	Tribes Hill	937	CDP
7	Palatine Bridge	796	Village
8	Fultonville	742	Village
9	Fonda†	668	Village
10	Nelliston	555	Village
11	Ames	138	Village

† - County seat

=== Towns ===
- Amsterdam
- Canajoharie
- Charleston
- Florida
- Glen
- Minden
- Mohawk
- Palatine
- Root
- St. Johnsville

=== Hamlets ===
- Auriesville
- Fort Hunter
- Freysbush
- Minaville
- Sprakers
- Sprout Brook
- Valley Brook

== Notable people ==
- Joseph Brant (1743―1807), Mohawk Indian, was a Mohawk military and political leader who was closely associated with Great Britain during and after the American Revolution. He and his family were from Canajoharie, New York.
- Charles Couch (1833―1911), Wisconsin state legislator, was born in Mohawk in Montgomery County in 1833.
- Kirk Douglas (1916―2020), actor
- Bud Fowler (1858―1913), the first African American baseball player. He was born in Fort Plain, New York.
- Sheldon Jackson (1834―1909), Presbyterian missionary, was born in Minaville in Montgomery County in 1834.
- George A. Mitchell (1824―1878), founder of Cadillac, Michigan
- Rocco A. Petrone (1926-2006), Director Launch Operations at NASA's Kennedy Space Center (KSC) (1966-69) Apollo Program Director at NASA Headquarters (1969-73)
- David Pietrusza (1949― ), author
- John Shaw (1783―1871), businessman and early settler of the Midwestern United States, founder of St. Marie, Wisconsin.
- Cady Staley (1840―1928), 1st president of Case School of Applied Science (now Case Western Reserve University), was born in Minaville in Montgomery County in 1840.

== See also ==
- List of counties in New York
- National Register of Historic Places listings in Montgomery County, New York
- Fort Johnson Volunteer Fire Company
