= National Register of Historic Places listings in Schenectady County, New York =

Location of Schenectady County in New York

List of the National Register of Historic Places listings in Schenectady County, New York

This is intended to be a complete list of properties and districts listed on the National Register of Historic Places in Schenectady County, New York. The locations of National Register properties and districts (at least for all showing latitude and longitude coordinates below) may be seen in a map by clicking on "Map of all coordinates". Four of the sites are further designated U.S. National Historic Landmarks.

This National Park Service list is complete through NPS recent listings posted May 1, 2026.

Contents: Counties in New York
Albany (Albany) – Allegany – Bronx – Broome – Cattaraugus – Cayuga – Chautauqua – Chemung – Chenango – Clinton – Columbia – Cortland – Delaware – Dutchess (Poughkeepsie, Rhinebeck) – Erie (Buffalo) – Essex – Franklin – Fulton – Genesee – Greene – Hamilton – Herkimer – Jefferson – Kings – Lewis – Livingston – Madison – Monroe (Rochester) – Montgomery – Nassau – New York (Below 14th Street, 14th to 59th Streets, 59th to 110th Streets, Above 110th Street, Islands) – Niagara (Niagara Falls) – Oneida – Onondaga (Syracuse) – Ontario – Orange – Orleans – Oswego – Otsego – Putnam – Queens – Rensselaer – Richmond – Rockland – St. Lawrence – Saratoga – Schenectady – Schoharie – Schuyler – Seneca – Steuben – Suffolk – Sullivan – Tioga – Tompkins – Ulster – Warren – Washington – Wayne – Westchester (Northern, Southern, New Rochelle, Peekskill, Yonkers) – Wyoming – Yates

== Listings county-wide ==
	Name on the Register	Image	Date listed	Location	City or town	Description
1	Abrahams Farmhouse		October 11, 1984 (#84003092)	Hardin Rd. 42°48′30″N 74°11′25″W	Duanesburg	
2	Alexandra Apartment Hotel		August 8, 2019 (#100004246)	1-3 State Street; 42°48′55″N 73°56′57″W	Schenectady	1900 long-term residence built in Queen Anne Style for workers at nearby GE facility
3	Avery Farmhouse		October 11, 1984 (#84003106)	NY 30; 42°46′11″N 74°14′00″W	Duanesburg	
4	H. S. Barney Building		July 19, 1984 (#84002965)	217-229 State St. 42°48′55″N 73°56′44″W	Schenectady	
5	Becker Farmhouse		October 11, 1984 (#84003114)	Creek Rd. 42°45′07″N 74°15′43″W	Duanesburg	
6	Bishop Family Lustron House		March 6, 2008 (#08000144)	26 Slater Dr. 42°53′20″N 73°54′52″W	Glenville	
7	Joseph Braman House	Joseph Braman House	April 24, 1987 (#87000917)	Braman's Corners; 42°48′31″N 74°13′10″W	Duanesburg	
8	Brandywine Avenue School		December 9, 1999 (#99001491)	108 Brandywine Ave. 42°48′08″N 73°55′29″W	Schenectady	Destroyed by fire in November 2007
9	George Washington Carver Community Center		October 16, 2020 (#100005677)	700 Craig St. 42°48′09″N 73°56′16″W	Schenectady	
10	Central Fire Station		April 11, 1985 (#85000729)	Erie Blvd. 42°48′48″N 73°56′47″W	Schenectady	
11	Chadwick Farmhouse		October 11, 1984 (#84003175)	Schoharie Tpk. 42°44′17″N 74°10′16″W	Duanesburg	
12	Chapman Farmhouse	Chapman Farmhouse	October 11, 1984 (#84003176)	Miller's Corners Rd. 42°48′44″N 74°13′16″W	Duanesburg	
13	Christ Episcopal Church	Christ Episcopal Church	April 24, 1987 (#87000911)	NY 20; 42°46′07″N 74°09′17″W	Duanesburg	
14	Christman Bird and Wildlife Sanctuary	Christman Bird and Wildlife Sanctuary	August 25, 1970 (#70000433)	Schoharie Tpke. 42°44′27″N 74°07′30″W	Delanson	
15	Clark Witbeck Co. Warehouse		July 31, 2023 (#100009168)	132-136 Broadway; 42°48′50″N 73°56′32″W	Schenectady	
16	Delanson Historic District	Delanson Historic District	October 11, 1984 (#84003181)	Main St. 42°44′35″N 74°11′16″W	Delanson	
17	Dellemont-Wemple Farm		October 25, 1973 (#73001266)	W of Schenectady on Wemple Rd. 42°46′16″N 74°00′30″W	Rotterdam	
18	Duane Mansion	Duane Mansion	April 24, 1987 (#87000910)	NY 20; 42°45′16″N 74°07′41″W	Duanesburg	
19	Duanesburg-Florida Baptist Church		October 11, 1984 (#84003185)	NY 30; 42°48′31″N 74°12′58″W	Duanesburg	
20	Eatons Corners Historic District		October 11, 1984 (#84003196)	Eatons Corners Rd. 42°48′21″N 74°14′50″W	Duanesburg	
21	Elmer Avenue School		November 21, 2022 (#100008387)	90 Elmer Ave. 42°48′37″N 73°55′17″W	Schenectady	
22	Enlarged Double Lock No. 23, Old Erie Canal	Enlarged Double Lock No. 23, Old Erie Canal	March 6, 2008 (#08000145)	Rice Rd. 42°49′25″N 73°59′13″W	Rotterdam	
23	Ferguson Farm Complex	Ferguson Farm Complex	April 24, 1987 (#87000913)	NY 20; 42°45′37″N 74°06′56″W	Duanesburg	
24	First Unitarian Society Church	First Unitarian Society Church	February 5, 2014 (#13001157)	1221 Wendell Ave. 42°48′57″N 73°55′28″W	Schenectady	Modernist Edward Durrell Stone church in GE Realty Plot district
25	Fitzgerald Building		May 19, 2021 (#100006517)	144-148 Clinton St. 42°48′45″N 73°56′24″W	Schenectady	
26	Foster Building	Foster Building	June 3, 1991 (#91000664)	508 State St. 42°48′42″N 73°56′27″W	Schenectady	First terra-cotta building in city, and first building to show influence of City Beautiful movement, when built in 1907
27	Franklin School		June 30, 1983 (#83001791)	Ave. B and Mason St. 42°49′23″N 73°55′21″W	Schenectady	
28	Gaige Homestead		October 11, 1984 (#84003202)	Weaver Rd. 42°44′53″N 74°09′09″W	Duanesburg	
29	General Electric Building 31		November 15, 2024 (#100010977)	112 Erie Boulevard; 42°48′42″N 73°56′57″W	Schenectady	
30	General Electric Building 32		March 5, 2025 (#100010978)	108 Erie Boulevard; 42°48′42″N 73°56′58″W	Schenectady	
31	General Electric Realty Plot	General Electric Realty Plot	November 18, 1980 (#80002763)	Roughly bounded by Oxford Pl., Union Ave., Nott St., Lenox and Lowell Rds. 42°49′01″N 73°55′14″W	Schenectady	Former Union College property bought by GE in late 19th century for executives and researchers to build upscale homes on.
32	General Electric Research Laboratory	General Electric Research Laboratory	May 15, 1975 (#75001227)	General Electric main plant 42°48′39″N 73°57′06″W	Schenectady	First research laboratory established by an American corporation
33	Gilbert Farmhouse		October 11, 1984 (#84003207)	Thousand Acre Rd. 42°44′30″N 74°14′38″W	Duanesburg	
34	Abraham Glen House	Abraham Glen House	July 14, 2004 (#04000708)	Mohawk Ave. 42°49′27″N 73°57′35″W	Scotia	Rare Dutch heavy timber frame house, built in 1730s, is now Scotia's branch of the county public library
35	Glenville District No. 5 Schoolhouse		May 19, 2014 (#14000226)	2140 Potter Rd. 42°56′22″N 74°04′53″W	Glenville	
36	Joseph Green Farmhouse		October 11, 1984 (#84003209)	NY 159; 42°49′43″N 74°10′43″W	Duanesburg	
37	Halladay Farmhouse		October 11, 1984 (#84003213)	US 20; 42°45′59″N 74°12′49″W	Duanesburg	
38	Hawes Homestead		October 11, 1984 (#84003217)	Herrick Rd. 42°47′35″N 74°12′39″W	Duanesburg	
39	Hotel Van Curler	Hotel Van Curler	September 12, 1985 (#85002277)	78 Washington Ave. 42°48′54″N 73°56′58″W	Schenectady	1925 building now Elston Hall of the Schenectady County Community College
40	Horace Mann School		November 24, 2015 (#15000824)	602 Craig St. 42°48′12″N 73°56′24″W	Schenectady	1908 school built to accommodate rising enrollment in a growing neighborhood
41	Howard Homestead		October 11, 1984 (#84003220)	McGuire School Rd. 42°46′39″N 74°13′44″W	Duanesburg	
42	Jenkins House	Jenkins House	October 11, 1984 (#84003071)	57 Main St. 42°44′46″N 74°11′19″W	Delanson	
43	Jenkins Octagon House	Jenkins Octagon House	October 11, 1984 (#84003227)	NY 395; 42°45′31″N 74°11′07″W	Duanesburg	
44	A.D. (Boss) Jones House	A.D. (Boss) Jones House	October 11, 1984 (#84003231)	McGuire School Rd. 42°46′20″N 74°12′53″W	Duanesburg	
45	George Westinghouse Jones House		September 15, 2004 (#04000998)	1944 Union St. 42°47′39″N 73°53′11″W	Niskayuna	
46	Ladd Farmhouse		October 11, 1984 (#84003238)	Dare Rd. 42°47′18″N 74°13′33″W	Duanesburg	
47	Irving Langmuir House	Irving Langmuir House	January 7, 1976 (#76001275)	1176 Stratford Rd. 42°48′58″N 73°55′09″W	Schenectady	Home of Irving Langmuir, 1932 Nobel laureate in chemistry and first industrial chemist so honored. During his career at GE, improved functioning of light bulb, developed concentric model of atom, co-developed cloud seeding and was among first scientists to work with plasmas.
48	George Lasher House		October 11, 1984 (#84003242)	Levey Rd. 42°50′11″N 74°09′16″W	Duanesburg	
49	Alexander Liddle Farmhouse		October 11, 1984 (#84003256)	Gamsey Rd. 42°46′42″N 74°12′26″W	Duanesburg	
50	Robert Liddle Farmhouse		October 11, 1984 (#84003265)	Little Dale Farm Rd. 42°46′34″N 74°07′21″W	Duanesburg	
51	Thomas Liddle Farm Complex		October 11, 1984 (#84003247)	Eaton Corners Rd. 42°47′51″N 74°14′23″W	Duanesburg	
52	Mabee House	Mabee House	May 22, 1978 (#78001907)	S of Rotterdam Junction on NY 5S; 42°51′56″N 74°01′56″W	Rotterdam Junction	
53	Macomber Stone House		October 11, 1984 (#84003266)	Barton Hill Rd. 42°43′17″N 74°12′52″W	Duanesburg	
54	Mariaville Historic District	Mariaville Historic District	October 11, 1984 (#84003267)	NY 159; 42°49′42″N 74°08′08″W	Duanesburg	
55	Mica Insulator Company		January 4, 2012 (#11001007)	797 & 845 Broadway; 42°48′14″N 73°57′06″W	Schenectady	
56	New York State Barge Canal	New York State Barge Canal	October 15, 2014 (#14000860)	Linear across county 42°49′13″N 73°56′44″W	Schenectady, Glenville, Niskayuna, Rotterdam, Scotia	Successor to Erie Canal approved by state voters in early 20th century to compete with railroads
57	Niskayuna Railroad Station	Niskayuna Railroad Station	November 19, 2007 (#07001205)	N. side River Rd., Lyons Park; 42°46′47″N 73°49′25″W	Niskayuna	
58	Niskayuna Reformed Church	Niskayuna Reformed Church	April 18, 1979 (#79001628)	3041 Troy-Schenectady Rd. 42°46′34″N 73°49′56″W	Niskayuna	
59	North Mansion and Tenant House	North Mansion and Tenant House	April 24, 1987 (#87000909)	North Mansion Rd. 42°45′13″N 74°06′52″W	Duanesburg	
60	Nott Memorial Hall	Nott Memorial Hall	May 5, 1972 (#72000912)	Union College campus 42°49′02″N 73°55′49″W	Schenectady	16-sided domed building at center of campus considered fine example of Victorian Gothic. Has had many uses over years; completely restored in 1990s.
61	Nott Street School		December 29, 2011 (#11000970)	487 Nott St. 42°49′14″N 73°55′52″W	Schenectady	
62	F. F. Proctor Theatre and Arcade	F. F. Proctor Theatre and Arcade	October 4, 1979 (#79003237)	432 State St. 42°48′44″N 73°56′31″W	Schenectady	1926 theater recently renovated. One of the most lavish in nation when built; hosted first public demonstration of television in 1930.
63	Quaker Street Historic District	Quaker Street Historic District	October 11, 1984 (#84003270)	Schoharie Tpk., Gallupville and Darby Hill Rds. 42°44′01″N 74°11′16″W	Duanesburg	
64	Reformed Presbyterian Church Parsonage		October 11, 1984 (#84003271)	Duanesburg Churches Rd. 42°46′16″N 74°09′26″W	Duanesburg	
65	Rosendale Common School		July 19, 2010 (#10000482)	2572 Rosendale Rd. 42°47′46″N 73°51′31″W	Niskayuna vicinity	
66	St. George's Lodge No. 6 Masonic Temple and Club		May 28, 2025 (#100011892)	302 State Street; 42°48′50″N 73°56′38″W	Schenectady	
67	Schenectady Armory	Schenectady Armory	March 2, 1995 (#95000087)	125 Washington Ave. 42°48′48″N 73°56′58″W	Schenectady	Intact 1936 Art Deco armory, unusually located in center (at the time) of city rather than outskirts
68	Schenectady City Hall and Post Office	Schenectady City Hall and Post Office	October 11, 1978 (#78001908)	Jay St. 42°48′51″N 73°56′22″W	Schenectady	1931 McKim, Mead and White building with window arches matching nearby post office
69	Schenectady Police Department		August 5, 2022 (#100007961)	301 Clinton St. 42°48′40″N 73°56′32″W	Schenectady	
70	Schenectady Public Market and Scale House		January 27, 2022 (#100007377)	Bounded by Clinton St., Van Guysling Ave., Broadway, and Hamilton St. 42°48′36″N 73°56′42″W	Schenectady	
71	Schenectady Savings Bank		March 16, 2022 (#100007378)	500 State St. 42°48′43″N 73°56′26″W	Schenectady	
72	Seeley Farmhouse		May 23, 1978 (#78001909)	2 Freeman's Bridge Rd. 42°49′54″N 73°55′50″W	Glenville	
73	Sheldon Farmhouse		October 11, 1984 (#84003273)	NY 7; 42°43′27″N 74°15′20″W	Duanesburg	
74	Shute Octagon House	Shute Octagon House	October 11, 1984 (#84003276)	McGuire School Rd. 42°46′28″N 74°13′10″W	Duanesburg	
75	St. Columba's School		December 1, 2015 (#15000853)	400 Craig St. 42°48′19″N 73°56′18″W	Schenectady	1923 school was central to city's Irish Catholic population
76	St. Mary's Catholic Church Complex		June 12, 2017 (#100001071)	820-828 Eastern Ave. & 104 Irving St. 42°48′41″N 73°55′41″W	Schenectady vicinity	Stone church and several other buildings erected in early 20th century to serve the city's growing Polish immigrant population remained in use until 2009
77	Stockade Historic District	Stockade Historic District	April 3, 1973 (#73001267)	Roughly bounded by Mohawk River, RR tracks, and Union St. 42°49′07″N 73°56′47″W	Schenectady	Oldest section of city, with many houses dating to 18th century
78	Swart House and Tavern		January 4, 2007 (#06001211)	130 Johnson Rd. 42°53′10″N 74°03′02″W	Glenville	
79	Union Street Historic District	Union Street Historic District	November 17, 1982 (#82001268)	Union St. from Hudson River to Phoenix Ave. 42°48′46″N 73°55′41″W	Schenectady	Intact 19th century development along main axis of city's expansion during that period.
80	US Post Office-Schenectady	US Post Office-Schenectady	May 11, 1989 (#88002429)	29 Jay St. 42°48′53″N 73°56′21″W	Schenectady	1912 neoclassical building added onto during Depression
81	US Post Office-Scotia Station	US Post Office-Scotia Station	May 11, 1989 (#88002430)	224 Mohawk Ave. 42°49′38″N 73°57′59″W	Scotia	Detailed Colonial Revival post office built 1939–40
82	Vale Cemetery and Vale Park	Vale Cemetery and Vale Park	September 24, 2004 (#04001053)	907 State St., Nott Terrace; 42°48′26″N 73°55′45″W	Schenectady	(Article on the combo of Vale Cemetery AND the park is needed)
83	Wedgeway Building	Wedgeway Building	June 17, 2022 (#100007805)	271-277 State St. 42°48′52″N 73°56′39″W	Schenectady	Originally the old Proctor's Theatre, which opened April 8, 1912 and closed in December 1926 when the new Proctor's Theatre opened at 432 State Street. Re-opened in April 1927 as Wedgeway Theatre and renamed Erie Theatre in September 1930.
84	Joseph Wing Farm Complex		October 11, 1984 (#84003279)	NY 30; 42°43′47″N 74°17′10″W	Duanesburg	
85	William R. Wing Farm Complex		October 11, 1984 (#84003281)	US 20; 42°45′52″N 74°14′15″W	Duanesburg	
86	Yates House		January 31, 2019 (#100003396)	133 Maple Ave. 42°51′31″N 73°54′29″W	Schenectady	
87	Young Men's Christian Association of Schenectady		December 1, 2015 (#15000854)	9–13 State St. 42°48′55″N 73°57′03″W	Schenectady	1928 building dates to first national spurt of YMCA growth

== See also ==
- National Register of Historic Places listings in New York
