= United States Post Office (Scotia, New York) =

- U.S. Post Office
- U.S. National Register of Historic Places
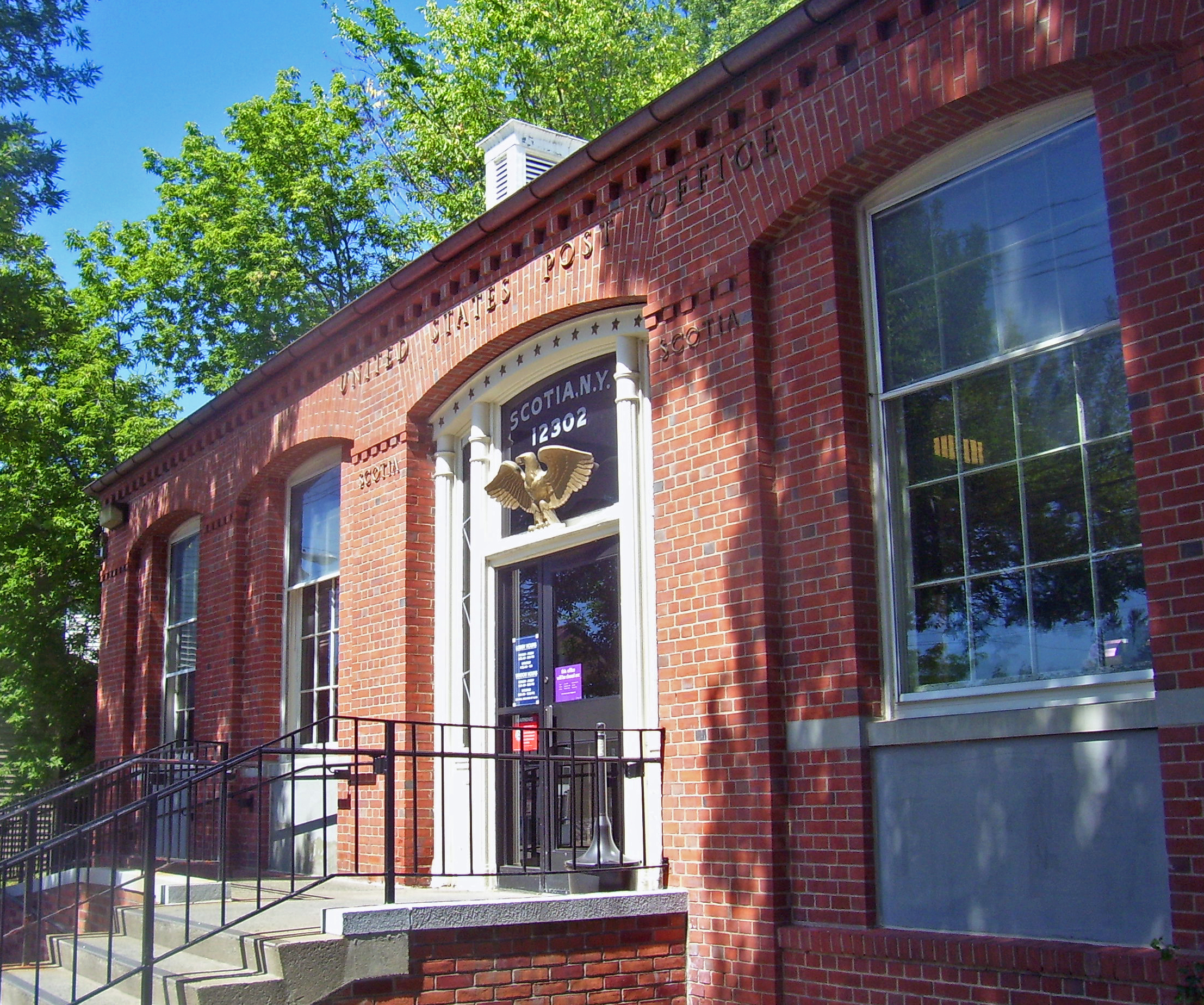
- West elevation, 2008

- Location within New York Location within the United States
- Location: Scotia, NY
- Nearest city: Schenectady
- Coordinates: 42°49′38″N 73°57′58″W
- Built: 1939–40
- Architect: Louis A. Simon
- Architectural style: Colonial Revival
- MPS: U.S. Post Offices in New York State, 1858–1943, TR
- NRHP reference No.: 88002430
- Added to NRHP: 1989

The U.S. Post Office in Scotia, New York, is located on Mohawk Avenue (NY 5) in the middle of the village. It is a brick Colonial Revival structure built at the end of the 1930s, serving the 12302 ZIP Code, which covers the village and some surrounding areas of the Town of Glenville.

It is one of five nearly identical post office buildings across the state, all featuring elaborate detail and decoration. In the lobby a mural depicts a 1690 confrontation between Native Americans and an early settler family. In 1989 it was listed on the National Register of Historic Places. In 2009 the Postal Service announced that it was considering closing it down, sparking a community effort to save it.

== Building ==
The post office occupies a small lot at the western corner of Mohawk and Center Street. The neighborhood, the village's downtown, is a mix of small commercial and residential structures. To the building's west is a house; to its north a parking lot. It is set back slightly from the street, with landscaping and plantings in front.

The building itself is a one-story, five-by-five-bay steel frame building on a poured concrete foundation faced in brick laid in English bond with a hipped slate roof pierced by two zinc-coated ventilators. The hipping is lower over the three central bays on the rear; a one-bay loading dock projects from that area.

A molded brick watercourse sets off the basement, and the roofline is marked by a corbeled course giving the effect of a denticulated cornice. The western (front) facade is symmetrically composed around a centrally located, recessed segmented arch with a lintel of radiating voussoirs. A carved metal eagle is situated above the door in front of the transom. A row of stars is set in the arch above, and "SCOTIA, N.Y. 12302" is etched on the glass in the transom. Metal lettering saying "UNITED STATES POST OFFICE" is above the door, with "SCOTIA" on either side.

The windows on all facades are similarly shaped and decorated. Small brick corbels between the window openings suggest brick piers with denticulated capitals, and the recessing and arching of the windows combines with this to suggest an arcade.

Concrete steps with modern railings rise to the entrance, with a recently added wheelchair ramp coming in from the north. The original lampposts have been mounted on separate pedestals. The modern aluminum and glass door leads into a wooden vestibule with fluted pilasters and a curved ceiling.

The lobby itself takes up four of the five bays of the façade, with the postmaster's office occupying the building's southeast corner. A modern plywood wall has been built on the west with a partition and sliding doors further subdividing the space. New teller windows and Formica countertops have been added, but the original wooden customer tables remain. Also original are the finishings, from the terrazzo floor to the marble base and counter height dado that rise to a plaster ceiling with cornice. On the east wall is a mural, The Glen Family Spared by French Indians, above the door to the postmaster's office.

== History ==
As Scotia grew into a broom-making center during the 19th century, its postal needs were easily handled by a small building at what is now 109 Mohawk Street. In 1935, as a relief measure during the Depression, Congress authorized construction of the current building, replacing an old house and garage at the site.

Louis A. Simon, then Supervising Architect at the Treasury Department, handled the design, as he did for many of the other post offices built in New York during the 1930s. His design for Scotia's was almost identical to one used for four other post offices in small communities around the state: Akron, Horseheads, Middleburgh and Oxford. All are modestly scaled brick Colonial Revival buildings, showing no original variations save for minor later alterations.

Construction did not get underway until 1939, at a time when Congress was scaling back on new post office construction in anticipation of war. The local firm of Loucks and Clarks was awarded the contract and finished the building the following year, making it one of the last to be completed in the state under a Depression-era relief program. It was originally considered a branch of the post office in Schenectady to the southeast, hence its NRHP listing as "Scotia Station".

The next year, 1941, Buffalo artist Amy Jones painted the 5'6" by 12' (1.7 by 3.7 m) mural, depicting the sparing of the Glen family during the 1690 Schenectady massacre, a key turning point in the early history of Scotia. She had also painted a similar confrontation between early settlers and Indians for the Painted Post post office, and did at least one other postal mural, in Winsted, Connecticut.

In 2009 the U.S. Postal Service (USPS) announced Scotia was one of 600 local post offices around the country it was considering closing because of the difficult economy. The community rallied to persuade the USPS to keep it open, partly because of its historic status. The Schenectady County legislature passed a resolution to that effect, and its leader, Susan Savage, started an Internet petition along with two other legislators. The Postal Service has still not taken Scotia off the list of potential closures, as of September.

== See also ==
- National Register of Historic Places listings in Schenectady County, New York
