= Schenectady (disambiguation) =

Schenectady may stand for:

- Schenectady, New York
- Schenectady County, New York
- Schenectady County Airport
- Schenectady City Hall
- Schenectady Locomotive Works
