= Delanson Historic District =

Historic district in New York, United States

- U.S. National Register of Historic Places
- U.S. Historic district
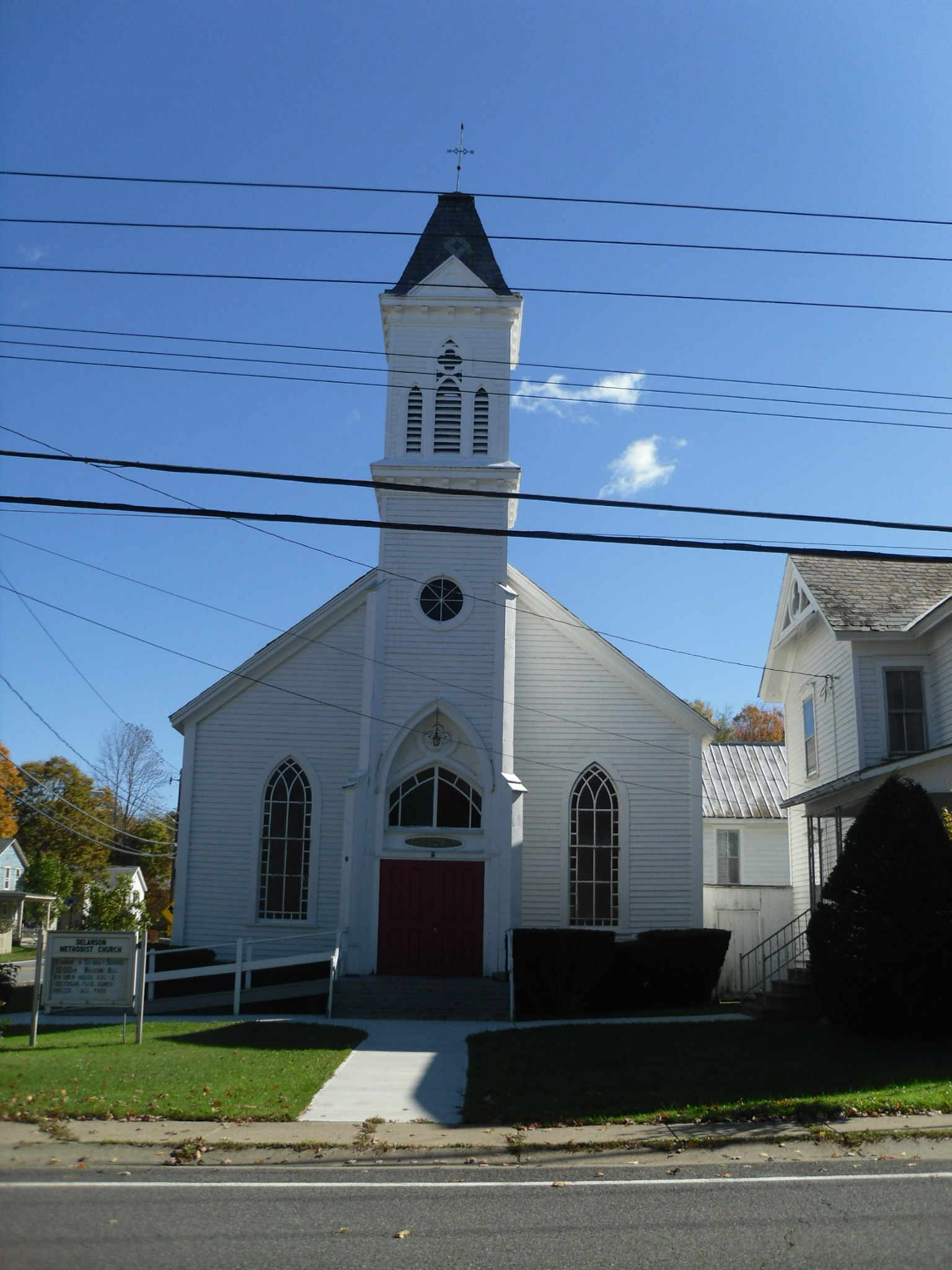
- Delanson Methodist Church, October 2010

- Location within New York Location within the United States
- Location: Main St., Delanson, New York
- Coordinates: 42°44′35″N 74°11′16″W
- Area: 11 acres (4.5 ha)
- Built: c. 1860–1890
- Architectural style: Late Victorian; Italianate
- MPS: Duanesburg MRA
- NRHP reference No.: 84003181
- Added to NRHP: October 11, 1984

Delanson Historic District is a 11-acre (4.5 ha) national historic district in Delanson, Schenectady County, New York. The district includes 31 contributing buildings on 19 properties. The buildings were built between about 1860 and 1890. They are primarily residential, with one church (Delanson Methodist Church) and one former commercial building. They are generally two story, frame structures with clapboard siding and include representative buildings of the Late Victorian and Italianate styles. A prime example of the Late Victorian style in Delanson can be seen in the Jenkins House, a home constructed in 1876 for the station master of the Delaware and Hudson Railroad.

It was listed on the National Register of Historic Places in 1984.

The district was described in a 1984 multiple resource study of Duanesburg properties. It is described as having been developed in a relatively rapid manner between 1860 and 1890.
