= United States Post Office (Akron, New York) =

- US Post Office-Akron
- U.S. National Register of Historic Places
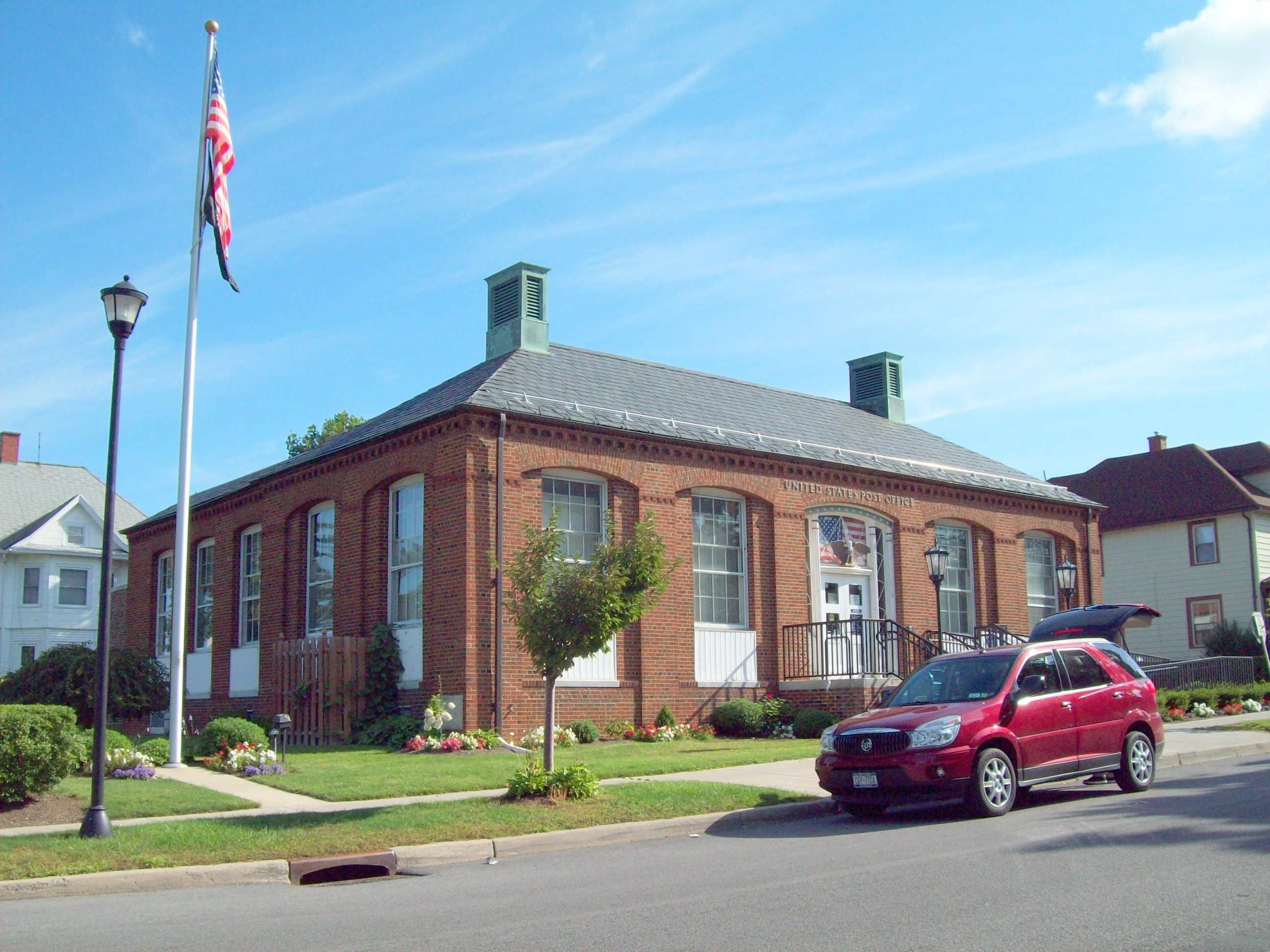
- U.S. Post Office, August 2010

- Location within New York Location within the United States
- Interactive map showing the location of the U.S. Post Office-Akron
- Location: 118 Main St., Akron, New York
- Coordinates: 43°1′13.1556″N 78°29′52.6416″W
- Built: 1939
- Architect: Simon, Louis A.; Logan, Elizabeth
- Architectural style: Colonial Revival
- MPS: US Post Offices in New York State, 1858-1943, TR
- NRHP reference No.: 88002449
- Added to NRHP: November 17, 1988

US Post Office—Akron is a historic post office building located at Akron, Erie County, New York. It was designed and built 1939–1940, and is one of a number of post offices in New York State designed by the Office of the Supervising Architect of the Treasury Department, Louis A. Simon. It was completed in December 1940 as the result of residents requesting it from Congressman Alfred Beiter. The building is in the Colonial Revival style and is virtually identical to the post offices at Scotia, Oxford, Middleburgh, and Horseheads. The interior features a mural by Elizabeth Logan painted in 1941 and titled Horse-Drawn Railroad.

When it opened on December 30, 1940, the Akron News reported that, "As you enter the stately stairway to the entrance of the new postoffice you have a certain sense of solidness and rigidity. The brass trimmed doors lend an atmosphere of a Government building."

It was listed on the National Register of Historic Places in 1989.
