= Alexander Delos "Boss" Jones =

American architect

- Born: August 10, 1818 probably Columbia County, New York
- Died: May 15, 1897 (aged 78)
- Occupation: Architect
- Spouse: Mary Liddle (January 20, 1848)
- Projects: Greek Revival style farmhouses and Octagon houses

Alexander Delos "Boss" Jones (1818–1897), also known as A.D. (Boss) Jones or Boss Jones, was an American master carpenter and architect who designed and built a number of notable Greek Revival style farmhouses in Schenectady County, New York. He also built two notable Octagon houses. His work was based in Duanesburg, New York. Some of his buildings employed innovative stacked plank construction. Eight of his notable works were covered in a study of Boss Jones Thematic Resources and listed on the National Register of Historic Places in 1984.

== Selected works ==
- Avery Farmhouse, c. 1850
- Becker Farmhouse, c. 1850
- Alexander Liddle Farmhouse, c. 1850
- Robert Liddle Farmhouse, c. 1850
- Jenkins Octagon House, c. 1855
- Ladd Farmhouse, c. 1855
- Shute Octagon House, c. 1855
- A.D. (Boss) Jones House, c. 1860
