= Joseph Wing Farm Complex =

Historic house in New York, United States

- U.S. National Register of Historic Places
- Location within New York Location within the United States
- Location: NY 30, Duanesburg, New York
- Coordinates: 42°43′47″N 74°17′10″W
- Area: 106 acres (43 ha)
- Built: ca. 1820
- Architectural style: Federal, Vernacular Federal
- MPS: Duanesburg MRA
- NRHP reference No.: 84003279
- Added to NRHP: October 11, 1984

Joseph Wing Farm Complex is a historic home and farm complex located at Duanesburg in Schenectady County, New York. The farmhouse was built about 1820 and is a 1 1/2-story, five-bay frame building on a limestone foundation in a vernacular Federal style. It has a gable roof, is sheathed in clapboard, and has a 1 1/2-story rear wing. Also on the property are four contributing barns and three sheds.

The property was covered in a 1984 study of Duanesburg historical resources. It was listed on the National Register of Historic Places in 1984.
