= Robert Liddle Farmhouse =

Historic house in New York, United States

- U.S. National Register of Historic Places
- Location within New York Location within the United States
- Location: Little Dale Farm Rd., Duanesburg, New York
- Coordinates: 42°46′34″N 74°7′21″W
- Area: 111.5 acres (45.1 ha)
- Built: c. 1850
- Architect: Jones, Alexander Delos (Boss)
- Architectural style: Greek Revival
- MPS: Duanesburg MRA
- NRHP reference No.: 84003265
- Added to NRHP: October 11, 1984

Robert Liddle Farmhouse is a historic home located at Duanesburg in Schenectady County, New York. It was built about 1850 by noted master carpenter Alexander Delos "Boss" Jones. It is a 2-story, three-bay, clapboard-sided frame farmhouse in the Greek Revival style. It has a 1 1/2-story east wing with a hipped roof. It features a wide frieze and prominent corner pilasters. Also on the property are a contributing barn, a garage, a shed, and a machine shed.

The property was covered in a study of Boss Jones TR It was listed on the National Register of Historic Places in 1984.
