= Avery Farmhouse =

Historic house in New York, United States

- U.S. National Register of Historic Places
- Location within New York Location within the United States
- Location: NY 30, Duanesburg, New York
- Coordinates: 42°46′11″N 74°14′0″W
- Area: 203.4 acres (82.3 ha)
- Built: c. 1850
- Architect: Jones, Alexander Delos (Boss)
- Architectural style: Greek Revival
- MPS: Boss Jones TR
- NRHP reference No.: 84003106
- Added to NRHP: October 11, 1984

Avery Farmhouse is a historic home and farm complex located at Duanesburg in Schenectady County, New York. The house was built about 1850 by noted master carpenter Alexander Delos "Boss" Jones. It is a two-story, T-shaped, clapboard sided frame building in the Greek Revival style. The main block is flanked by two one-story frame wings. It features a giant pedimented portico supported by square columns. Contributing outbuildings include five silos, a garage, a large multi-component barn complex, and a barn.

The property was listed on the National Register of Historic Places in 1984.
