= Duane Mansion =

Historic house in New York, United States

- U.S. National Register of Historic Places
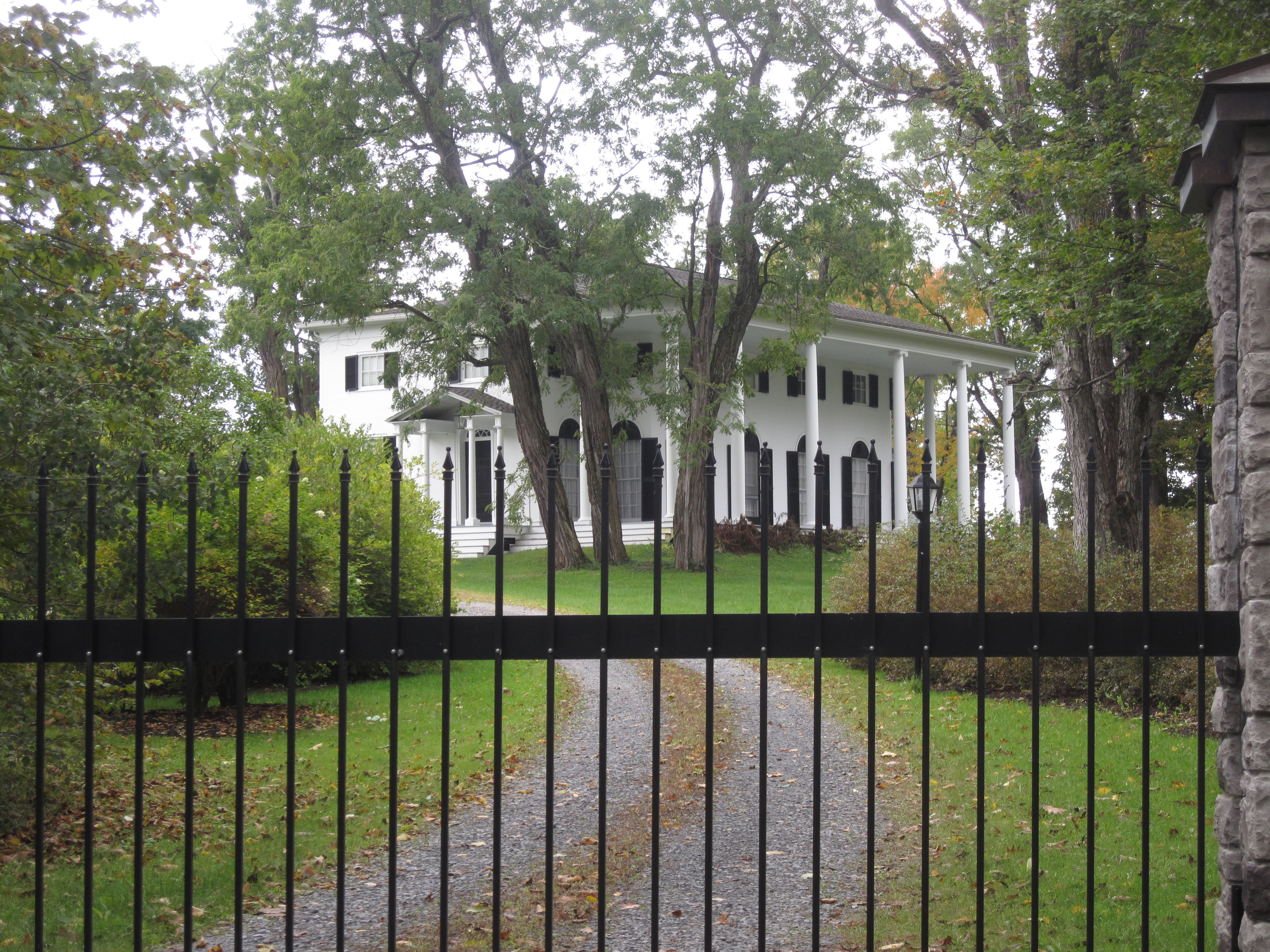
- Duane Mansion, September 2009

- Location within New York Location within the United States
- Interactive map showing the location of Duane Mansion
- Location: NY 20, Duanesburg, New York
- Coordinates: 42°45′16″N 74°7′41″W
- Area: 30 acres (12 ha)
- Built: c.1812
- Architect: Kelly, Solomon
- Architectural style: Federal
- MPS: Duanesburg MRA
- NRHP reference No.: 87000910
- Added to NRHP: April 24, 1987

Duane Mansion is a property in Duanesburg, New York, United States that was listed on the National Register of Historic Places in 1987.

It was built by Solomon Kelly sometime during the 1812 to 1816 period in fine Federal style.

Jacques Remee provided landscape architecture for formal gardens. Unfortunately no trace remains of these gardens.

Besides the mansion, the listing included three additional contributing buildings, one other contributing structure, and one non-constributing structure, on an area of 30 acres (12 ha). The additional buildings include an "outstanding" Federal style carriage barn, another single bay carriage house, a hay barn, a corn crib, and a shed.

The property was covered in a 1984 multiple resource area study of Duanesburg properties which provides much background on the Duane family. The study describes the mansion as "a squarish, two-story frame residence with a low hipped roof, prominent two-story piazza supported by Doric columns, round-topped floor length windows opening onto the piazza, and three identical entrances supported by gabled porches supported by slender Ionic columns. With its simply, symmetrical form and sophisticated detailing, it is a distinctive example of Federal design and an unusual rural interpretation of the Adamesque vocabulary." After further substantive review, the property was individually listed on the National Register in 1987.
