= Gilbert Farmhouse =

Historic house in New York, United States

- U.S. National Register of Historic Places
- Location within New York Location within the United States
- Location: Thousand Acre Rd., Duanesburg, New York
- Coordinates: 42°44′30″N 74°14′38″W
- Area: 6.2 acres (2.5 ha)
- Built: 1860
- MPS: Duanesburg MRA
- NRHP reference No.: 84003207
- Added to NRHP: October 11, 1984

Gilbert Homestead is a historic home located at Duanesburg in Schenectady County, New York. The house was built about 1860 and is a rectangular two story, four bay frame vernacular farmhouse. It has a gable roof, a central chimney, novelty siding, and slender corner pilasters. Also on the property are two contributing barns and two sheds.

The property was covered in a 1984 study of Duanesburg historical resources. It was listed on the National Register of Historic Places in 1984.
