= H. S. Barney Building =

Historic commercial building in New York, United States

- U.S. National Register of Historic Places
- Location within New York Location within the United States
- Location: 217-229 State St., Schenectady, New York
- Coordinates: 42°48′55″N 73°56′44″W
- Area: less than one acre
- Built: 1873
- Architectural style: Classical Revival, Italianate, Commercial
- NRHP reference No.: 84002965
- Added to NRHP: July 19, 1984

H. S. Barney Building is a historic department store complex located at Schenectady in Schenectady County, New York. The large commercial building consists of six sections constructed or acquired and linked between 1873 and 1923. It is predominantly brick in construction, but incorporates heavy timber framing, concrete, and limestone. A facade erected in 1923 in the Commercial style, helped to unify the complex. It ceased use as a department store in 1973.

It was added to the National Register of Historic Places on July 19, 1984.
