= A. D. (Boss) Jones House =

Historic house in New York, United States

- U.S. National Register of Historic Places
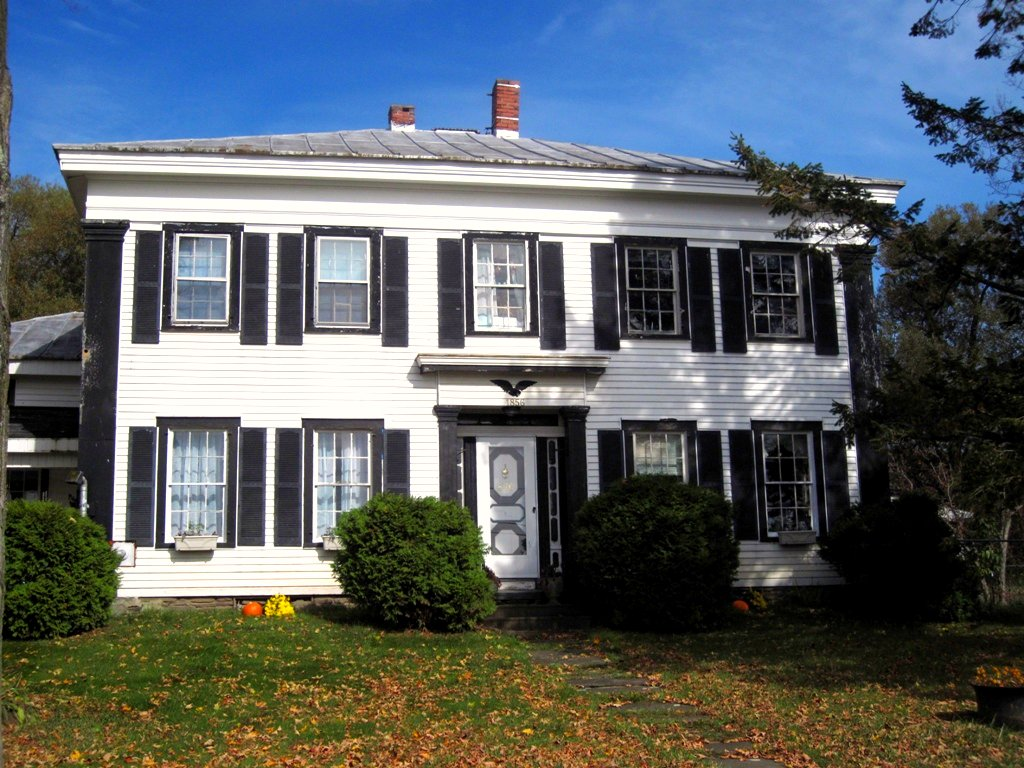
- Boss Jones House, October 2009

- Location within New York Location within the United States
- Interactive map showing the location for A.D. Boss (Jones) House
- Location: McGuire School Rd., Duanesburg, New York
- Coordinates: 42°46′20″N 74°12′53″W
- Area: 104.1 acres (42.1 ha)
- Built: c. 1860
- Architectural style: Greek Revival, Italianate
- MPS: Boss Jones TR
- NRHP reference No.: 84003231
- Added to NRHP: October 11, 1984

A. D. (Boss) Jones House is a historic home located at Duanesburg in Schenectady County, New York. It was built about 1860 by noted master carpenter Alexander Delos "Boss" Jones. It is a two-story, five-bay frame farmhouse in a late-Greek Revival style with Italianate features. It features innovative stacked plank construction, a hipped roof, a wide frieze, and broad corner pilasters. Also on the property are two contributing barns and a shed.

The property was covered in a study of Boss Jones TR. It was listed on the National Register of Historic Places in 1984.
