= Christman Bird and Wildlife Sanctuary =

- U.S. National Register of Historic Places
- U.S. Historic district
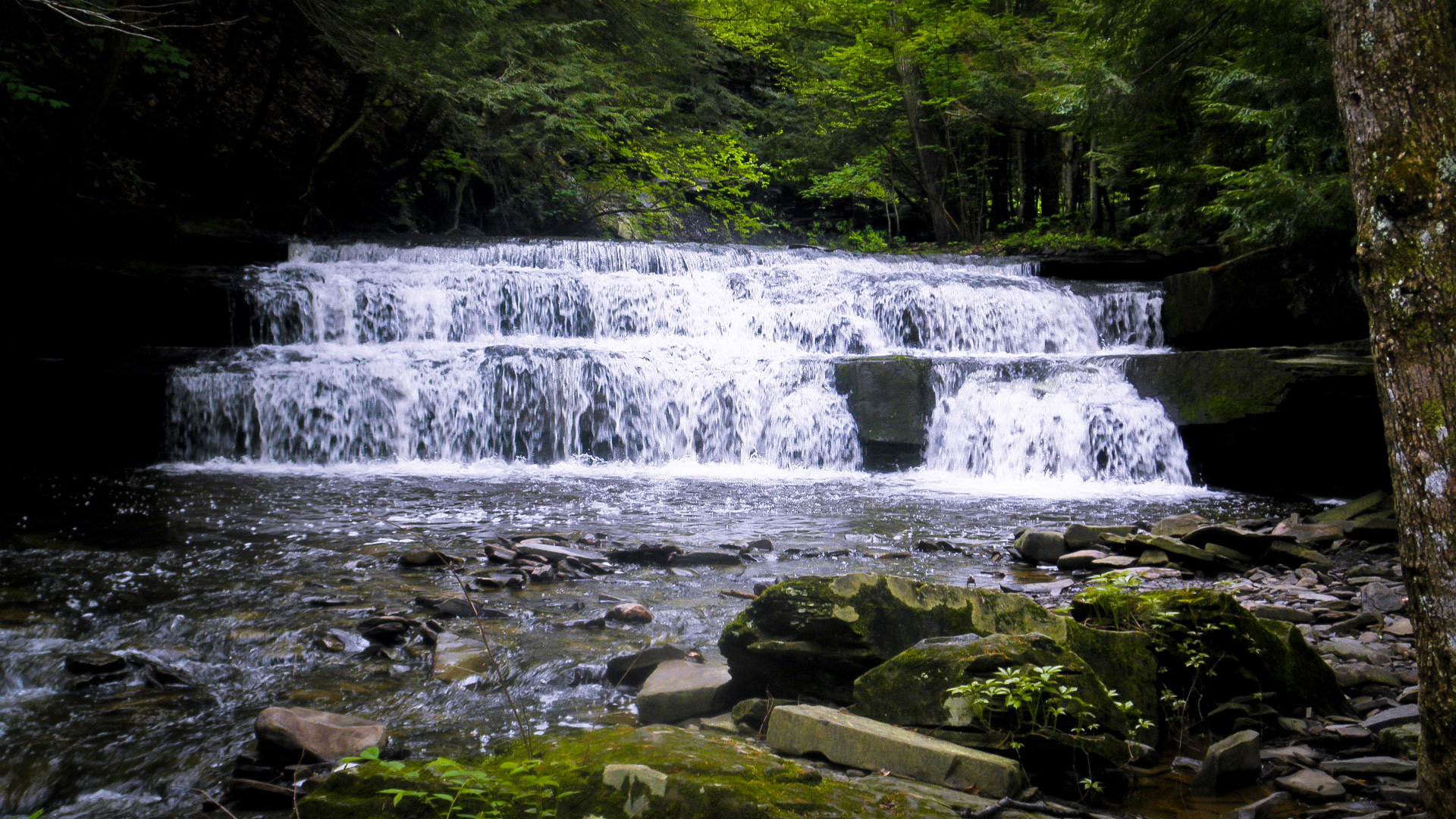
- The first waterfall encountered on the trail, around 0.8 miles (1.3 km) in.

- Location within New York Location within the United States
- Location: Schoharie Tpke., Delanson, New York
- Coordinates: 42°44′27″N 74°7′30″W
- Area: 105 acres (42 ha)
- Built: 1888
- NRHP reference No.: 70000433
- Added to NRHP: August 25, 1970

Christman Bird and Wildlife Sanctuary is a national historic district located near Delanson, Schenectady County, New York. The district includes six contributing buildings and one contributing structure on a largely wooded, rural 105-acre (42 ha) tract. It lies in the valley of the Bozenkill and includes a 30-foot (9.1 m) waterfall along the Helderberg Escarpment. Located on the property is a two-story frame dwelling built in 1868, a stone dairy house, barns, large stone walls, and an open lean-to built by the Mohawk Valley Hiking Club. The sanctuary had its beginnings in 1888 when property owner W.W. Christman (1865-1937) and his wife, the former Catherine Bradt, began a winter bird feeding program during the great blizzard of that year.

It was listed on the National Register of Historic Places in 1970.

== Gallery ==
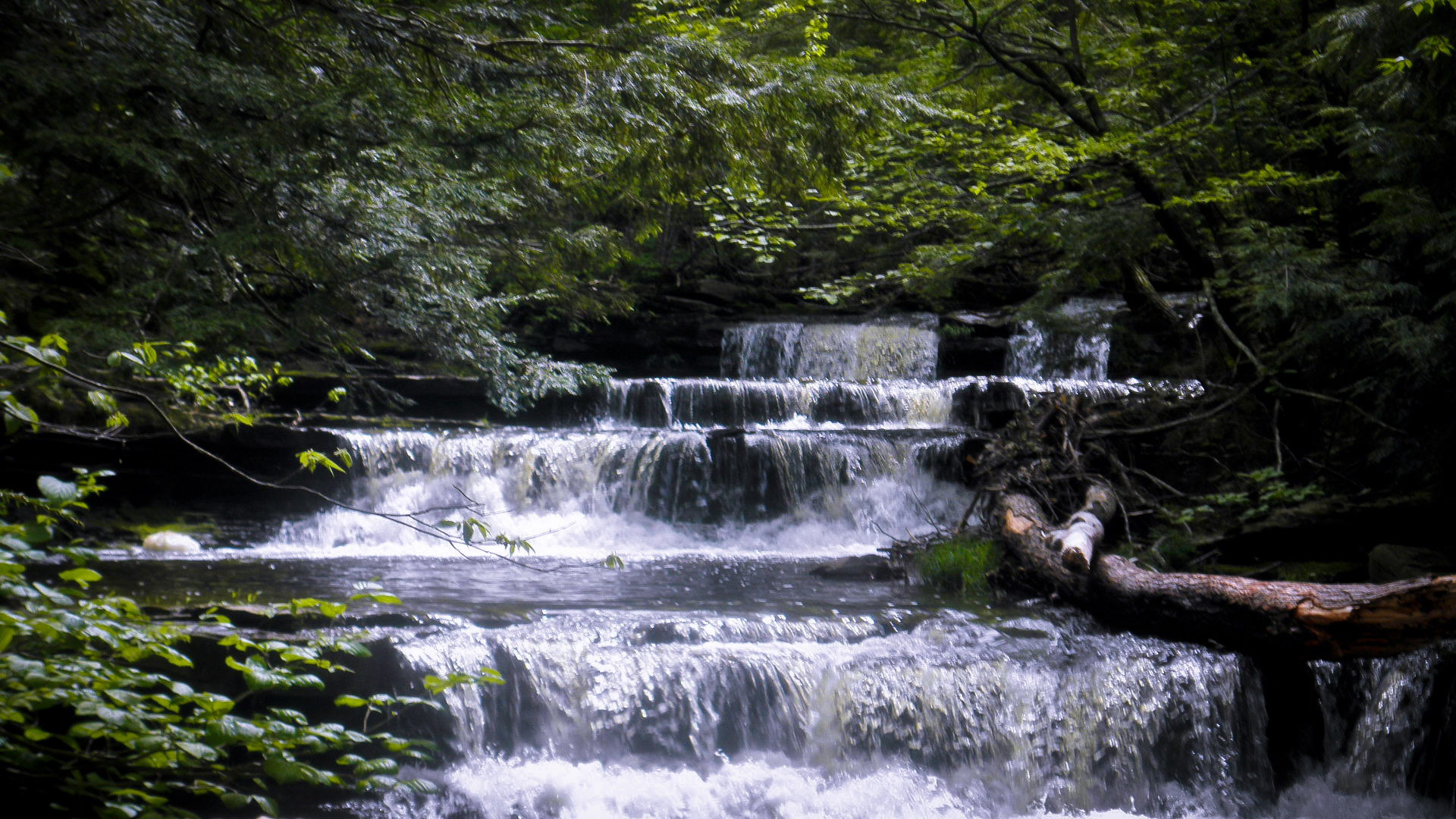
Following the stream along the trail, around 1.3 miles (2.1 km) in.

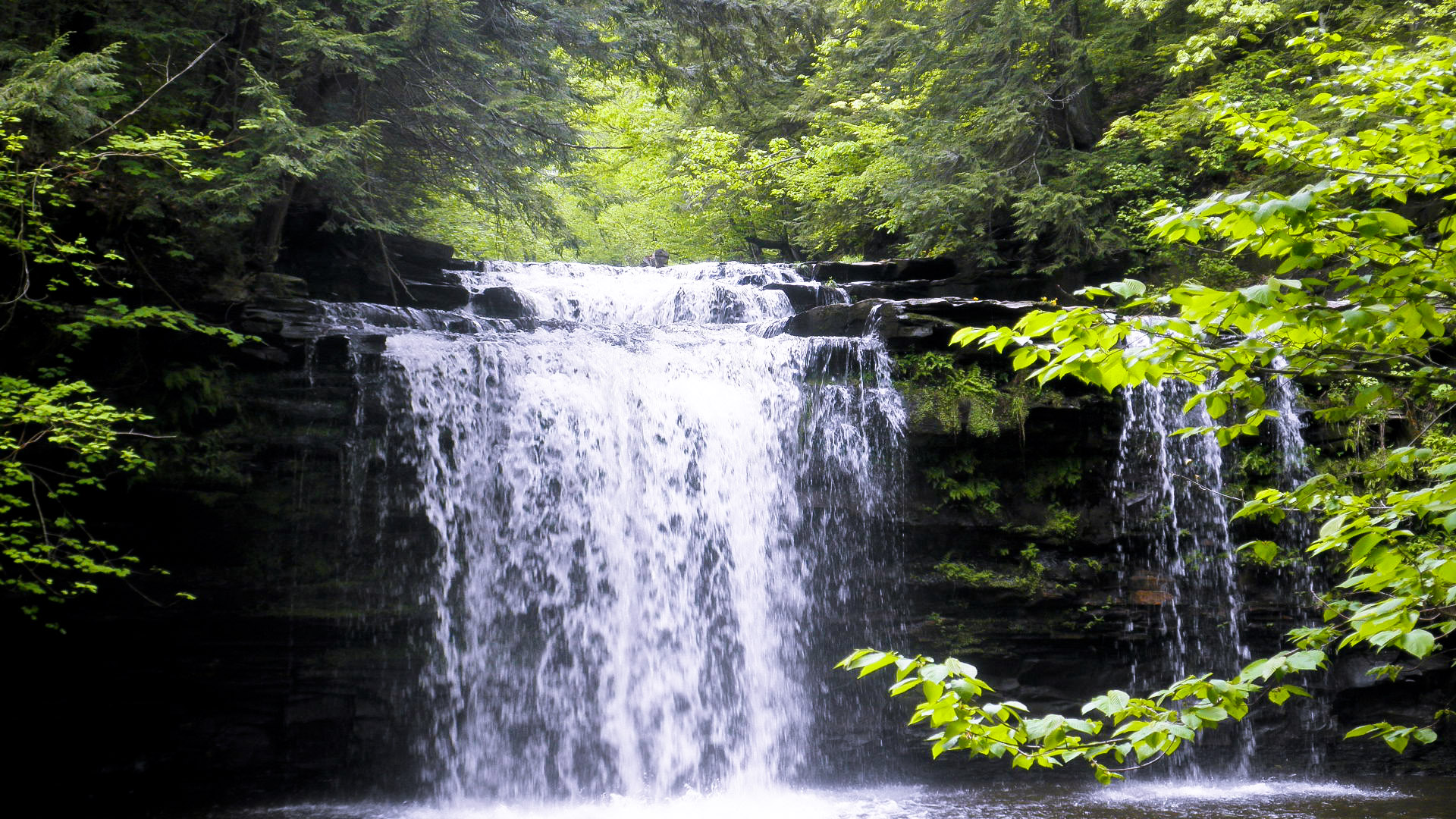
The main waterfall, about 1 mile (1.6 km) along the trail.
