= St. Columba's School (Schenectady, New York) =

- U.S. National Register of Historic Places
- Location within New York Location within the United States
- Location: 400 Craig St., Schenectady, New York
- Coordinates: 42°48′19″N 73°56′16″W
- Area: 0.67 acres (0.27 ha)
- Built: 1923
- Architect: Walter H. van Guysling, M.L. & H. G. Emery
- Architectural style: Collegiate Gothic
- NRHP reference No.: 15000853
- Added to NRHP: December 1, 2015

St. Columba's School is a historic school building located at Schenectady, Schenectady County, New York. It was built in 1923, and is a three-story, reddish-brown brick building in the Collegiate Gothic style. It features white Indiana limestone buttress amortizements, pinnacles, and a crenellated parapet. The school closed in 1974, and since 1976 the building has housed the local Boys and Girls Club.

It was added to the National Register of Historic Places in 2015.
