= Eatons Corners Historic District =

Historic district in New York, United States

- U.S. National Register of Historic Places
- U.S. Historic district
- Location within New York Location within the United States
- Location: Eatons Corners Rd., Duanesburg, New York
- Coordinates: 42°48′21″N 74°14′50″W
- Area: 5 acres (2.0 ha)
- Built: 1800
- Architectural style: Greek Revival, Federal
- MPS: Duanesburg MRA
- NRHP reference No.: 84003196
- Added to NRHP: October 11, 1984

Eatons Corners Historic District is a national historic district located at Duanesburg in Schenectady County, New York. The district includes 11 contributing buildings on three properties. The properties are the Barlow Tavern, Brumley Homestead, and the Eaton Homestead. The three houses are two story frame buildings sheathed in clapboards. The Eaton Homestead was built about 1800 and Barlow Tavern in the 1820s; both are in the Federal style. The Brumley Homestead was built in the 1840s in the Greek Revival style.

The property was covered in a 1984 study of Duanesburg historical resources. It was listed on the National Register of Historic Places in 1984.
