= Franklin School (Schenectady, New York) =

- U.S. National Register of Historic Places
- Location within New York Location within the United States
- Location: Ave. B and Mason St., Schenectady, New York
- Coordinates: 42°49′23″N 73°55′21″W
- Area: 1.2 acres (0.49 ha)
- Built: 1907
- Architectural style: Colonial Revival, Georgian Revival
- NRHP reference No.: 83001791
- Added to NRHP: June 30, 1983

Franklin School is a historic school located at Schenectady in Schenectady County, New York. It was built in 1907 and is a two-story, red brick H-shaped institutional building in the Georgian Revival style. It is trimmed with yellow brick and stone. There are massive yellow brick pilasters at the corner of the pavilions and recessed rectangular panels. It operated as a school by the Schenectady City School District until 1974.

It was added to the National Register of Historic Places in 1983.

The building is identical to the former Horace Mann School, listed on the National Register of Historic Places in 2015.
