= Chadwick Farmhouse =

Historic house in New York, United States

- U.S. National Register of Historic Places
- Location within New York Location within the United States
- Location: Schoharie Tpk., Duanesburg, New York
- Coordinates: 42°44′17″N 74°10′16″W
- Area: 9.5 acres (3.8 ha)
- Built: 1870
- Architectural style: Late Victorian, Victorian Eclectic
- MPS: Duanesburg MRA
- NRHP reference No.: 84003175
- Added to NRHP: October 11, 1984

Chadwick Farmhouse is a historic home located at Duanesburg in Schenectady County, New York. It was built about 1870 and is a two-story, five bay frame building with picturesque, late-Victorian style eclectic features. It features a truncated hipped roof with prominent cross gables. Also on the property is a contributing dairy and springhouse.

The property was covered in a 1984 study of Duanesburg historical resources. It was listed on the National Register of Historic Places in 1984.
