= Ladd Farmhouse =

Historic house in New York, United States

- U.S. National Register of Historic Places
- Location within New York Location within the United States
- Location: Dare Rd., Duanesburg, New York
- Coordinates: 42°47′18″N 74°13′33″W
- Area: 137 acres (55 ha)
- Built: ca. 1855
- Architect: Jones, Alexander Delos (Boss)
- Architectural style: Greek Revival
- MPS: Boss Jones TR
- NRHP reference No.: 84003238
- Added to NRHP: October 11, 1984

Ladd Farmhouse is a historic home located at Duanesburg in Schenectady County, New York. It was built about 1855 by noted master carpenter Alexander Delos "Boss" Jones. It is a two-story, three-bay, clapboard sided frame farmhouse in the Greek Revival style. It features a gable roof, full entablature encircling the structure, exaggerated cornice returns, and broad corner pilasters. Also on the property are two contributing barns, a garage, and a shed.

The property was covered in a study of Boss Jones TR It was listed on the National Register of Historic Places in 1984.
