= Nott Street School =

- U.S. National Register of Historic Places
- Location within New York Location within the United States
- Location: 487 Nott St., Schenectady, New York
- Coordinates: 42°49′14″N 73°55′52″W
- Area: Less than 1 acre (0.40 ha)
- Built: 1877, 1909
- Architectural style: Late 19th and Early 20th Century Revivals
- NRHP reference No.: 11000970
- Added to NRHP: December 29, 2011

Nott Street School is a historic school building located at Schenectady, Schenectady County, New York. It was originally built in 1877 as a four-room school, with an eight classroom addition completed in 1909. It is a two-story, red brick building above a stone and concrete raised basement. The exterior has been painted since at least 1952. The building was used as a school until 1942, and has since been used for offices.

It was added to the National Register of Historic Places in 2011.
