= William R. Wing Farm Complex =

Historic house in New York, United States

- U.S. National Register of Historic Places
- Location within New York Location within the United States
- Location: US 20, Duanesburg, New York
- Coordinates: 42°45′52″N 74°14′15″W
- Area: 96 acres (39 ha)
- Built: 1836
- Architectural style: Greek Revival, Federal, Vernacular Federal
- MPS: Duanesburg MRA
- NRHP reference No.: 84003281
- Added to NRHP: October 11, 1984

William R. Wing Farm Complex is a historic home and farm complex located at Duanesburg in Schenectady County, New York. The farmhouse was built about 1836 and is a two-story, five bay frame building with late Federal / early Greek Revival vernacular design features. It has a gable roof, brick interior end chimneys, and a wide frieze pierced by full second story windows. Also on the property are two contributing barns.

The property was covered in a 1984 study of Duanesburg historical resources. It was listed on the National Register of Historic Places in 1984.
