= United States Post Office (Schenectady, New York) =

- U.S. Post Office
- U.S. National Register of Historic Places
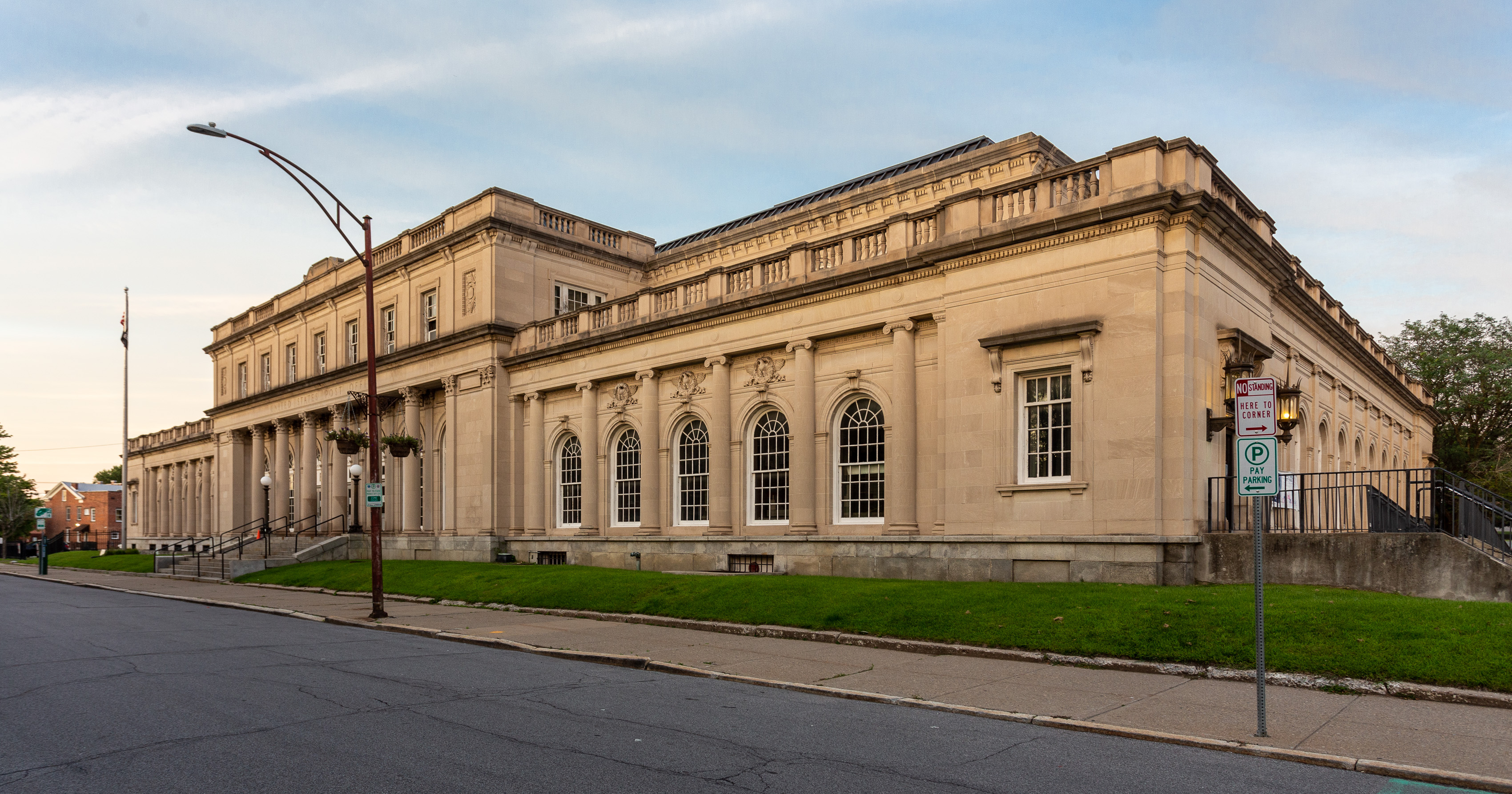

- Location within New York Location within the United States
- Interactive map showing the location for U.S. Post Office, Schenectady
- Location: 29 Jay St. Schenectady, NY
- Coordinates: 42°48′53″N 73°56′20″W
- Built: 1912
- Architect: James Knox Taylor, John Ryder
- Architectural style: Classical Revival
- MPS: US Post Offices in New York State, 1858-1943, TR
- NRHP reference No.: 88002429
- Added to NRHP: 1989

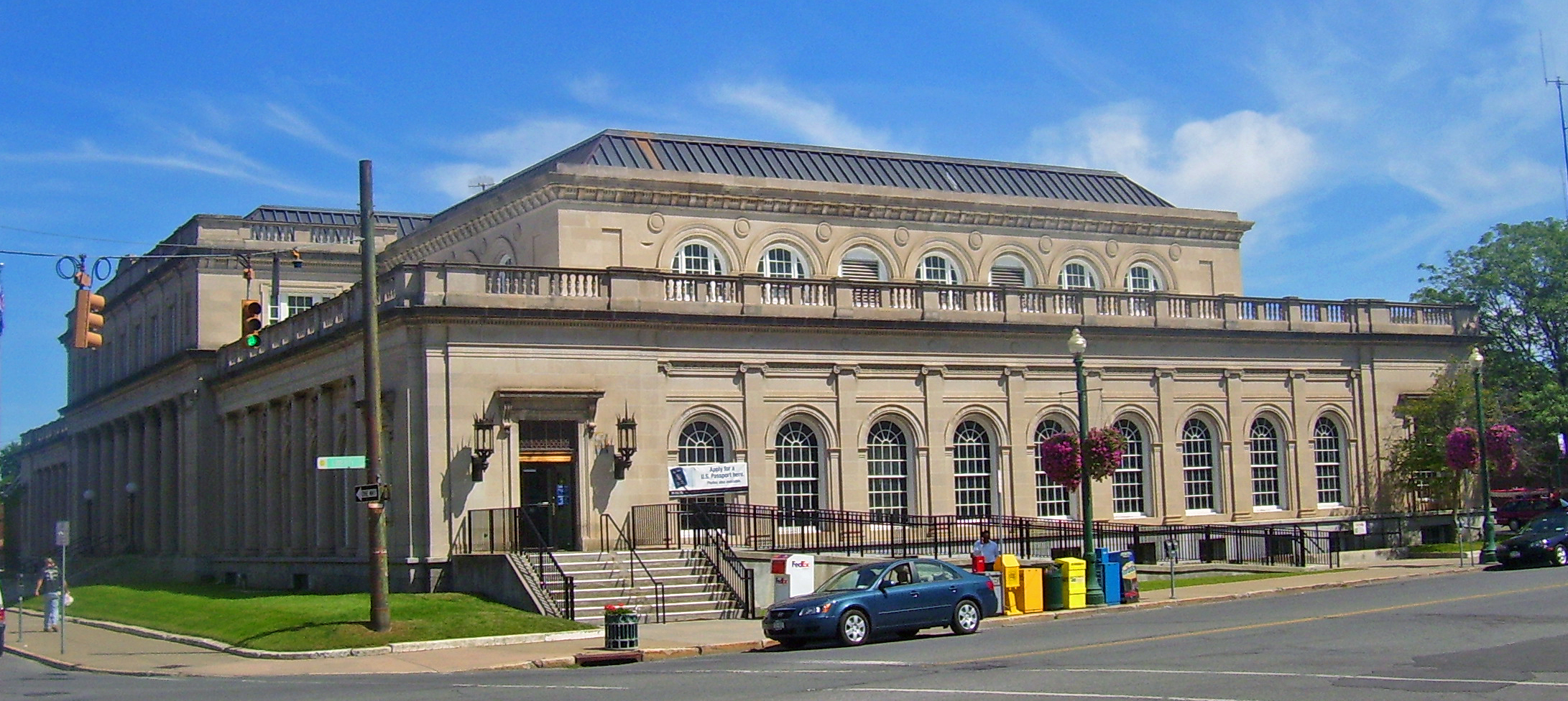
South elevation and west profile, 2008

The U.S. Post Office in Schenectady, in the U.S. state of New York, is located at Jay and Liberty streets just north of City Hall. It serves the 12305, 12307 and 12308 ZIP codes, which covers the city. It is a brick Classical Revival building erected in 1912 and added onto extensively in 1933. At that point in time its main entrance was moved to Jay Street.

Its detailing, particularly the arched windows, inspired a similar design for the neighboring city hall in 1931. The two buildings were later listed together on the National Register of Historic Places in 1978; in 1989 the post office was listed in its own right.

== Building ==
The post office occupies most of the block. The neighborhood is densely developed and commercial, with city and county government buildings as well. The terrain is flat.

It is a rectangular building faced limestone on the south and west and yellow brick elsewhere. A central pavilion is flanked by north and south wings, the latter of which is the main entrance. Both wings have round-arched windows divided by partially engaged Ionic columns. The former main entrance, on the Liberty Street side, has free-standing Corinthian columns. At the cornice is a balustrade.

Inside, the lobby has green marble baseboards, white marble wainscoting and a white marble stair with iron railing. The high plaster ceiling's molded cornice has dentils and modillions, with an eagle on each pilaster. Bronze mailboxes and oak woodwork round out the interior decoration.

== History ==
The first post office in Schenectady was established in 1793. It handled mail deliveries via stagecoach lines that passed through the city from Albany on their way west. Residents went to the post office to get their mail until home delivery began in 1887.

The post office had been in several locations until the current site was chosen in 1912, for a large post office for a growing industrial city. The use of the Classical Revival architectural style by Treasury Department supervising architect James Knox Taylor, while common for new post offices in cities Schenectady's size at the time, was unusual for the city. Only the county courthouse and a few small bank buildings used it.

In 1933 the Post Office decided to expand the structure, a move that expressed confidence in Schenectady's growth since postal receipts were declining at the time due to the Great Depression. John Ryder reconfigured the building with as little disruption to the original style as possible. The interior was renovated in the 1960s, the only significant change to the building since its construction.

== See also ==
- National Register of Historic Places listings in Schenectady County, New York
