= Alexander Liddle Farmhouse =

Historic house in New York, United States

- U.S. National Register of Historic Places
- Location within New York Location within the United States
- Location: Gamsey Rd., Duanesburg, New York
- Coordinates: 42°46′42″N 74°12′26″W
- Area: 122.5 acres (49.6 ha)
- Built: 1850
- Architect: Jones, Alexander Delos (Boss)
- Architectural style: Greek Revival
- MPS: Boss Jones TR
- NRHP reference No.: 84003256
- Added to NRHP: October 11, 1984

Alexander Liddle Farmhouse is a historic home located at Duanesburg in Schenectady County, New York. It was built about 1850 by noted master carpenter Alexander Delos "Boss" Jones. It is a two-story, asymmetrical T-shaped frame farmhouse in the Greek Revival style. It has a gable roof, clapboard siding, and features a wide entablature, pronounced cornice returns, and broad corner pilasters. Two one-story wings flank the main block. Also on the property are a contributing barn and garage.

The property was covered in a study of Boss Jones TR It was listed on the National Register of Historic Places in 1984.
