= Ferguson Farm Complex =

Historic house in New York, United States

- U.S. National Register of Historic Places
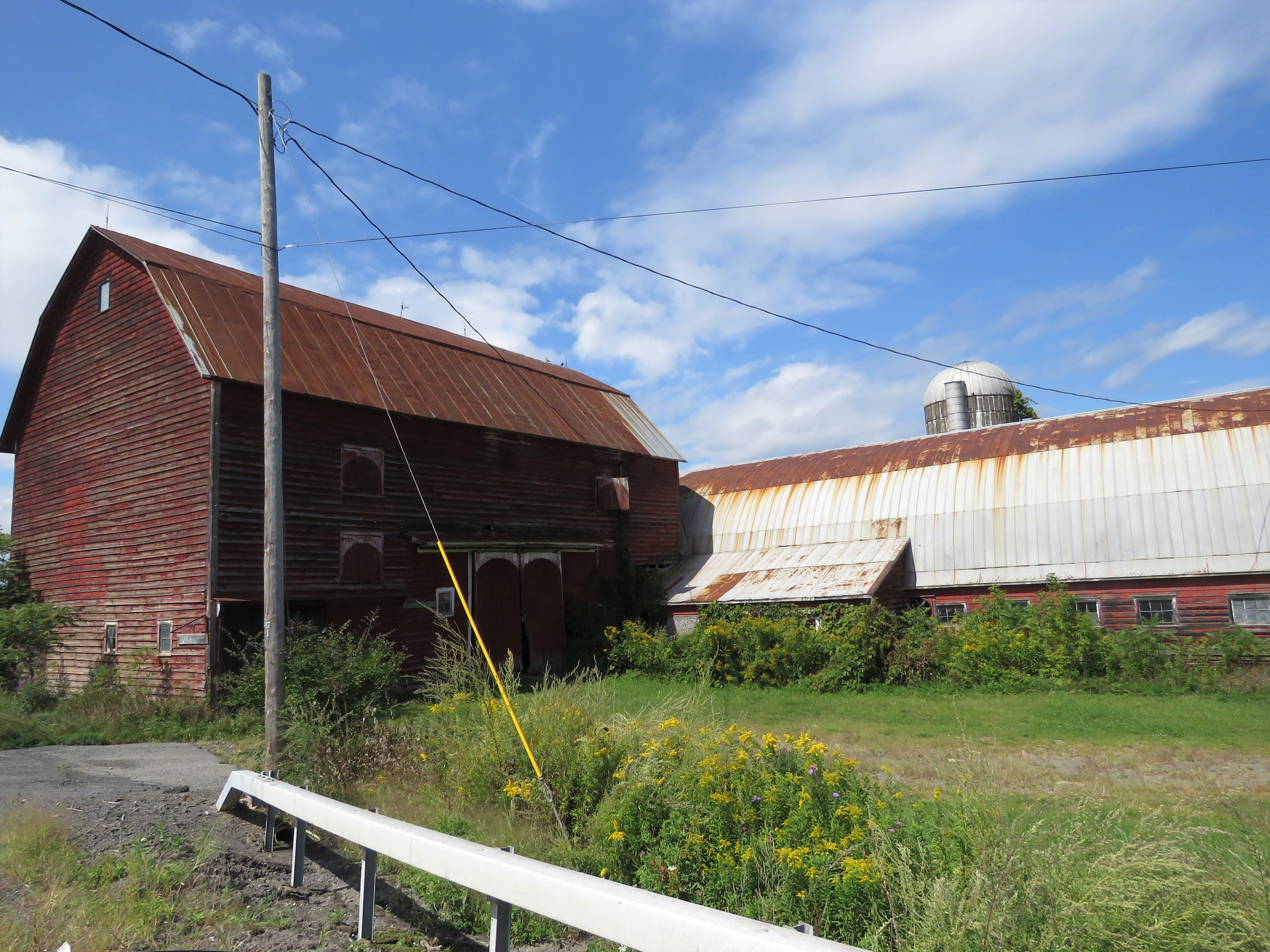
- Barns

- Location within New York Location within the United States
- Location: NY 20; Duanesburg, New York
- Coordinates: 42°45′37″N 74°6′56″W
- Area: 2.5 acres (1.0 ha)
- Built: c. 1848
- Architectural style: Greek Revival, Vernacular Greek Revival
- MPS: Duanesburg MRA
- NRHP reference No.: 87000913
- Added to NRHP: April 24, 1987

Ferguson Farm Complex is a historic home and farm complex located at Duanesburg in Schenectady County, in the U.S. state of New York. The house was built about 1848 and is a 2-story, three-bay clapboard-sided frame building in a vernacular Greek Revival style. It has a 2-story, three-bay wing and a 1½-story, two-bay wing. It features a gable roof with cornice returns, a wide frieze, and corner pilasters. Also on the property are two contributing barns (a hay barn and a dairy barn), a garage, shed, and silo.

The property was covered in a 1984 study of Duanesburg historical resources. It was listed on the National Register of Historic Places in 1987.
