= YMCA of Schenectady =

- U.S. National Register of Historic Places
- Location within New York Location within the United States
- Location: 9–13 State St., Schenectady, New York
- Coordinates: 42°48′55″N 73°57′03″W
- Area: 0.99 acres (0.40 ha)
- Built: 1926-1928, 1968
- Architect: Helmle & Corbett
- Architectural style: Late 19th and Early 20th Century Revivals
- NRHP reference No.: 15000854
- Added to NRHP: December 1, 2015

YMCA of Schenectady is a historic YMCA building located at Schenectady, Schenectady County, New York. It was built between 1926 and 1928, and is a four-story and basement, red brick building with cast stone detailing. An addition was constructed in 1968. It is nearly rectangular in plan overall – with E-shaped upper floors. The front façade features twin main entrances and is dominated by an elevated two-story verandah with substantial wood columns. YMCA occupied the building until 2014.

It was added to the National Register of Historic Places in 2015.
