= George Lasher House =

Historic house in New York, United States

- U.S. National Register of Historic Places
- Location within New York Location within the United States
- Location: Levey Rd., Duanesburg, New York
- Coordinates: 42°50′11″N 74°9′16″W
- Area: 183.5 acres (74.3 ha)
- Built: ca. 1800
- Architectural style: Federal
- MPS: Duanesburg MRA
- NRHP reference No.: 84003242
- Added to NRHP: October 11, 1984

George Lasher House, also known as Rainbow Hill, is a historic home located at Duanesburg in Schenectady County, New York. It was built about 1800 and is a two-story, five-bay frame building with a gable roof in the Federal style. Its front facade features a tripartite Palladian window. Also on the property are four contributing barns, a carriage barn, four sheds, and a garage.

The property was covered in a 1984 study of Duanesburg historical resources. It was listed on the National Register of Historic Places in 1984.
