= Schenectady City Hall =

- Schenectady City Hall and Post Office
- U.S. National Register of Historic Places
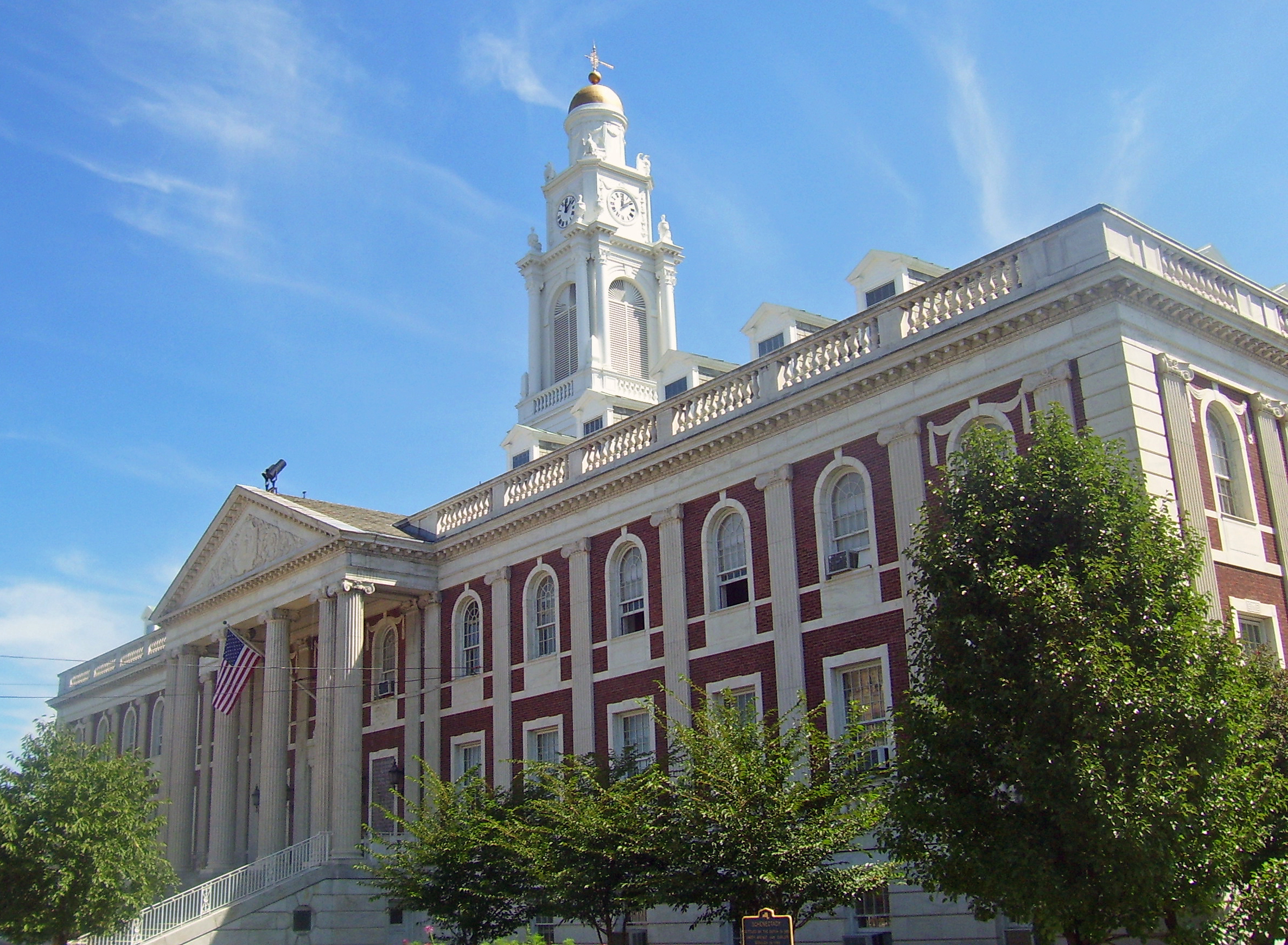
- East elevation, 2008
- Location: Schenectady, NY
- Coordinates: 42°48′50″N 73°56′21″W
- Area: 2.3 acres (0.93 ha)
- Built: 1931–1933
- Architect: McKim, Mead and White; Taylor, James Knox
- Architectural style: Classical Revival, Other, Neo-Colonial;Neo-Adamesque
- NRHP reference No.: 78001908

Schenectady City Hall is the seat of government of the city of Schenectady, New York, United States. Designed by McKim, Mead, and White, the building was constructed between 1931 and 1933. It is located on the block between Clinton, Franklin, Jay and Liberty streets. It is built in a revival of the Federal Style, the dominant style of American architecture from 1780 to 1830. Its most prominent features include the square clock tower, with its gold-leaf dome and weathervane, and the Ionic neoclassical portico.

The classically inspired architecture echoes the arched windows on the nearby post office, built two decades earlier. Both were listed on the National Register of Historic Places in 1978; the post office was later listed separately as part of a statewide submission of post offices.

== Building ==
City Hall is a 2 1/2-story brick building with a full-height central portico on the front and a semicircular projecting wing on the rear enclosing a rotunda. Its low dormer window-pierced hipped roof is topped with a clock tower and cupola with golden dome. Balustrades mark the roofline; on the front portico a pedimented entablature is supported by four fluted Ionic columns. Marble is used for pilasters, quoins and the rusticated raised basement.

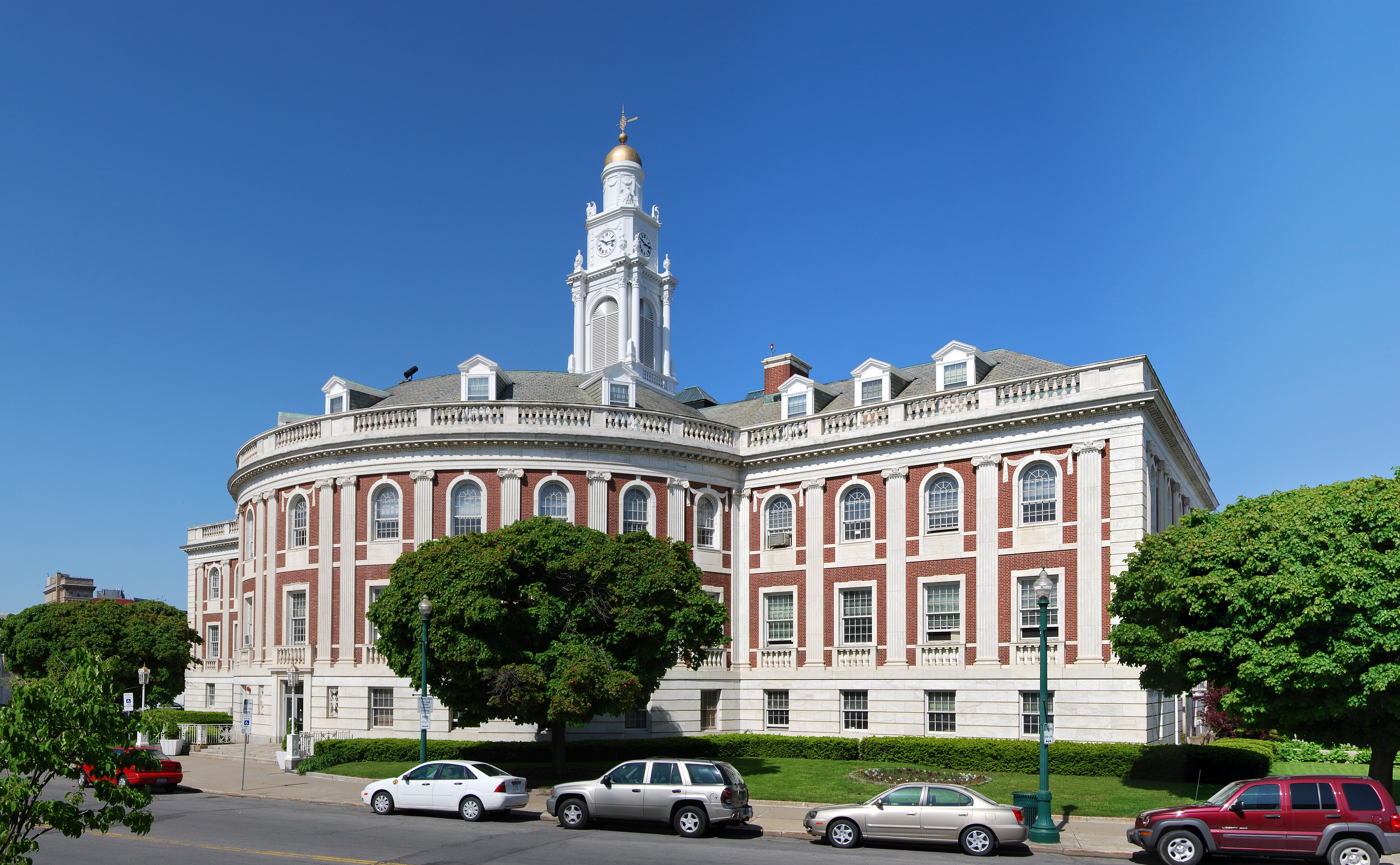
Schenectady City Hall viewed from the rear

Marble is also used extensively inside the building for stairs, flooring and wainscoting. Other decorative touches include the city's seal on brass doorknobs and intricately molded plaster cornices.

== History ==
When the decision was made to build a new city hall in the late 1920s, due to the city's rapid growth since the 1880s, the city held a nationwide contest, which was won by the prominent New York City architectural firm McKim, Mead, and White (MMW). The exorbitant cost of the project, which was undertaken during the Great Depression, caused the building to be dubbed "Fagal's Folly" after Mayor Henry C. Fagal. Their building went further in evoking the historical antecedents of Colonial buildings than most Colonial Revival buildings of the era, with enough neoclassical elements including a cupola styled after those on the buildings of Christopher Wren, that the building's style has been described as "neo-Georgian or neo-Federal".

At the cornerstone-laying ceremony, James McKellum Smith of MMW said the city government "recognize[s] that they are now erecting a building which may still be the center of civic life in the Schenectady of 100 years from today". Construction was completed in 1933. The building's interior layout has not been changed since then.

It was added to the National Register of Historic Places on October 11, 1978. Shortly afterwards a fire damaged the cupola. It was recently repaired.

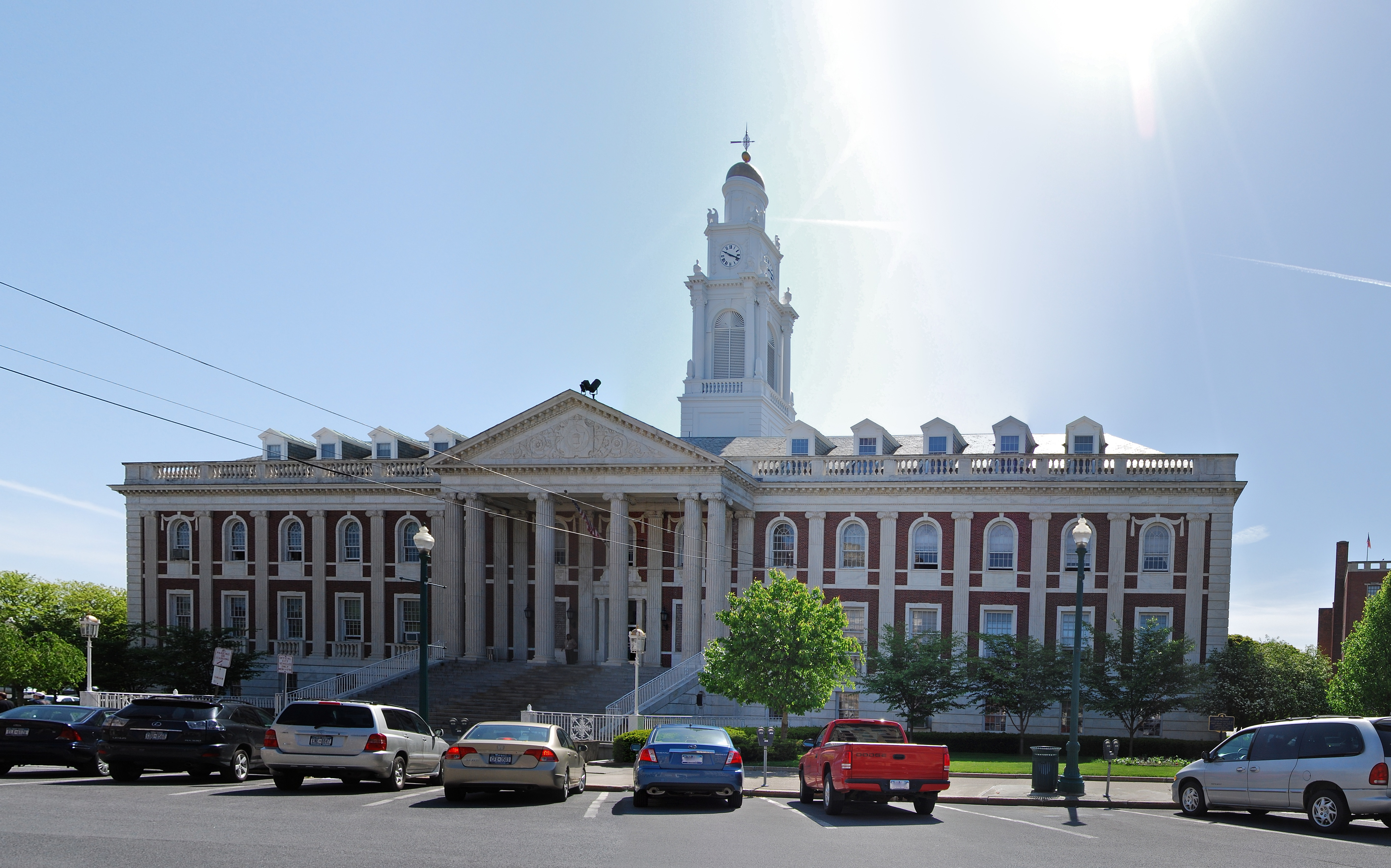
Another view

== See also ==
- National Register of Historic Places listings in Schenectady County, New York
