= Jenkins House (Delanson, New York) =

Historic house in New York, United States

- U.S. National Register of Historic Places
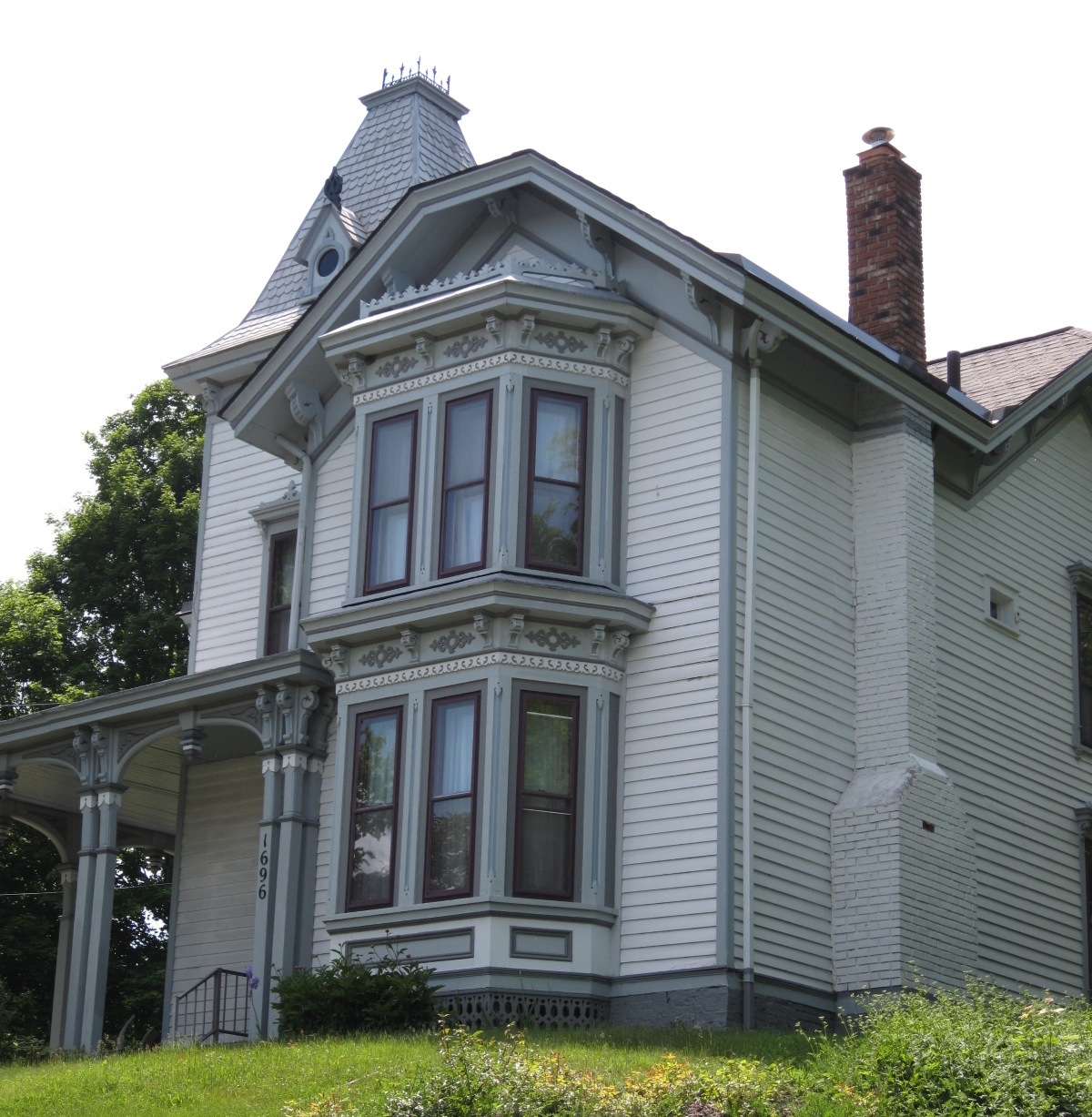
- Jenkins House, June 2009

- Location within New York Location within the United States
- Interactive map showing the location of Jenkins House
- Location: 1696 Main St., Delanson, New York
- Coordinates: 42°44′46″N 74°11′19″W
- Built: 1876
- Architectural style: Late Victorian
- MPS: Duanesburg MRA
- NRHP reference No.: 84003071
- Added to NRHP: October 11, 1984

Jenkins House, also known as The Grey Barn, is a house in Delanson, Schenectady County, New York. It was listed on the National Register of Historic Places in 1984. The house was originally constructed in 1876 for the station master of the Delaware and Hudson Railroad.

The house was partially destroyed by fire in 1971. The electrical fire started in a barn behind the home. The barn, home of The Grey Barn Antiques, was demolished as was the back portion of the home. Rebuilding and renovation were completed by 1972. Also constructed was a new antique shop behind the home.

The property was covered in a 1984 study of Duanesburg historical resources. It is currently a private residence and consulting office.

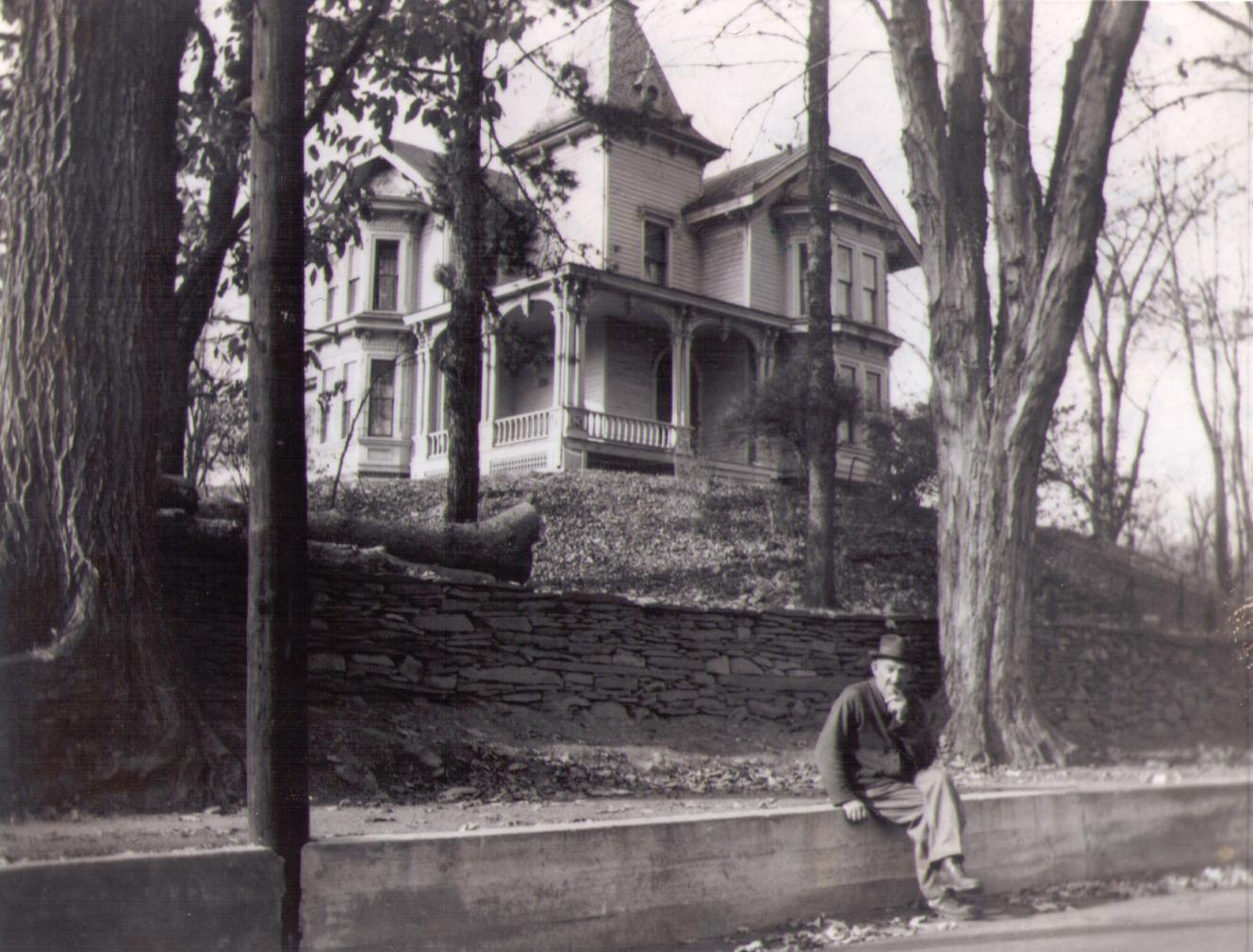
Empie Residence in the 1950s

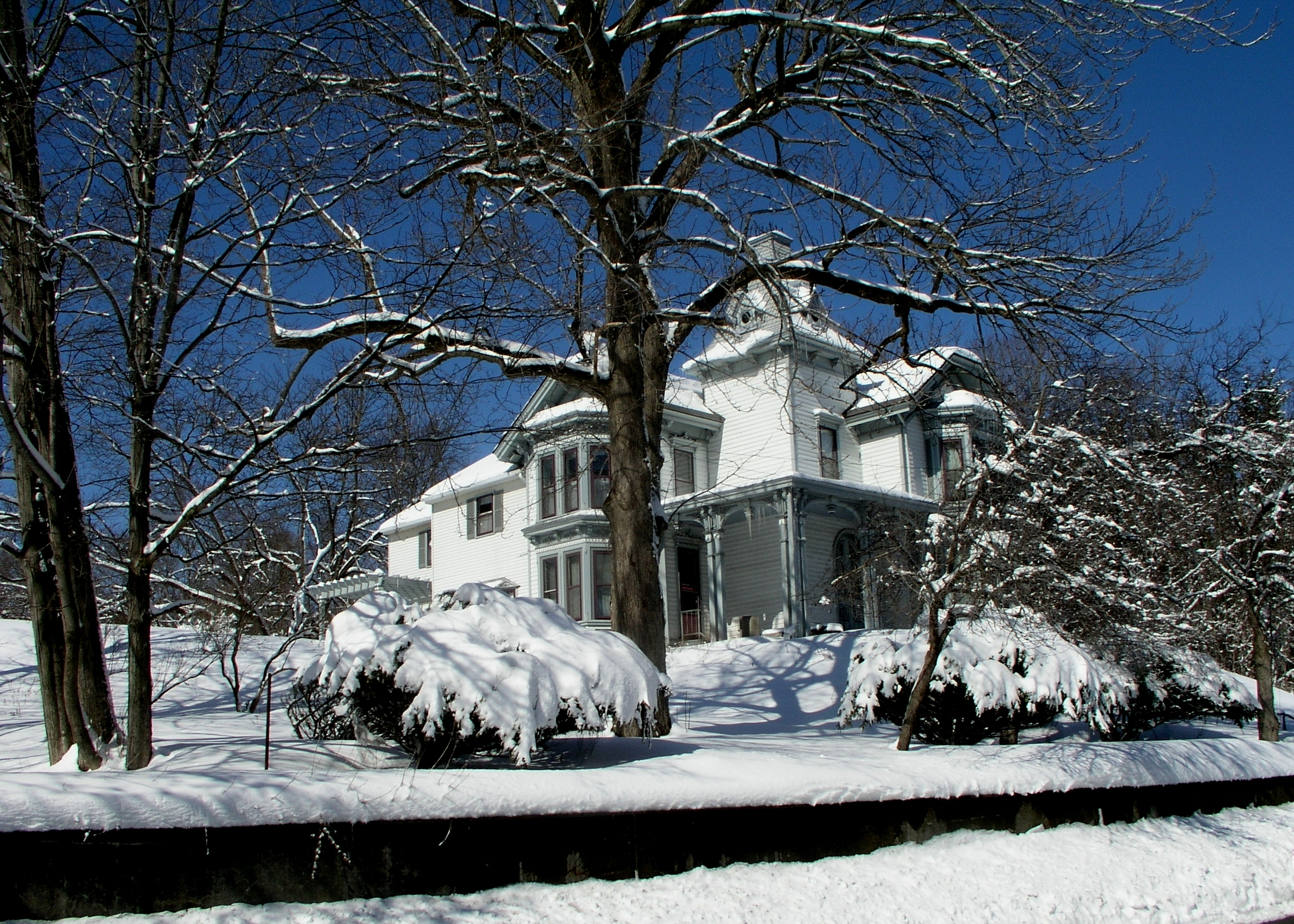
O'Connor Residence in March 2011

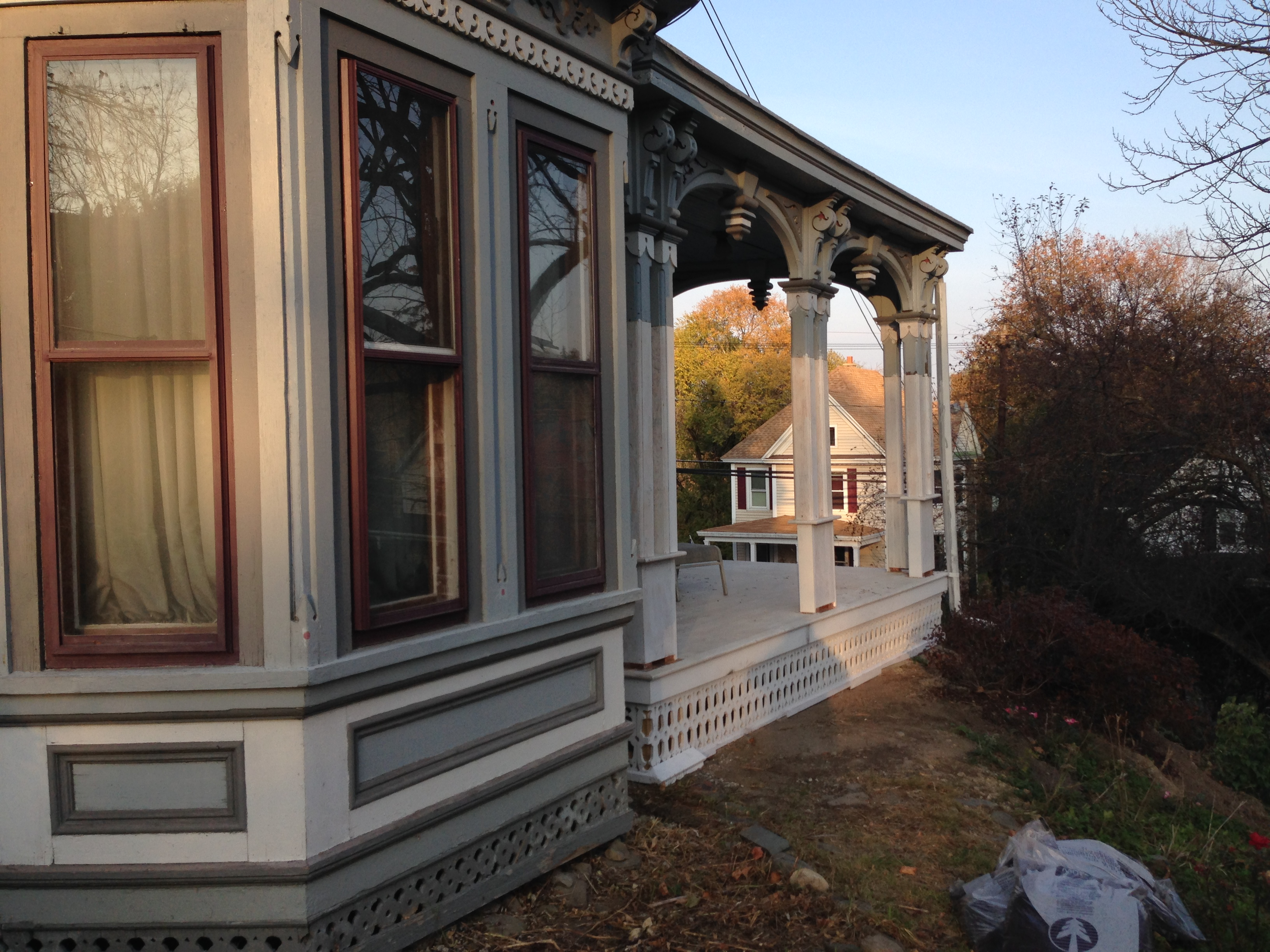
Jenkins House porch restoration underway in October 2013
