= Mica Insulator Company =

- U.S. National Register of Historic Places
- Location within New York Location within the United States
- Location: 797 & 845 Broadway, Schenectady, New York
- Coordinates: 42°48′14″N 73°57′06″W
- Area: 7.34 acres (2.97 ha)
- Built: 1915, 1946
- Built by: Turner Construction
- Architect: William Lee Stoddard
- Architectural style: Daylight factory
- NRHP reference No.: 11001007
- Added to NRHP: January 4, 2012

Mica Insulator Company is a historic daylight factory complex located at Schenectady, Schenectady County, New York. The complex consists of the four-story Micanite Works built in 1915 and the adjacent three-story Lamicoid Building built in 1946. The two buildings are connected by a third floor exterior walkway. The Micanite Works is of reinforced concrete construction and the Lamicoid Building is a steel frame building with brick curtain walls. Both features large multi-paned windows and open floor plans.

It was added to the National Register of Historic Places in 2015.
