= Shute Octagon House =

Historic house in New York, United States

- U.S. National Register of Historic Places
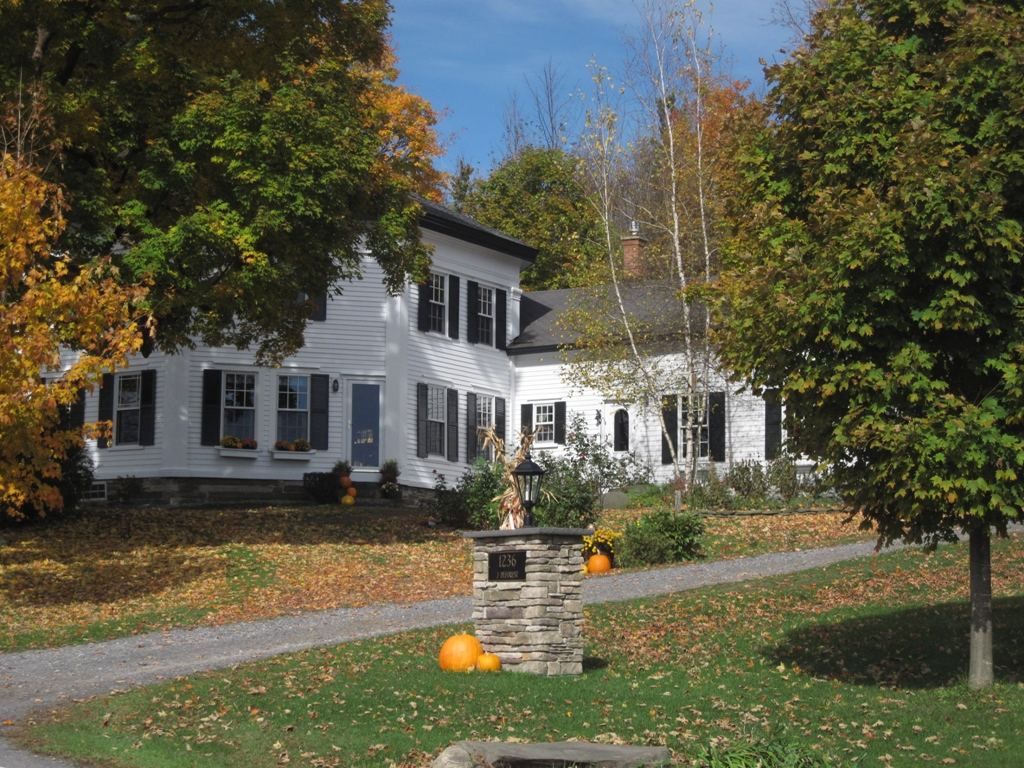
- Shute Octagon House, October 2009

- Location within New York Location within the United States
- Interactive map showing the location of Shute Octagon House
- Location: McGuire School Rd., Duanesburg, New York
- Coordinates: 42°46′28″N 74°13′10″W
- Area: 41.6 acres (16.8 ha)
- Built: 1855
- Architect: Jones, Alexander Delos (Boss)
- Architectural style: Greek Revival, Octagon Mode
- MPS: Duanesburg MRA
- NRHP reference No.: 84003276
- Added to NRHP: October 11, 1984

The Shute Octagon House is a historic octagon house located on McGuire School Road in Duanesburg, Schenectady County, New York. It was built about 1855 by noted master carpenter Alexander Delos "Boss" Jones. It is a 2-story, clapboard-sided farmhouse with a 1 1/2-story wing in the Greek Revival style. It features innovative stacked plank construction, a low-pitched polygonal roof surmounted by a widow's walk, a full entablature circling the structure. A 1-story porch with porte cochere was added about 1906. Also on the property are four contributing barns, a shed, and a smokehouse.

The property was covered in a 1984 study of Duanesburg historical resources. The property was also-covered in a study of Boss Jones TR It was listed on the National Register of Historic Places in 1984.
