= Reformed Presbyterian Church Parsonage (Duanesburg, New York) =

Historic house in New York, United States

- U.S. National Register of Historic Places
- Location within New York Location within the United States
- Location: Duanesburg Churches Rd., Duanesburg, New York
- Coordinates: 42°46′16″N 74°9′26″W
- Area: 6.1 acres (2.5 ha)
- Built: ca. 1829
- Architectural style: Federal, Vernacular Federal
- MPS: Duanesburg MRA
- NRHP reference No.: 84003271
- Added to NRHP: October 11, 1984

Reformed Presbyterian Church Parsonage is a historic Reformed Presbyterian church parsonage on Duanesburg Churches Road in Duanesburg, Schenectady County, New York. It was built about 1829 and is a two-story, five-bay, frame vernacular Federal style residence. It has a gable roof with cornice returns, a narrow frieze, clapboard siding, and slender corner boards. It has a two-story rear wing. Also on the property is a contributing barn.

The property was listed on the National Register of Historic Places in 1987.
