= Hawes Homestead =

Historic house in New York, United States

- U.S. National Register of Historic Places
- Location within New York Location within the United States
- Location: Herrick Rd., Duanesburg, New York
- Coordinates: 42°47′35″N 74°12′39″W
- Area: 88.2 acres (35.7 ha)
- Built: c. 1835
- Architectural style: Greek Revival, Vernacular Greek Revival
- MPS: Duanesburg MRA
- NRHP reference No.: 84003217
- Added to NRHP: October 11, 1984

Hawes Homestead is a historic home located at Duanesburg in Schenectady County, New York. It was built in the 1830s and is a 1 1/2-story, rectangular frame building with clapboard siding in a vernacular Greek Revival style. It has a gable roof with prominent cornice returns and a broad frieze pierced by rectangular eyebrow windows. Also on the property are two contributing barns, a smokehouse, and a shed.

The property was covered in a 1984 study of Duanesburg historical resources. It was listed on the National Register of Historic Places in 1984.
