= Jenkins Octagon House =

Historic house in New York, United States

- U.S. National Register of Historic Places
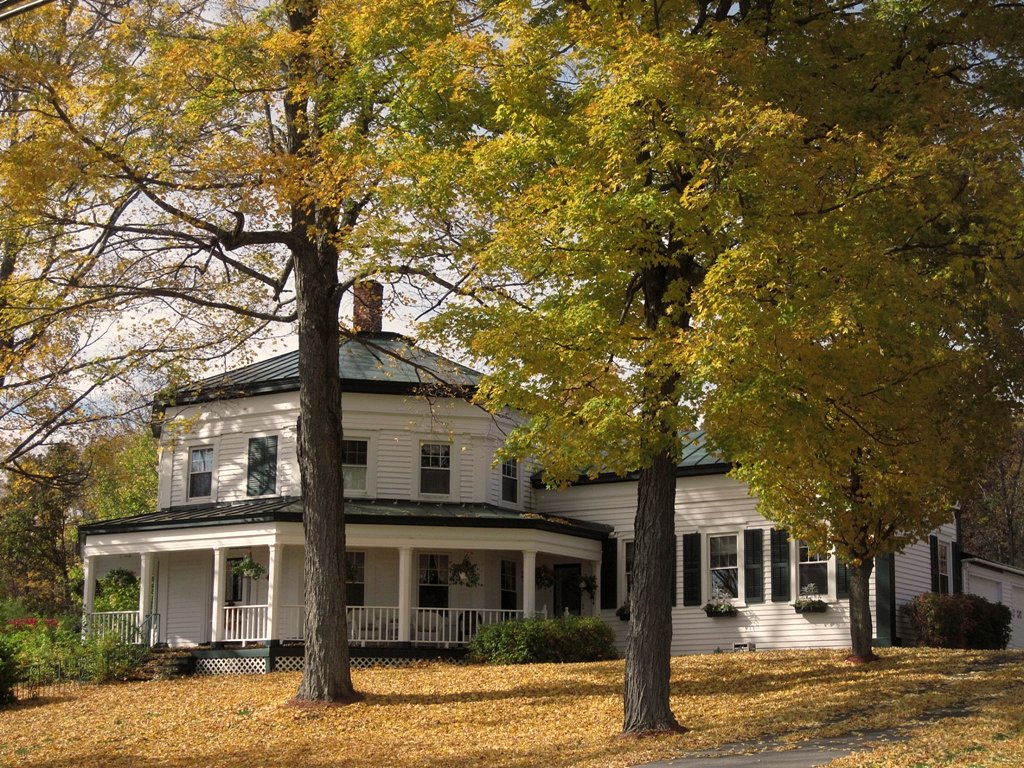
- Jenkins Octagon House, October 2009

- Location within New York Location within the United States
- Interactive map showing the location of Jenkins Octagon House
- Location: NY 395, Duanesburg, New York
- Coordinates: 42°45′31″N 74°11′7″W
- Area: 151.2 acres (61.2 ha)
- Built: 1855
- Architect: Jones, Alexander Delos (Boss)
- Architectural style: Greek Revival, Octagon Mode
- MPS: Duanesburg MRA
- NRHP reference No.: 84003227
- Added to NRHP: October 11, 1984

The Jenkins Octagon House is an historic octagon house located on NY 395 in Duanesburg, Schenectady County, New York. It was built about 1855 by noted master carpenter Alexander Delos "Boss" Jones. It is a two-story, clapboard-sided farmhouse with Greek Revival style features. It features innovative stacked plank construction, a low-pitched polygonal roof with a central chimney, a full entablature circling the structure, and a one-story porch with a hipped roof. Also on the property are two contributing barns, a shed, and a gazebo.

The property was covered in a 1984 study of Duanesburg historical resources. The property was also covered in a study of Boss Jones TR It was listed on the National Register of Historic Places in 1984.
