= Thomas Liddle Farm Complex =

Historic house in New York, United States

- U.S. National Register of Historic Places
- Location within New York Location within the United States
- Location: Eaton Corners Rd., Duanesburg, New York
- Coordinates: 42°47′51″N 74°14′23″W
- Area: 177.1 acres (71.7 ha)
- Built: 1850
- Architectural style: Greek Revival, Vernacular Greek Revival
- MPS: Duanesburg MRA
- NRHP reference No.: 84003247
- Added to NRHP: October 11, 1984

Thomas Liddle Farm Complex is a historic home and farm complex located at Duanesburg in Schenectady County, New York. The farmhouse was built about 1850 and is a 2-story, three-bay clapboard-sided frame building in a vernacular Greek Revival style. It has a gable roof, prominent cornice returns, a wide frieze, and broad, fluted corner pilasters. The 1 1/2-story rear wing dates to the late 18th century. Also on the property are a contributing barn and a tenant house.

The property was covered in a 1984 study of Duanesburg historical resources. It was listed on the National Register of Historic Places in 1984.
