= Mariaville Historic District =

Historic district in New York, United States

- U.S. National Register of Historic Places
- U.S. Historic district
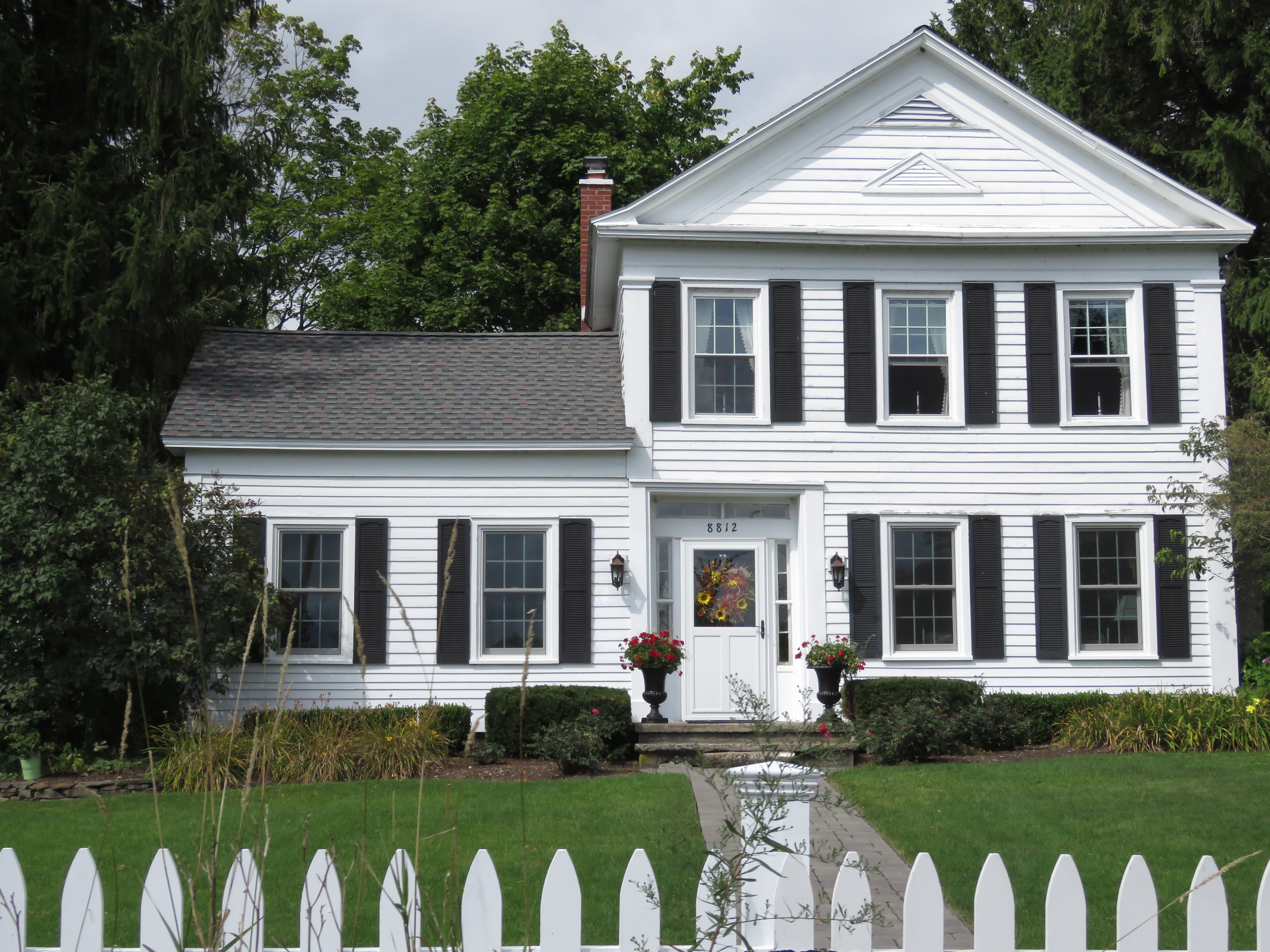
- 8770 Mariaville Road

- Location within New York Location within the United States
- Location: NY 159; Duanesburg, New York
- Coordinates: 42°49′42″N 74°8′8″W
- Area: 9 acres (3.6 ha)
- Built: 1830
- Architectural style: Greek Revival, Vernacular Greek Revival
- MPS: Duanesburg MRA
- NRHP reference No.: 84003267
- Added to NRHP: October 11, 1984

Mariaville Historic District is a national historic district located at Duanesburg in Schenectady County, New York. The district includes seven contributing buildings along the northwest shore of Mariaville Lake near the Chuctanunda Creek. It encompasses five residences, one church (First Presbyterian Church of Duanesburg), one commercial building (Silas Marsh General Store), and five outbuildings. The buildings date from the 1830s to 1850s and are representative of the Greek Revival style.

The property was covered in a 1984 study of Duanesburg historical resources. It was listed on the National Register of Historic Places in 1984.
