= Horace Mann School (Schenectady, New York) =

- U.S. National Register of Historic Places
- Location within New York Location within the United States
- Location: 602 Craig St., Schenectady, New York
- Coordinates: 42°48′12″N 73°56′24″W
- Area: 0.74 acres (0.30 ha)
- Built: 1907-1908
- Architect: possibly W. Thomas Wooley
- Architectural style: Early 20th Century American Movement, Neoclassical
- NRHP reference No.: 15000824
- Added to NRHP: November 24, 2015

Horace Mann School, also known as Craig Street School, is a historic school building located at Schenectady, Schenectady County, New York. It was built in 1907–1908, and is a two-story, I-shaped brick building above a reinforced concrete basement. The building includes some Neoclassical design elements including large fanlights, a projecting modillioned cornice, and monumental corner pilasters. A one-story rear addition was constructed in 1986. The Horace Mann School closed in 1981. The building is identical to the former Franklin School, listed on the National Register of Historic Places in 1983.

It was added to the National Register of Historic Places in 2015.
