= Sheldon Farmhouse =

Historic house in New York, United States

- U.S. National Register of Historic Places
- Location within New York Location within the United States
- Location: NY 7, Duanesburg, New York
- Coordinates: 42°43′27″N 74°15′20″W
- Area: 41.6 acres (16.8 ha)
- Built: 1795
- Architectural style: Federal, Vernacular Federal
- MPS: Duanesburg MRA
- NRHP reference No.: 84003273
- Added to NRHP: October 11, 1984

Sheldon Farmhouse is a historic home located at Duanesburg in Schenectady County, New York. It was built about 1795 and is a two-story, five-bay, frame residence on a limestone foundation in a vernacular Federal style. It features a gable roof and interior end chimneys. Also on the property are two contributing barns.

The property was covered in a 1984 study of Duanesburg historical resources. It was listed on the National Register of Historic Places in 1984.
