= Becker Farmhouse =

Historic house in New York, United States

- U.S. National Register of Historic Places
- Location within New York Location within the United States
- Location: Creek Rd., Duanesburg, New York
- Coordinates: 42°45′7″N 74°15′43″W
- Area: 113.4 acres (45.9 ha)
- Built: c. 1850
- Architectural style: Greek Revival, Italianate
- MPS: Duanesburg MRA
- NRHP reference No.: 84003114
- Added to NRHP: October 11, 1984

Becker Farmhouse is a historic home located at Duanesburg in Schenectady County, in the U.S. state of New York. It was built about 1850 by noted master carpenter Alexander Delos "Boss" Jones. It is a two-story, three-bay frame building with a hipped roof in a combined late Greek Revival / Italianate architecture style. It has a one-story addition with a gable roof. It features a cupola. Also on the property are four barns and two sheds.

The property was covered in a 1984 study of Duanesburg historical resources. The property was also covered in a study of Boss Jones TR It was listed on the National Register of Historic Places in 1984.
