= Abrahams Farmhouse =

Historic house in New York, United States

- U.S. National Register of Historic Places
- Location within New York Location within the United States
- Location: Hardin Rd., Duanesburg, New York
- Coordinates: 42°48′30″N 74°11′25″W
- Area: 1 acre (0.40 ha)
- Built: c. 1839
- Architectural style: Greek Revival; Vernacular Greek Revival
- MPS: Duanesburg MRA
- NRHP reference No.: 84003092
- Added to NRHP: October 11, 1984

Abrahams Farmhouse is a historic home located at Duanesburg in Schenectady County, New York. It was built about 1839 and is a 1 1/2-story, rectangular frame building with a gable roof in a vernacular Greek Revival style. It features a wide frieze pierced by eyebrow windows.

The property was covered in a 1984 study of Duanesburg historical resources. It was listed on the National Register of Historic Places in 1984.
