= Delanson, New York =

- Village
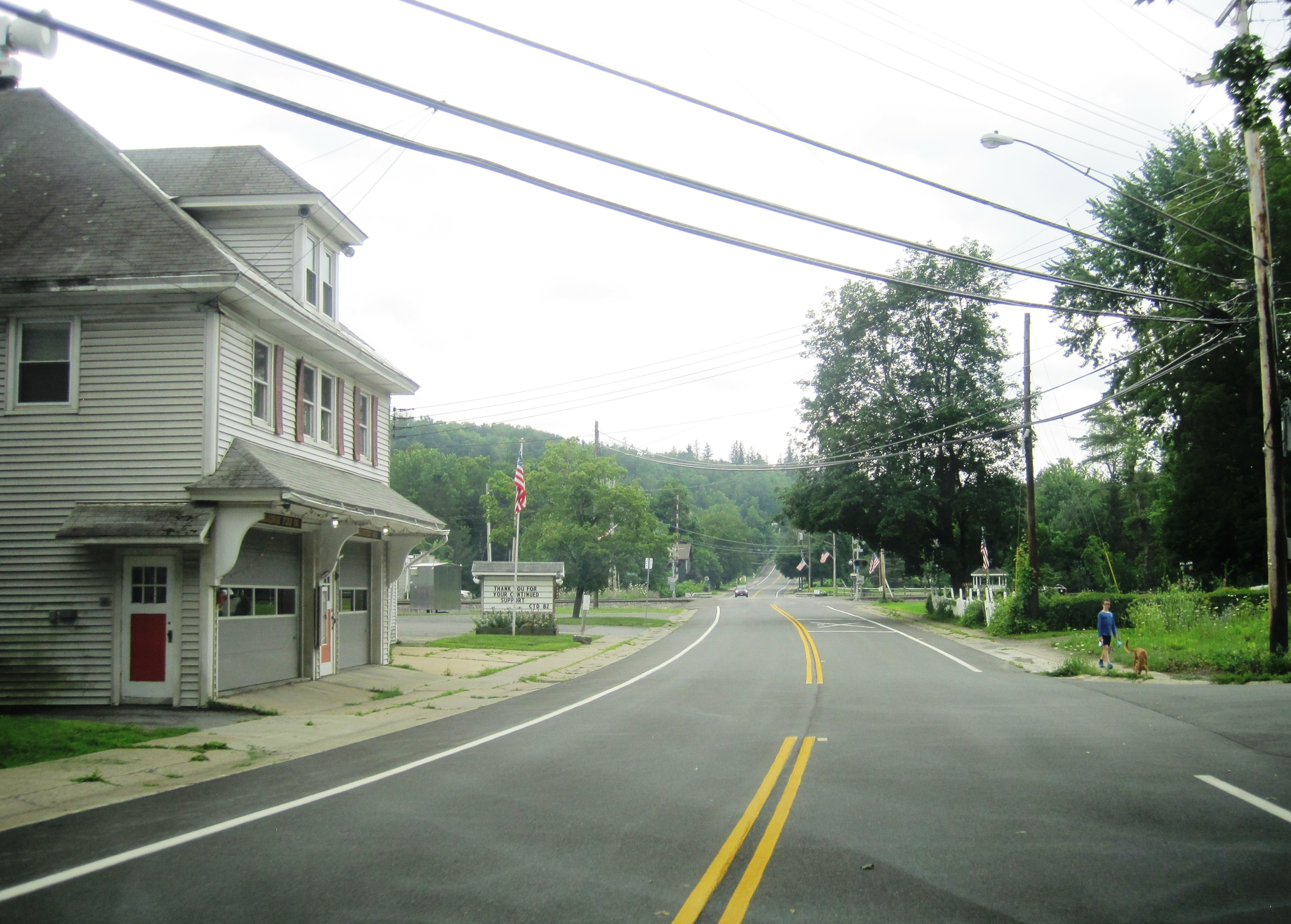
- Southbound NY 395 (Main Street) in Delanson

- Location in Schenectady County and the state of New York.
- Coordinates: 42°44′55″N 74°11′7″W
- Country: United States
- State: New York
- County: Schenectady

Area
  - Total: 0.64 sq mi (1.67 km^{2})
  - Land: 0.64 sq mi (1.67 km^{2})
  - Water: 0.0039 sq mi (0.01 km^{2})
- Elevation: 817 ft (249 m)

Population (2020)
  - Total: 335
  - Density: 520.5/sq mi (200.97/km^{2})
- Time zone: UTC-5 (Eastern (EST))
  - Summer (DST): UTC-4 (EDT)
- ZIP code: 12053
- Area code: 518
- FIPS code: 36-20082
- GNIS feature ID: 0948261
- Website: www.delanson.net

Delanson is a village in Schenectady County, New York, United States. The population was 335 at the 2020 census. Delanson is in the southeastern portion of the town of Duanesburg.

== Geography ==
Delanson is located at 42°44′55″N 74°11′7″W (42.748640, -74.185222).

According to the United States Census Bureau, the village has a total area of 0.6 square miles (1.6 km^{2}), all land.

== Demographics ==
Historical population
Census	Pop.	Note	%±
1930	372		—
1940	326		−12.4%
1950	430		31.9%
1960	398		−7.4%
1970	508		27.6%
1980	448		−11.8%
1990	361		−19.4%
2000	385		6.6%
2010	377		−2.1%
2020	335		−11.1%
U.S. Decennial Census

As of the census of 2000, there were 385 people, 151 households, and 109 families residing in the village. The population density was 616.7 inhabitants per square mile (238.1/km^{2}). There were 156 housing units at an average density of 249.9 per square mile (96.5/km^{2}). The racial makeup of the village was 95.06% White, 1.30% African American, 1.56% Native American, 0.26% from other races, and 1.82% from two or more races. Hispanic or Latino of any race were 0.26% of the population.

There were 151 households, out of which 33.1% had children under the age of 18 living with them, 58.9% were married couples living together, 6.6% had a female householder with no husband present, and 27.8% were non-families. 21.2% of all households were made up of individuals, and 7.9% had someone living alone who was 65 years of age or older. The average household size was 2.54 and the average family size was 2.99.

In the village, the population was spread out, with 24.9% under the age of 18, 7.0% from 18 to 24, 30.6% from 25 to 44, 25.7% from 45 to 64, and 11.7% who were 65 years of age or older. The median age was 37 years. For every 100 females, there were 96.4 males. For every 100 females age 18 and over, there were 99.3 males.

The median income for a household in the village was $58,036, and the median income for a family was $60,000. Males had a median income of $38,889 versus $30,000 for females. The per capita income for the village was $24,114. None of the families and 0.5% of the population were living below the poverty line, including no under eighteens and 4.1% of those over 64.

== History ==
The village of Delanson is situated in the southern part of the town of Duanesburg, Schenectady County, New York. It lies between the historic Cherry Valley Turnpike, also known as the Third Great Western Turnpike (now part of US 20), and another highway once known as the Danforth Turnpike (now New York State Route 7).

Under the name of Delanson, its history dates back only to 1893. The sister hamlet of Quaker Street, situated approximately one-half mile to the south of Delanson and on the Danforth Turnpike (now New York Route 7), was the pioneer business center serving the surrounding territory before the era of railroad transportation. What is now known as Delanson was then referred to as Toad Hollow because it lies to the head of the Normans Kill drainage.

The Albany and Susquehanna Railroad, being authorized and organized by the state legislature to construct a railroad from Albany to Binghamton, built the railroad in sections. The first section extended from Albany to Central Bridge, and their engineers, seeking a favorable grade, found the desired route passed through the upper part of the Normans Kill valley which provided an improved means of transportation for this vicinity. This section was constructed from 1861 to 1863 inclusive, and in the latter year transportation was established between the above-named points. To best serve the needs of Quaker Street, a site was chosen for a station and other necessary facilities. A station and freight house were erected on the east side of the highway crossing, between certain tracks existing at that time. This was given the name Quaker Street Station.

The Delaware and Hudson Canal Company was organized and was expanded by buying or leasing railroads from Rouses Point, New York to Wilkes-Barre, Pennsylvania and the canal from Honesdale, Pennsylvania to Rondout, New York. The Albany and Susquehanna Railroad was leased to the Delaware and Hudson Canal Company and became part of its Susquehanna Division. Later, the canal properties were sold to Samuel Coykendall, who dropped the word "canal" from the corporation title. The Schenectady and Duanesburg Railroad was built from Delanson to Schenectady; at Delanson it connected with, and became part of, the Susquehanna division of the Delaware and Hudson Railroad. The formation of a junction brought increased activities to this point, making it necessary for more men to be employed.

Out of necessity, homes were built for the accommodation of those employed in their different capacities by the railroad. Several business places opened up, including a coal business owned and operated by Mr. Hicks Sheldon, who conducted this business until the time of his death, after which it was purchased by Mr. W. C Briggs.

For many years Doctors Hill and Roche of Quaker Street gave medical attention to persons in the territory.

For a few years there was a creamery, but this did not last long and was sold to Charles Washburn, who changed it to a storehouse. On the east side of the railroad tracks a saw mill was built and later expanded to include feed grinding, flour milling, and dealing in lumber supplies, successively owned and operated by A. Ball, Peter Hunt, Charles Washburn, and Briggs and Horohoe.

In keeping with the times two hotels were brought into being for the accommodation of the traveling public; one by James Shoudy and the other later owned by Richard Mackey.

Because of the nature of the employment, the population of the village was largely of the transient type with employees coming here to work for terms of different duration and leaving through advancement, promotion, or the desire to seek other employment due to the proximity of Schenectady with its extensive enterprises. This being the case, there is a considerable lack of accurate records, and this makes it difficult to record in true order the events which contributed to the growth of the village.

During the decade preceding 1890 there was considerable discussion over choosing a name for the settlement. The name "Caryell", after a man living here, was proposed. C. D. Hammond, who was superintendent of the Delaware and Hudson Railroad, named it Delanson, coining the word from Delaware and Hudson. He took the first three letters of Delaware (Del), the first two of "and" (an), and added the last three letters of the word Hudson (son), making the complete word "Delanson". Thus the name had changed from Toad Hollow to Quaker Street Station to Delanson.

Because the post office was located at Quaker Street, and feeling the need for more adequate post office facilities, a movement was started to establish a post office at Delanson. Providing the name of the community was the first necessary step in the process of securing a post office. In 1893, a post office was established in the store of one Ed Wilber, which building has continually housed the post office to the date of this compilation. Wilber was appointed acting postmaster in 1893, and was succeeded in December of the same year by Mr. Lorin H. White, Delanson's first regularly appointed postmaster.

During the agitation for a name, a post office, and other matters necessary to a new community, the people were not unmindful of their needs for a place in which to worship. The reward of their efforts was the Methodist Episcopal Church, erected in 1877–78, which still stands and adequately serves its purpose. The pastor of this church for many years also presided at the services in the old North Church located at Lee's Church, sometimes known as Lee's Corners. The parsonage was built in 1886 on the south side of the church.

The last portion of the railroad, Bainbridge to Binghamton, was completed in 1869 and through traffic was established; this resulted in increasing activities to the railroad. Car inspectors were employed; cripple track service for the repair of damaged cars and a roundhouse for the care of locomotives were some of the facilities provided in keeping with the upward trend of business. In 1885, the first station, and hay barn adjoining, burned. Immediately a new station was erected on the present site. Building a new station here necessitated the removal of the first crude method of refueling locomotives, and a turntable, to a new location. The new refueling plant was provided at a point near the present water tanks and served for several years. About 1900, a greatly improved refueling plant was coal storage facilities was built, this served until 1929 when the refueling of engines was discontinued at this point. Although a considerable number of men had found employment in different capacities, a policy of retrenchment was adopted as was general on all railroad due to business conditions, with the result that all of the smaller terminals were eliminated, thus removing this source of employment.

The hotel and restaurant owned and operated by Mr. James Shoudy, located just south of the station burned in June 1891. The restaurant was never rebuilt but Mr. Shoudy immediately started reconstruction of the hotel on the old foundation. This locally supported two blacksmith's shops, one of which stood on the site of the present post office building and was later moved to its present location, the other was located east of the highway crossing on the lands of James Shoudy – this was razed in 1933.

Early in the 1880s, a small greenhouse was built under the direction of Mrs. H. W. Harris. To this was added, at different times, four other units as the volume of business expanded. Later, her son assumed ownership and operation of the flourishing business. Since then Mr. Kapper and then Mr. R. P. Hagadorn purchased and operated the greenhouse – after approximately fifty five years of service this was torn down.

The demands for improved water service for both railroad and domestic purposes reached a stage beyond the ability of private means to supply. As a result, the Duanesburg Water Company was incorporated and a reservoir with the necessary means of distribution was installed. The reservoir was located north of the Delanson and just south of the Cherry Valley Turnpike. This construction took place in 1895. Another reservoir was added about 1909.

Surrounding territory supplied the railroad with a considerable amount of business through the shipment of hay, handled by dealers located here at different times. Some of them were D.A. Ball, John Ball, Fox and Terpening, Lauren Webster, R.A. Babcock, Harold Babcock, and Ernest Babcock, who is local representative of Grange League Federation and conducts a feed store.

Delanson's first postmaster, L.H. White, also established in 1894 an undertaking and furniture business which he conducted until his death. Mr. Galen White, his son assumed ownership then and has continued the business. Mr. L.H. White further increased his activities by representing this district in the state legislature.

Prior to 1920, there were from time to time serious discussions on fire protection and the question of establishing a fire district or incorporating the village. The first step was to organize a volunteer fire department in 1920. This was followed in 1921 by the incorporation of the village. A small hand-drawn hosecart and chemical apparatus was purchased; later a motorized pumper was bought. Mr. R.A. Babcock was the first president of the village. Under his supervision, and with the aid of a progressive board of trustees, a building was built, to be known as the Village Hall, and with provisions for housing the fire-fighting equipment and headquarters for the fire department. This building, started in 1922, and completed in 1923, contains, besides the above-mentioned features, an auditorium, a room for the Village Board and a fully equipped kitchen.

In 1925, the Fulton County Gas and Electric Company established service in this village, providing street lights and current for domestic use.

Many sources of employment on the railroad were established which caused the removal of many employees from this point. Since that time families have moved here to occupy the homes but many of them are employed elsewhere, principally in Schenectady. This has changed the type of village from commercial to residential.

A number of historic buildings were included in the Delanson Historic District, listed on the National Register of Historic Places in 1984. The Christman Bird and Wildlife Sanctuary was listed in 1970.

== See also ==
- Duanesburg High School
