= Downtown Schenectady =

Downtown Schenectady City of Schenectady
- Neighborhood/Central business district
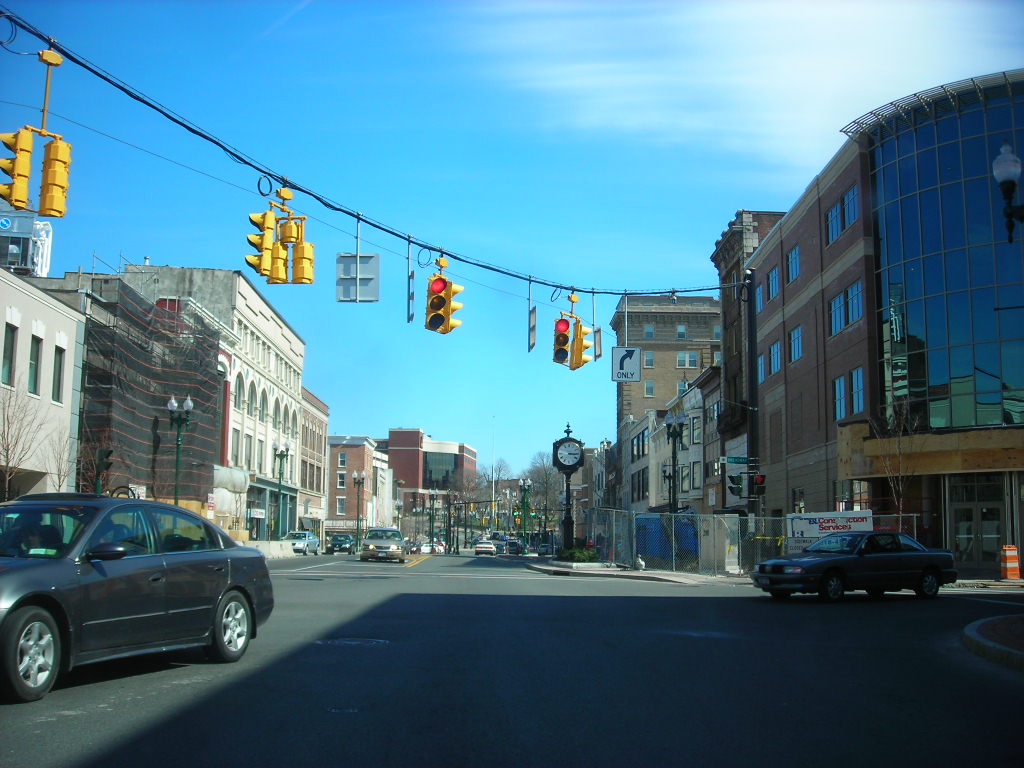
- State Street looking east in 2007, during the height of new construction

- Location of Downtown Schenectady within the state of New York
- Coordinates: 42°48′45″N 73°56′33″W
- Country: United States
- State: New York
- Region: Capital District
- County: Schenectady County
- Settled: 1820s

Area
  - Total: 0.53 sq mi (1.4 km^{2})

Population (2000)
  - Total: 3,915
  - Density: 7,400/sq mi (2,900/km^{2})
- Time zone: UTC-5 (Eastern Standard Time)
  - Summer (DST): UTC-4 (Eastern Daylight Time)
- ZIP Code: 12305
- Area code: 518
- Website: Downtown Schenectady Improvement Corporation; Metroplex Development Authority

Downtown Schenectady is the central business district for the city of Schenectady, New York. It originated in the 1820s with the moving of the commercial and industrial interests east from the original 17th and 18th century settlement, spurred on by the development of the Erie Canal. Home to the headquarters and major manufacturing plants of two large corporations, General Electric and American Locomotive Company, Downtown Schenectady catered to tens of thousands of workers in its heyday. Typical of the post-industrial Northeastern United States and Upstate New York in particular, Downtown Schenectady saw a decline in manufacturing and population starting in the 1970s. Recent construction and renovation has caused the downtown area to become an entertainment mecca for New York's Capital District anchored by Proctor's Theatre.

== History ==
The area of Downtown Schenectady was built shortly after a fire in 1819 destroyed 169 buildings in what is now the Stockade neighborhood. The Stockade neighborhood was the original extent of settlement in Schenectady from the 17th century, and settlement had barely begun on the north side of State Street. Shortly after the fire however the Erie Canal was being built a few hundred yards east of the city and therefore the commercial interests of Schenectady began to move east to what is now Downtown Schenectady, this left the Stockade to develop as a residential community separate from the business district.

Downtown Schenectady includes Union College, which is a private 4-year college established in 1795. In July 1806, the college determined to acquire a large tract of land to the east of the main settlement in Schenectady, on a gentle slope up from the Mohawk River and facing nearly due west. This tract was not promisingly described by college president Eliphalet Nott some years later as “pasture grounds, scarred by deep ravines, rendered at once unsightly and difficult of access by an alternation of swamp and sand hill…”.

Due to the fact that the Erie Canal from Schenectady to Albany was 40 miles (64 km) long compared to 17 miles (27 km) by land an alternative to the canal was proposed by George Featherstonhaugh. With the support of the Patroon of Rensselaerswyck Stephen van Rensselaer the Mohawk and Hudson Railroad was built. Opened for service in 1831 this was the first steam passenger locomotive running regularly scheduled service in the United States. The present railroad right-of-way from Hamburg Street to the present-day Amtrak station opened in 1843.

Thomas Edison moved his Edison Machine Works to Schenectady in 1887, and in 1892 it became the headquarters of the General Electric Company (GE). The location chosen was at the western end of Erie Boulevard at the edge of Downtown. The GE Plant along with American Locomotive Company's (ALCO) plant (1848–1970) and headquarters (1901–1970) at the east end of downtown along the Mohawk River gave fuel to downtown's commercial activities as thousands of workers at the two plants would patronize the establishments along State Street and Erie Boulevard. ALCO was a pioneer in many different industrial fields, beginning with steam locomotion and progressing through electric and diesel-electric. From ALCO's plant several historic products came from Downtown Schenectady including the first diesel-electric locomotive in 1924 (also- 1929 first of that type for passenger use), the largest locomotive at the time in the world in 1941, M-36 tanks and all 3,314 M-7s built, 1,000 of which were present at El Alamein during World War II, and boilers and turret rollers for the US Navy, including those on the USS Missouri. In the late 1940s roughly 80% of all diesel-electric locomotives in service in the US were built at ALCO's Schenectady plant. It was thanks to these industries at opposite edges of Downtown that Schenectady earned the nickname "The City that Lights and Hauls the World".

In the late 1970s, in an effort to boost Downtown and upgrade the city's western entrance, Federal and state Urban Cultural Park grants were used on Mill Street, a small brick-paved street between State and Church streets. Two restaurants opened with great success but later folded during Downtown's continued decline. The project was a failure and was home to abandoned concrete kiosks, planters, and benches all disgraced by graffiti as of 2006. Another failed attempt at urban renewal was the $11 million Canal Square shopping plaza next to Proctor's Theatre in the 1980s. This was praised by then-President of the United States Ronald Reagan as an example of the good that could be done by the smart use of urban renewal money. The shopping plaza, however, failed due to suburban competition. Another proposal that never got off the ground was to level Proctor's for a shopping mall.

In the 1980s, thousands of GE jobs were downsized in Schenectady, and when GE moved the headquarters for its Power Systems division with the hundreds of high paying white-collar jobs with it to Atlanta, Georgia, Schenectady County took action with the creation of the Metroplex Development Authority. Originally envisioned as a way to fund a convention center, it developed into a mechanism for funding private projects through grants and low-interest loans.

=== Renewal ===
Over the first decade of the 21st century, Schenectady's downtown has seen a revival of new construction with businesses new and old moving in or expanding. Much of the renewal can be credited to the Metroplex Development Authority. Created in 1998 one of the earliest large-scale projects funded by Metroplex was the headquarters for MVP Health Plan, a seven-story 175,000-square-foot (16,300 m^{2}) building in 2001, Metroplex paid for the adjacent $11 million parking garage. Metroplex was also involved in giving a $1 million loan that renovated 411 State Street originally intended to lure the Big House brew pub from near-by Albany, when that fell through however Paul Mitchell took over the loan payments and a Paul Mitchell retail store and training school took the space; and a $250,000 grant and $400,000 loan to John D. Marcella Appliances for a $2.4 million 16,750-square-foot (1,556 m^{2}) retail store and distribution center on Broadway.

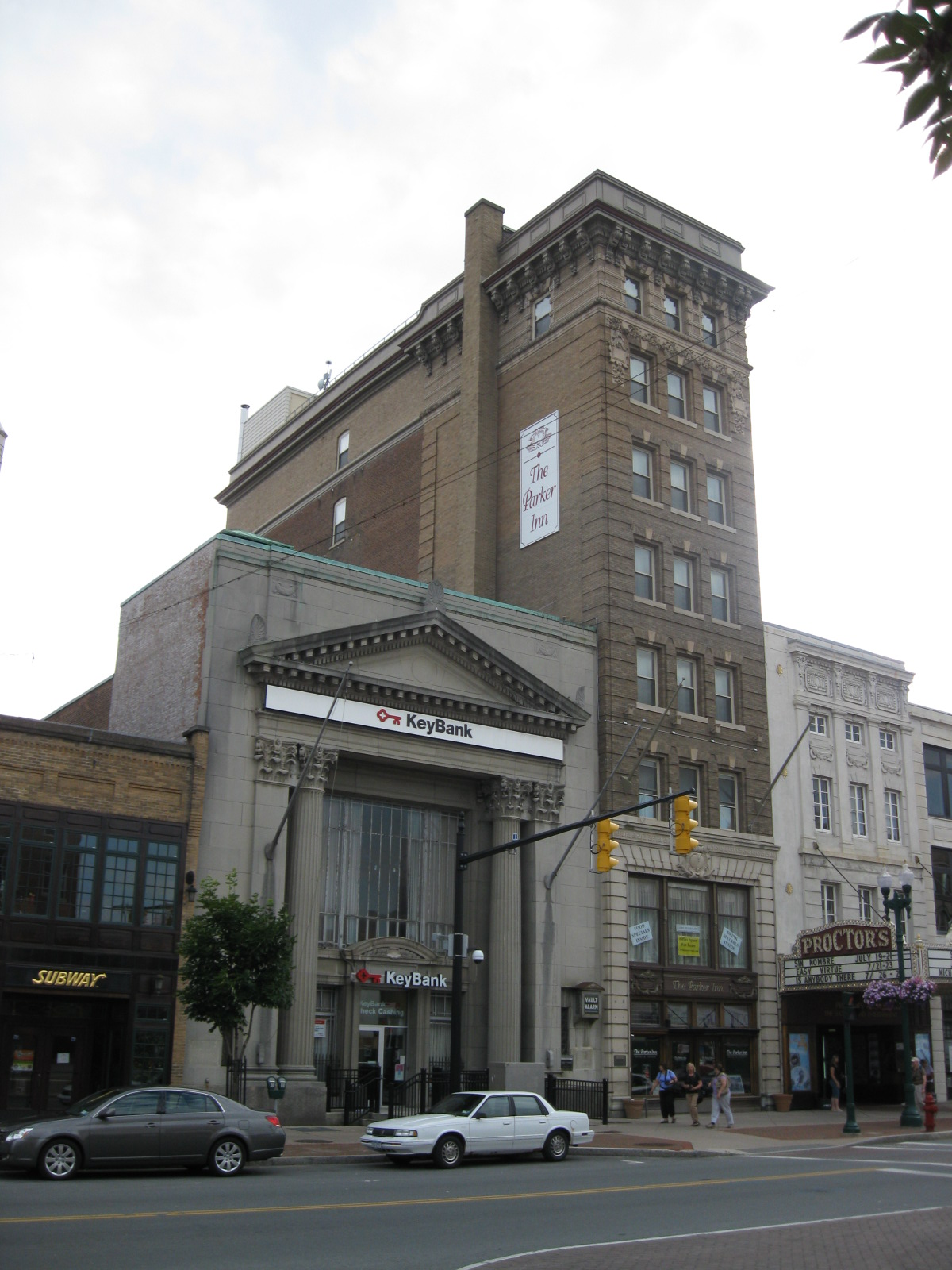
Key Bank branch, Parker Inn (a boutique hotel), and renovated Proctor's Theatre

The renovation and expansion of Proctor's Theatre in 2007 has been seen as the catalyst for the revival and renewed interest in Schenectady's downtown. The renovation cost $30 million and involved building two new theaters including an Iwerks screen, an expanded backstage area that allowed it to attract larger Broadway plays, and a power plant to produce electricity, heat, and air conditioning to the theater and sells excess to the surrounding properties. Prior to the renovation Proctor's had an annual attendance of 150,000 in 2004, five years later Proctor's attendance was 500,000 in 2009. The latest expansion is ongoing next door in a former 100-year-old bank building that had housed a Key Bank branch for the last 33 years. The bank lobby, which will be connected to the arcade at Proctor's will be used for events such as banquets and weddings and is named the Key Hall at Proctor's. At the end of the same block that houses Proctor's was built a movie theater, the Bow Tie Cinema, with office space above housing Siemens AG's Power Technologies International division (Siemens PTI).

The aging city-owned Center City Sportsplex was completely rebuilt as a new YMCA branch along with office space and a bank branch in 2010. That same year the Golub Corporation, parent to Price Chopper Supermarkets, moved from the Schenectady suburb of Rotterdam to Downtown. The location chosen was a former American Locomotive Company (ALCO) site (and later a Big N Supermarket Shopping Plaza) that was heavily polluted. 10,000 tons of dirt and more than 400,000 gallons of contaminated groundwater needed to be removed, state and federal funding assisted in covering the costs. Also in 2010 the State Employee Federal Credit Union's (SEFCU) commercial lending, business banking, and insurance operations moved to Downtown Schenectady into a new 24,000-square-foot (2,200 m^{2}) building, Clinton Square which was renamed SEFCU Square. The block the new building occupies was once home to several pizza parlors and had earned the nickname of Pizza Block.

The redevelopment has led to a better business environment and a better image of the downtown by residents throughout the county with 80% of county residents reporting they visit Downtown and 82% saying they have an improved view of Downtown according to a Siena Research Institute survey commissioned by Metroplex in 2008. On January 8, 2007, however, U.S. News & World Report published an article in which the author discussed the city's industrial past, as home to General Electric and the American Locomotive Company, and then the city's steady loss of thousands of GE jobs and the closure of the locomotive plant in the late 1960s as emblematic of Upstate New York's urban decline. Schenectady Mayor Brian Stratton responded in a letter to US News that was published in the January 29 – February 6 edition citing that the article failed to note the $150 million invested in downtown over the previous three years, including the new movie theater, hotel, restaurants, offices, and Proctor's expansion. Redevelopment of Downtown Schenectady continues, especially along State Street near Proctor's Theatre, with the Metroplex Development Authority's purchase of the Foster Building at 508 State Street along with the neighboring parcels of 510 and 512 State Street and 204 Lafayette Street. The Foster Building is a former hotel on the National Register of Historic Places.

== Demographics ==
In 2010 Downtown Schenectady had a population of 4,139, which was an increase of 15.8% from 1990. There are 1,582 housing units in the neighborhood with an average of 3.48 residents per household. 10.2% of the housing units are owner occupied while 90.8% are renter occupied.

The median age Downtown is 24.9, which is the youngest in the city. Between 1990 and 2000 the school age population increased by 143.2% and the adult population by less than 1.0%. The 0–4 pre-school population in the neighborhood declined by 26.5% between 1990 and 2000 while the elderly population increased by 27.6%.

The median income for Downtown residents was $18,939 in 2010. 82.2% of neighborhood residents were considered low-income, while 62.5% were very low income and 38.2% lived below the poverty level. Minorities comprise 51.9% of the residents.

== Geography ==
Downtown Schenectady occupies approximately 340 acres (140 ha) of the northwestern portion of the city of Schenectady. Downtown Schenectady surrounds the Stockade neighborhood which is to the west along with the Mohawk River.

== Land use ==
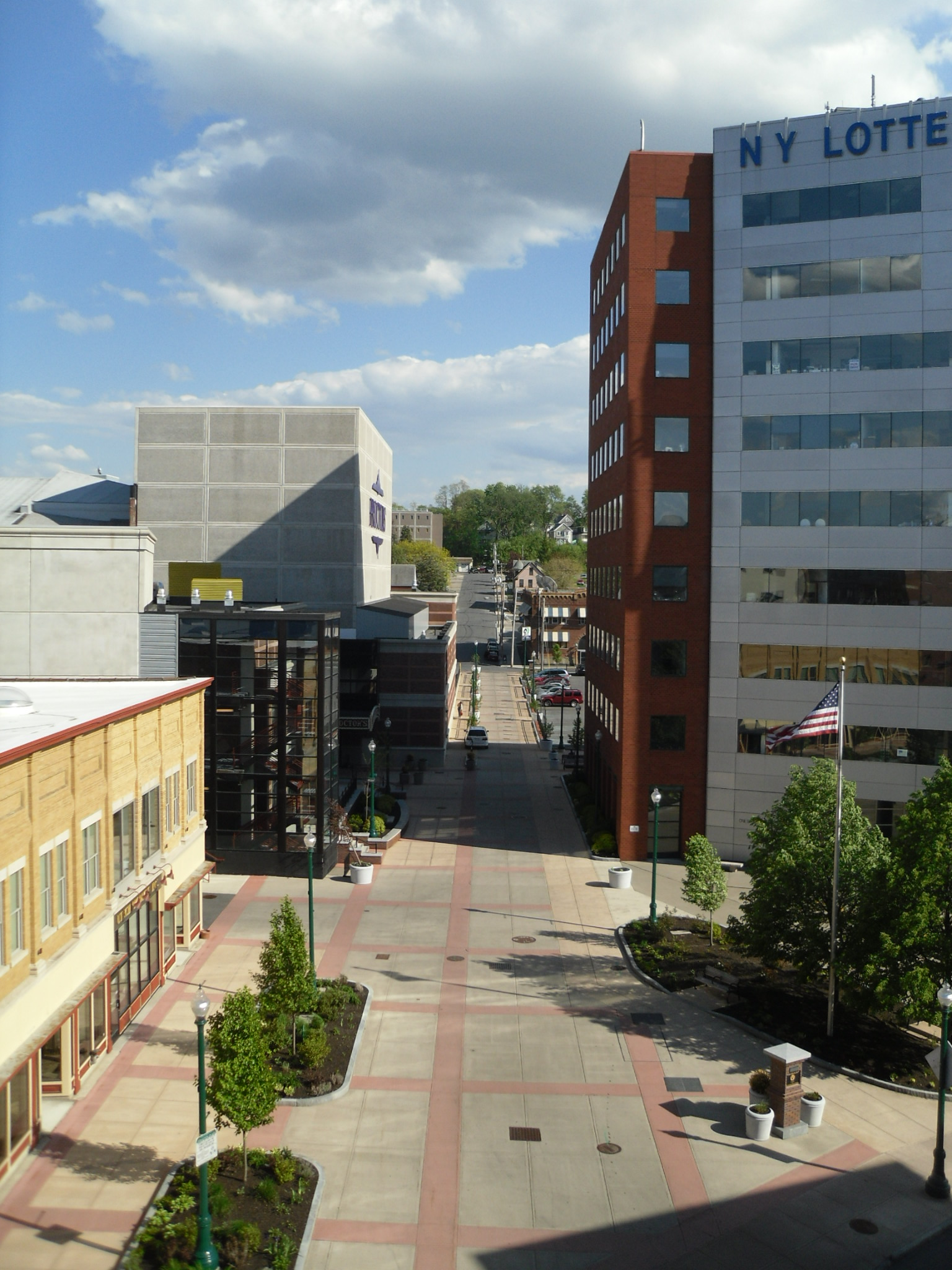
One Broadway Center, home to the New York Lottery, at nine stories tall is Schenectady's tallest building.

Of Downtown's approximately 340 acres (140 ha) community service properties comprise 43% of land area, with commercial properties at 32%. Apartments and public service use make up only about 5% of land use. Of the residential units 25.7% are in two family structures and 16.7% are in structures with 5 to 9 units. 66.6% of Downtown housing structures were built before 1940. 7% of the land Downtown is vacant. About 69% of the neighborhood is tax-exempt, which is the highest percentage among the city's neighborhood; this is due to the concentration of education (Schenectady County Community College and Union College), and government institutions.

Downtown Schenectady has a number of buildings that are on the National Register of Historic Places, including the Schenectady City Hall, the Schenectady Post Office, the Schenectady Armory, the Nott Memorial, Proctor's Theatre, the Hotel Van Curler, Central Fire Station, and the Foster Building. In addition, the block bounded by Jay, Liberty, Broadway, and Franklin streets has been a historic district since 2006.

== Transportation ==
Downtown Schenectady's main commercial arteries are State Street, Erie Boulevard, and Broadway. The Western Gateway Bridge carries NY Route 5 (State Street) across the Mohawk River to the village of Scotia. Interstate 890 is at the western edge of Erie Boulevard and connects Downtown to the New York State Thruway. Downtown Schenectady is home to an Amtrak station and to a bus station served by Greyhound Lines.

== Recreation ==
Downtown Schenectady has three parks- South Avenue Park, Liberty Park and Veteran's Park. Liberty Park and Veteran's Park are passive parks with memorials, while South Avenue Park is a .35-acre (0.14 ha) park that includes a basketball court and playground. There is a YMCA located on State Street with exercise equipment, a spin studio, sauna, steam room and an NCAA regulation-sized basketball court that hosts the Schenectady County Community College basketball and volleyball teams.

== Entertainment ==
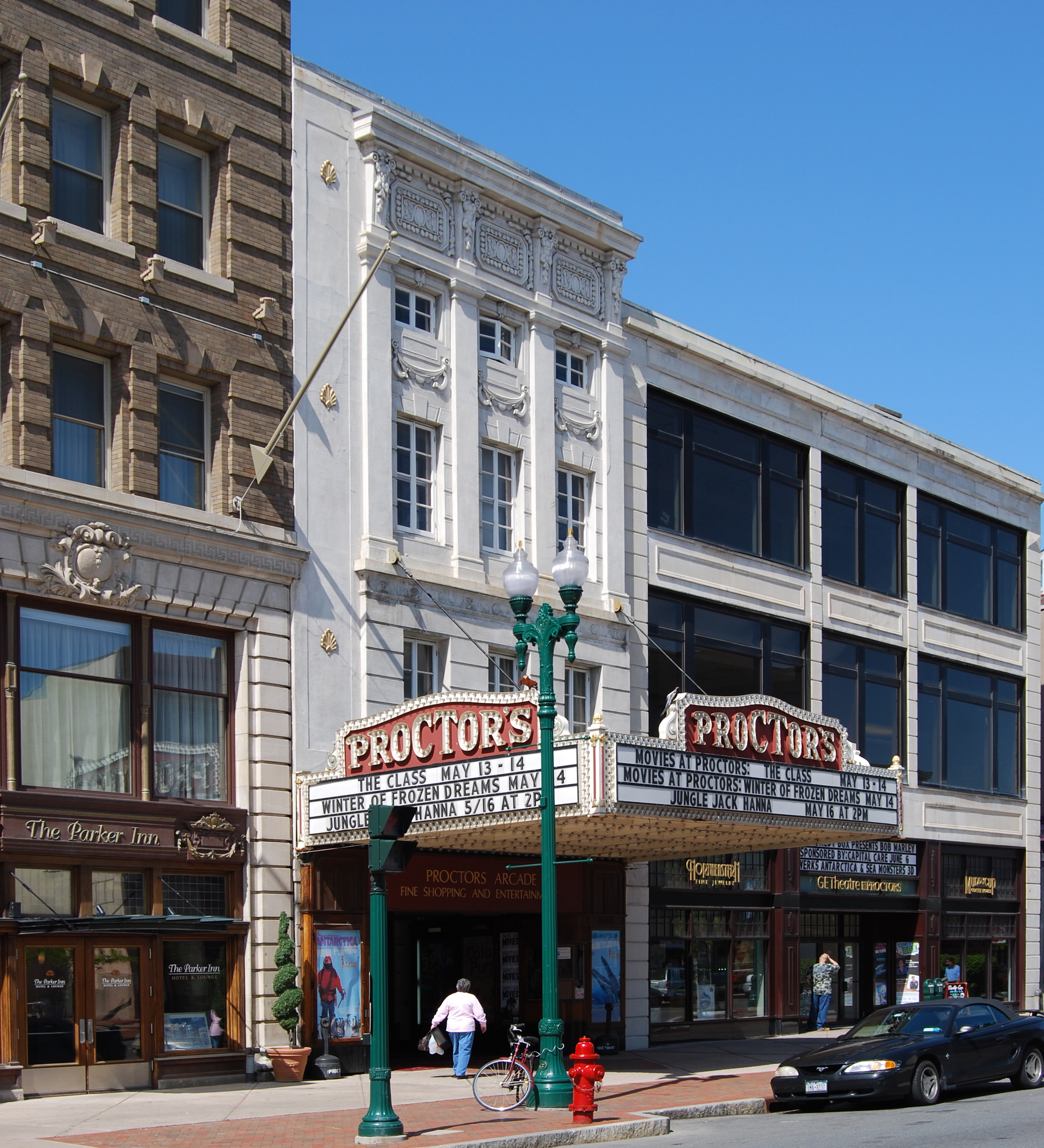
Proctor's Theatre in 2009.

Proctor's Theatre is one of the Capital District's premier entertainment venues with over 600 events a year. Along with Broadway plays, musical concerts, and opera, Proctor's also hosts a farmer's market, shows live opera from the La Scala opera house in Italy and movies, including Iwerks films, and offers eight summer camps for children on topics such as jazz, chess, and filmmaking. Proctor's also hosts 50 to 60 conferences each year along with numerous private parties. Jay Street is a pedestrian street which links State Street from across Proctor's to City Hall at North Jay and Union streets. It is home to roughly 20 businesses including boutiques, bookstores, restaurants, and offices. Jay Street is also home to Jay Street Studios, which provides low-cost rent commercial space to professional artists and includes the Schenectady Museum's Innovations gift shop.

Downtown Schenectady is also host to many cultural events throughout the year, such as the Urban Arts Show with over 500 artist's works, Jazz on Jay which is a free noon-time concert held on the corner of Jay and State street, and the annual Schenectady County SummerNight which includes live music, carnival games, and fireworks.

== Crime ==
According to police statistics (in 2006) Downtown Schenectady experiences less crime than other areas of the city. Panhandling however has been a continued quality of life issue for Downtown. The Schenectady Police Department (SPD) is the seventh largest police force in the state of New York with headquarters located Downtown on Liberty Street next to the library and across from City Hall. The SPD also maintains a satellite office on Jay Street near Proctor's.

== Education ==
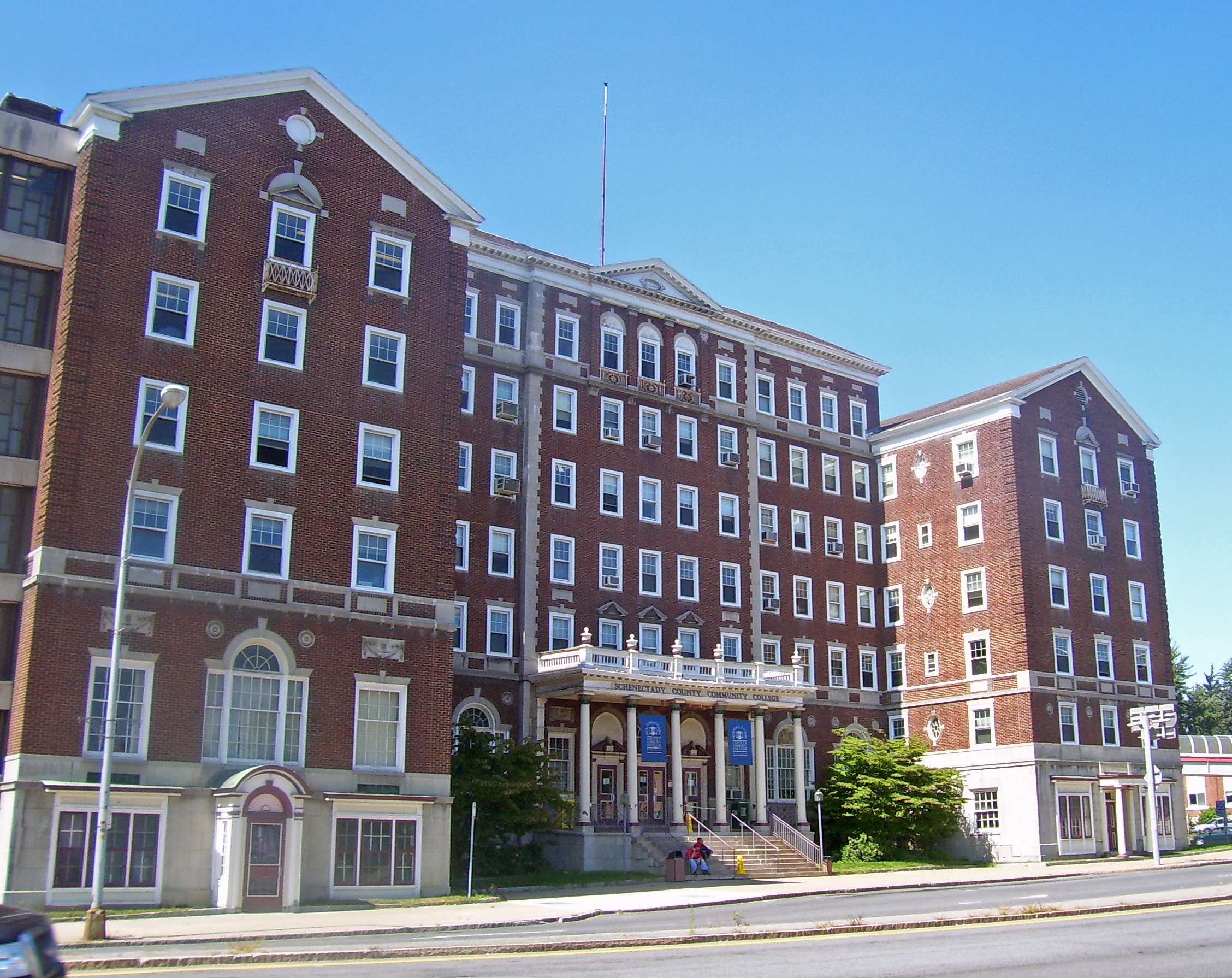
Hotel Van Curler, today Elston Hall, the first building occupied by the Schenectady County Community College.

Downtown Schenectady is home to the Schenectady County Community College, a two-year community college and Union College a private four-year college. In 2003 Union Graduate College became an independent college in association with Union College and the other colleges of Union University. In 2009 the college opened its own location on the corner of Liberty and Nott Terrace in Downtown a block from Union College. That location was once the home to Schenectady High School from 1903 to 1974 (known as Nott Terrace High from 1931).

The main branch of the Schenectady County Public Library is located downtown and is undergoing in 2010 a $2.6 million expansion that will add 6,700 square feet (620 m^{2}) with a new children's room and up-to-date technology.
