= Barre Firehouse Weathervane =

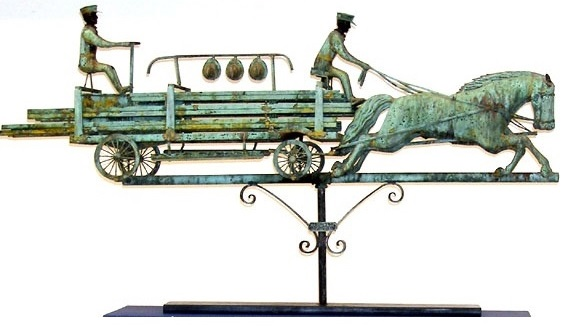
Barre City, Vermont Firehouse Weathervane.

The Barre Firehouse Weathervane is a hammered cooper weathervane that used to sit atop the Firehouse in Barre, Vermont. Created in 1904, the weathervane depicts a “flying team” of horses pulling a hook and ladder wagon. It is currently displayed in the Vermont History Center also in downtown Barre.

== About ==
The 1904 Barre Firehouse Weathervane remains an important part of Barre's history. Custom-designed especially for the fire station built in 1904 on South Main Street, the weathervane remained atop of the former firehouse for nearly a century. The hammered copper weathervane symbolized Barre's growing prosperity as the granite capital of the world.

== History ==
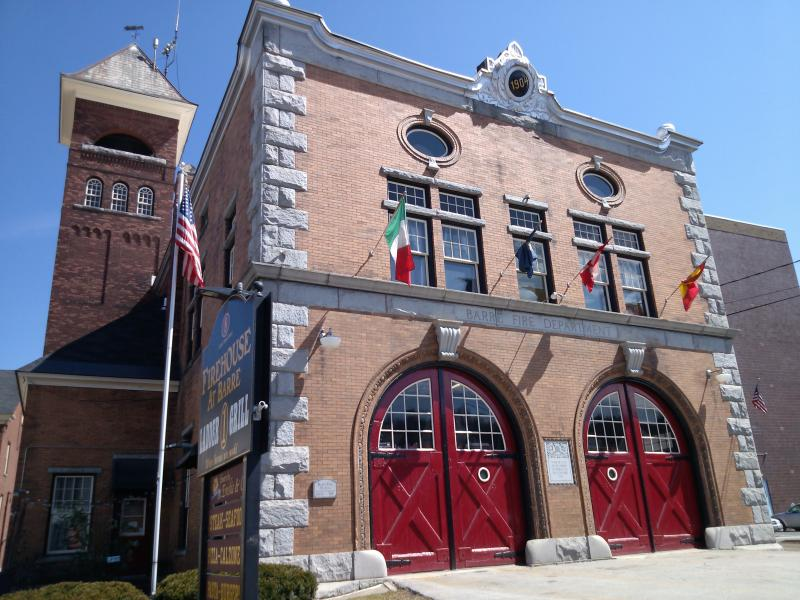
Barre City Vermont's 1904 firehouse. Drying tower that housed weather vane visible at left. The firehouse is now home to a restaurant and other businesses.

At the turn of the 20th century, Barre needed a “more commodious and central” firehouse than the old station in Depot Square. During the summer of 1904, a special committee appointed by the mayor recommended building a new station modeled after the firehouse in Quincy, Massachusetts. Work began immediately and the construction was almost completed by December. The new building featured eight horse stalls, a club room, reading room and sleeping quarters for “the best men anywhere in New England, outside the city of Boston,” boasted the Fire Committee in the city's annual report. They had good reason to boast for the city council managed to get the job done – from purchasing the property to installing the huge weathervane – in a little over six months and for a total cost of $25,000.

The City commissioned W. A. Snow & Company of Boston to create the new fire station's weathervane for the sum of $75. (Known primarily as a foundry, Snow & Company also forged the iron door hinges used throughout the building.) Perched atop the station's tall drying tower used to hang wet fire hoses, the showpiece was impressive in both size and artistry. The weathervane depicts a “flying team” of horses pulling a hook and ladder wagon. The copper sculpture measures nearly 6-feet long by 3-feet high. Its iron pole stands almost 8-feet tall, and the four copper directionals span 3-feet wide.

== Restoration and display ==
City officials moved the weathervane in 1984 and placed it on display in the Aldrich Public Library. With 80 years of weather taking its toll on the hand-hammered copper, the vane received restoration and repairs by a professional conservation firm in 1993. Recent security concerns prompted the city to remove the weathervane from the library. Today, weathervanes are prized as decorative folk art and examples of early American craftsmanship. It is noteworthy that Vermont’s own Shelburne Museum led the way in first collecting and preserving rare and unique vanes from across the country. Preserved and protected in climate-controlled facilities, these artifacts can be safely viewed and studied by the public.

The Vermont Historical Society is currently partnering with the City to provide public display for this historic piece of Barre’s past. Both the City of Barre and the Vermont Historical Society hope that the Barre Historic Firehouse Weathervane will be enjoyed and treasured by generations of Vermonters to come.

== Sources ==
- "The Barre Firehouse Weathervane." Informational Handout. Vermont Historical Society. 2011.
