= Penn Varney =

American architect

- Born: November 15, 1859; Wolfeboro, New Hampshire
- Died: April 27, 1949 (aged 89); Rowley, Massachusetts
- Occupation: Architect

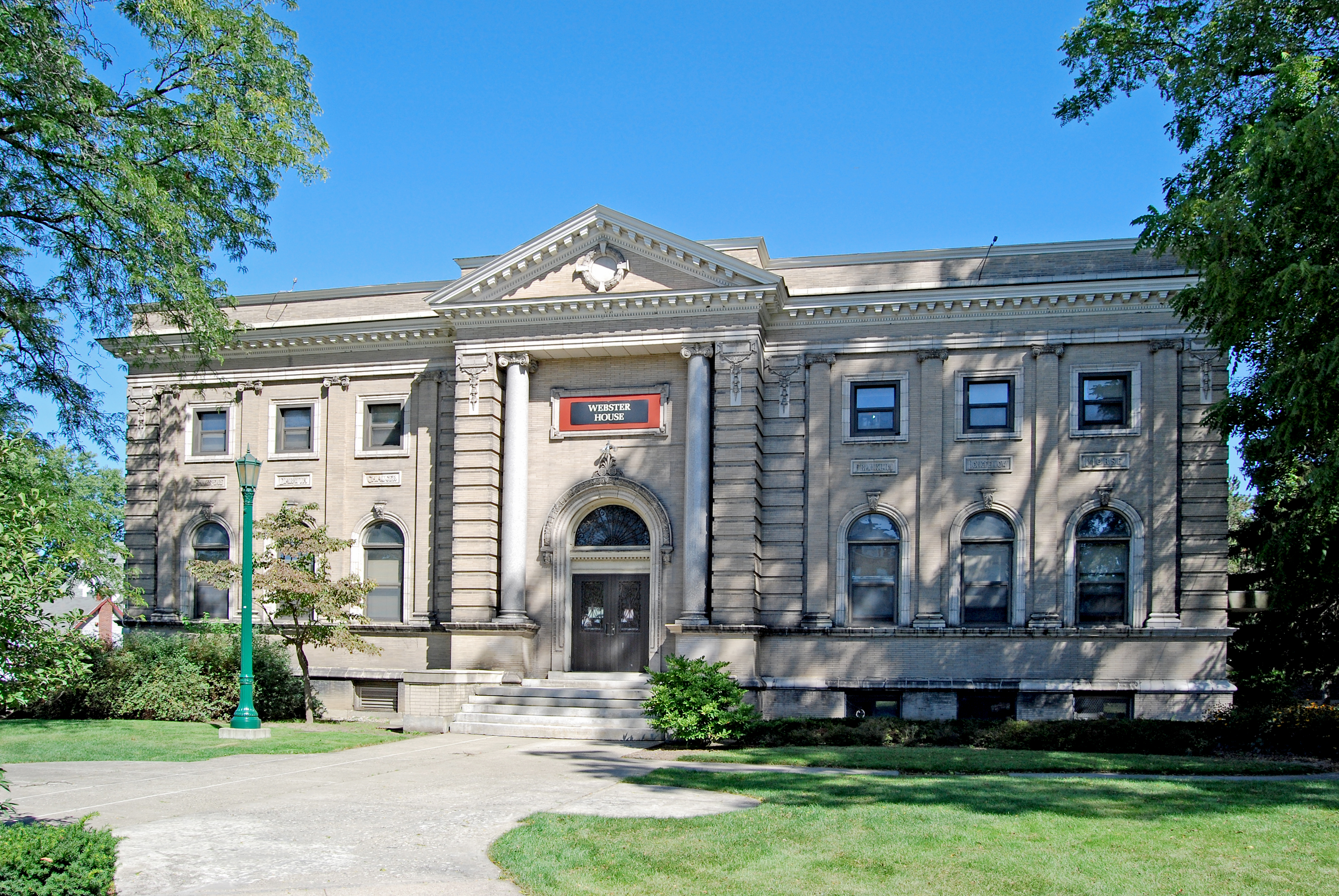
The former Schenectady Public Library, completed in 1903

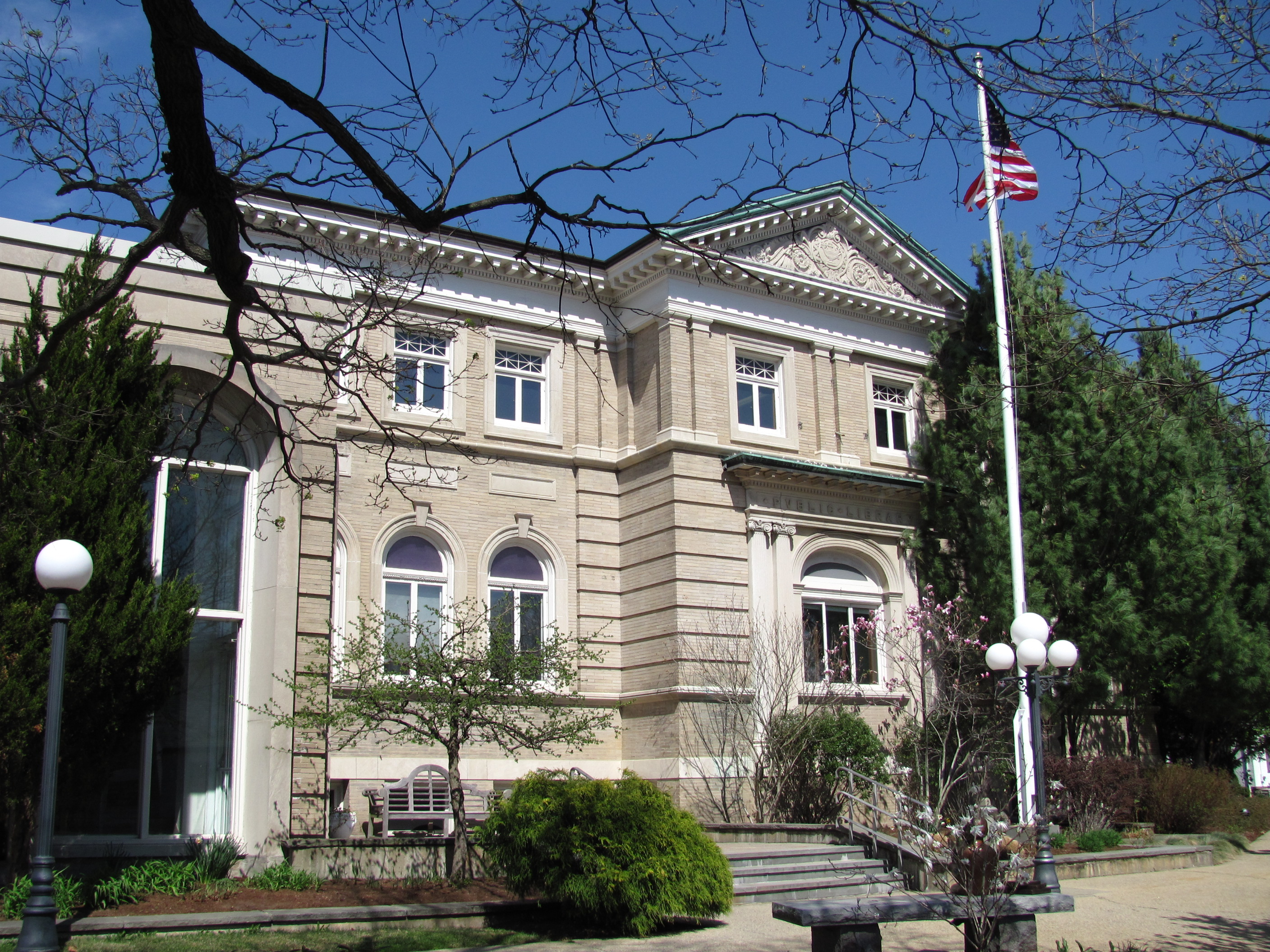
The Melrose Public Library, completed in 1904

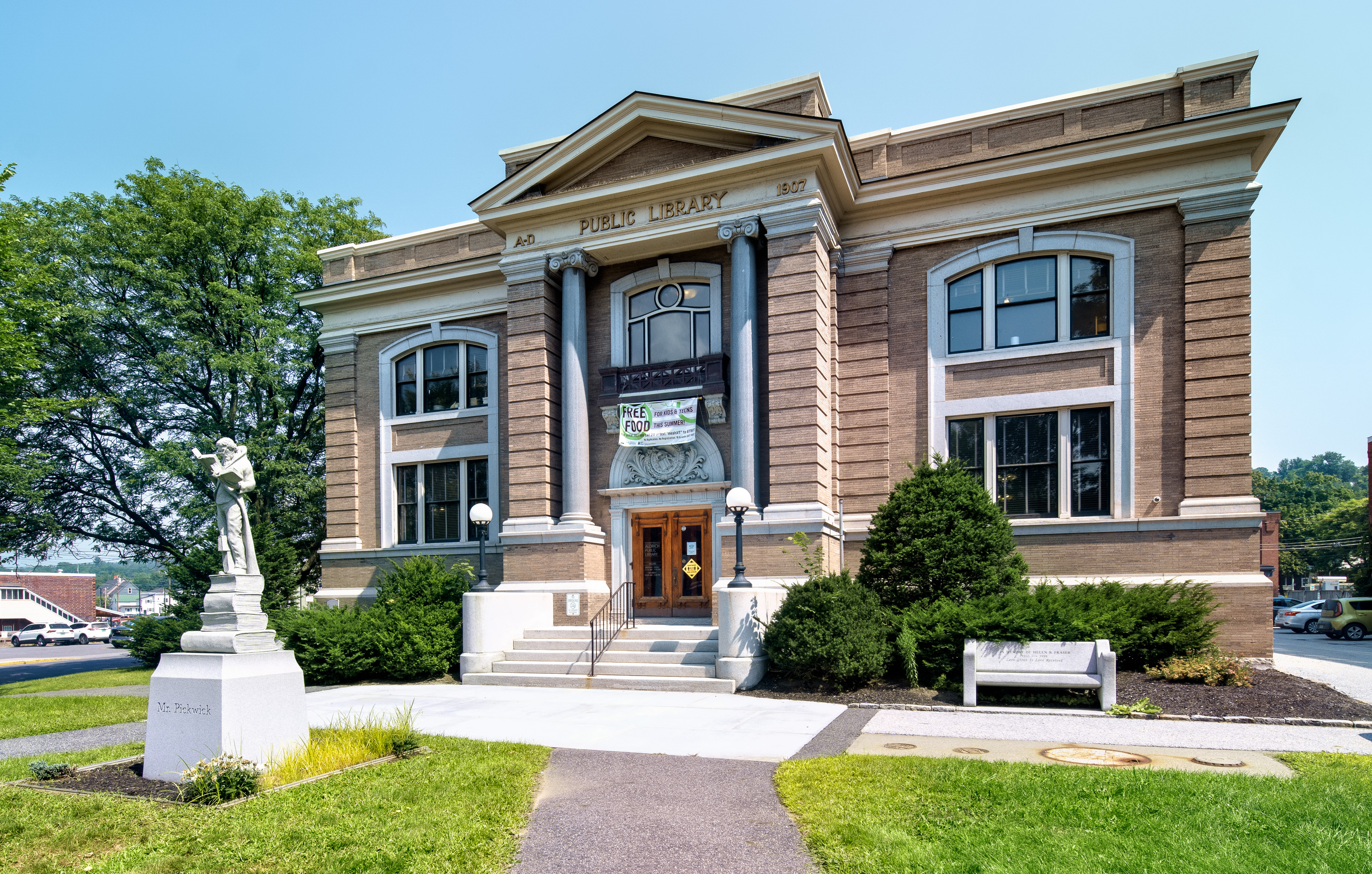
The Aldrich Public Library in Barre, Vermont, completed in 1908

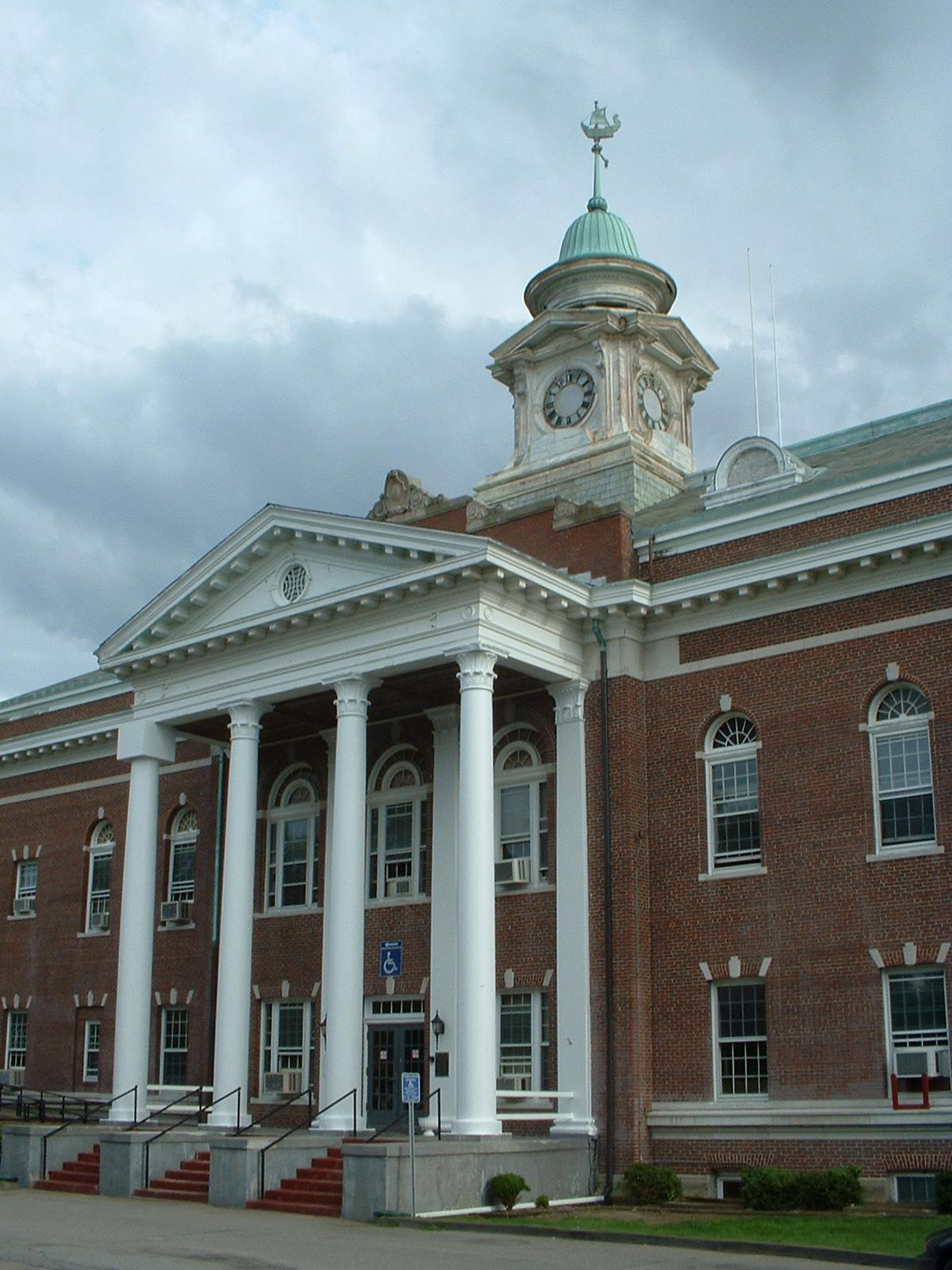
The Hull Town Hall, completed in 1921

Penn Varney (1859–1949) was an American architect in practice in Lynn, Massachusetts, during the late nineteenth and early twentieth centuries.

== Life and career ==
Penn Varney was born November 15, 1859, in Wolfeboro, New Hampshire, to Augustus J. Varney, a sawmill owner, and Mercy (Hussey) Varney. He was educated in the local schools, and in 1882 moved to Lynn where he was first employed by architect Holman K. Wheeler as a drafter. In 1888 he left Wheeler to open his own office. During the first few years he was in partnership with Alfred W. Call in the firm of Call & Varney. Varney practiced architecture in Lynn for at least forty years.

== Personal life ==
In 1893 Varney was married to Emma L. Hussey, and they had one son. In later life they lived in Rowley, Massachusetts. Varney died there April 27, 1949.

== Legacy ==
At least five buildings designed by Varney have been listed on the United States National Register of Historic Places, and others contribute to listed historic districts.

The Alabama architect William Leslie Welton received his initial architectural training in Varney's office.

== Architectural works ==
- Charles F. Piper house, 22-24 N Main St, Wolfeboro, New Hampshire (1892)
- Danversport School (former), 10 West St, Danvers, Massachusetts (1893–94)
- East Lynn Odd Fellows Building, 301 Essex St, Lynn, Massachusetts (1895)
- Marcy Street School, Marcy St, Southbridge, Massachusetts (1898, demolished)
- St. Joseph R. C. School, 29 Green St, Lynn, Massachusetts (1898)
- Amesbury Public Library, 149 Main St, Amesbury, Massachusetts (1900)
- Schenectady Public Library (former), (Note: Now Webster House of Union College.) Union St and Seward Pl, Schenectady, New York (1901–03)
- Henry S. De Forest house, (Note: A contributing property to the Union Street Historic District, NRHP-listed in 1982.) 718 Union St, Schenectady, New York (1902)
- Melrose Public Library, 69 W Emerson St, Melrose, Massachusetts (1903–04, NRHP 1988)
- Miller Building, 522 Congress St, Portland, Maine (1904, NRHP 1996)
- Aldrich Public Library, 6 Washington St, Barre, Vermont (1907–08, NRHP 2015)
- Foster Building, 508 State St, Schenectady, New York (1907, NRHP 1991)
- Masonic Hall, (Note: A contributing property to the Saco Historic District, NRHP-listed in 1998.) 258 Main St, Saco, Maine (1907)
- Sanford City Hall, 919 Main St, Sanford, Maine (1907)
- Depositors Trust Company Building, (Note: A contributing property to the Skowhegan Historic District, NRHP-listed in 1982.) 33 Water St, Skowhegan, Maine (1909)
- Lynn Classical High School (former), 33 N Common St, Lynn, Massachusetts (1909–11)
- Elks Lodge, Division St, Amsterdam, New York (1910, demolished)
- Central Fire Station, (Note: A contributing property to the Central Square Historic District, NRHP-listed in 1990.) 25 Central St, Stoneham, Massachusetts (1916, NRHP 1984)
- Hull Town Hall, 253 Atlantic Ave, Hull, Massachusetts (1919–21)
- Colonel Nathaniel Shatswell School (former), 15 Green St, Ipswich, Massachusetts (1925–26)
- Salisbury Police and Fire Station (former), 18–24 Railroad Ave, Salisbury Beach, Massachusetts (1929)
