= Porteous, Mitchell and Braun Company Building =

- U.S. National Register of Historic Places
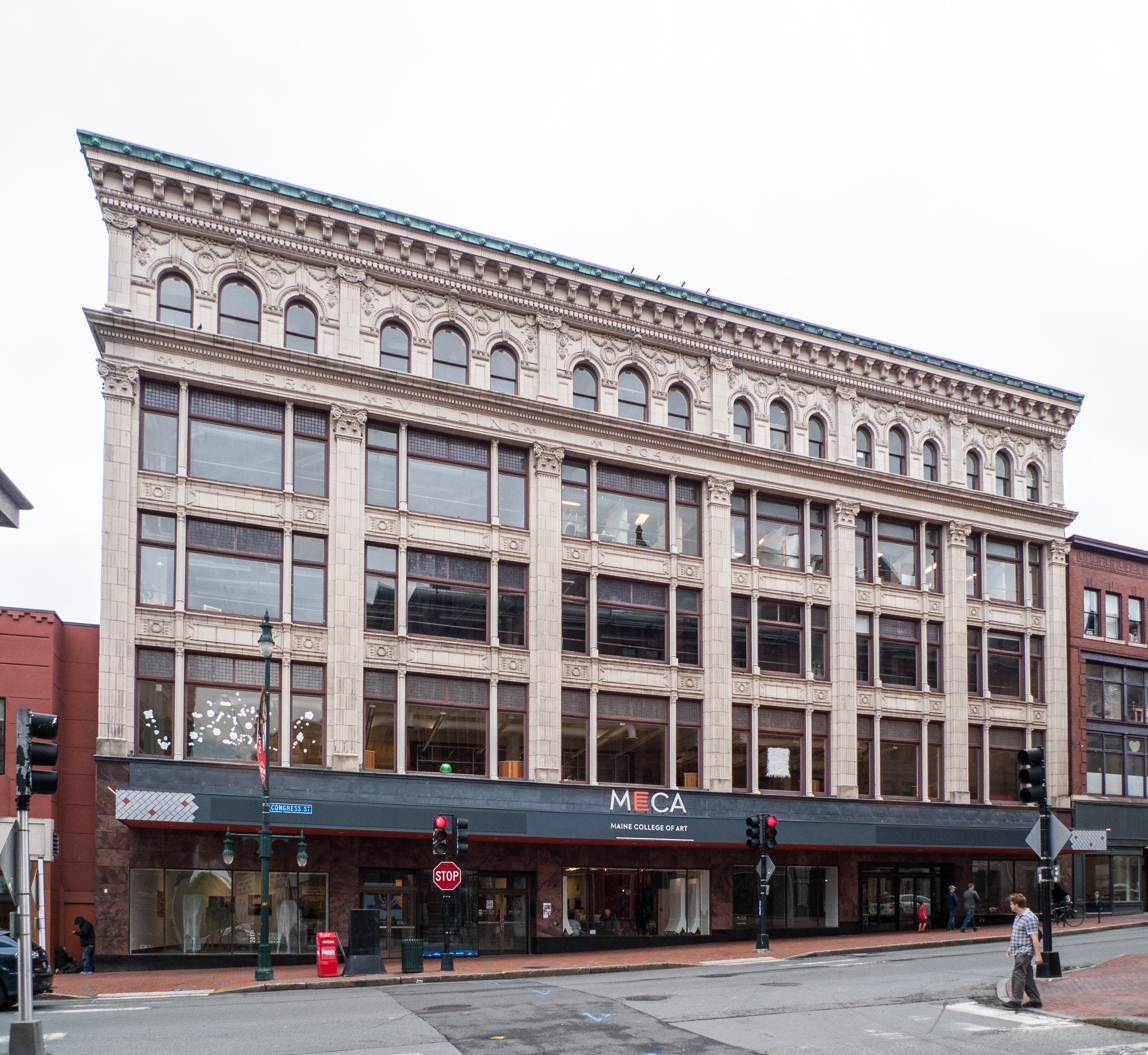

- Location within Maine Location within the United States
- Location: 522-528 Congress Street, Portland, Maine
- Coordinates: 43°39′21″N 70°15′40″W
- Area: less than one acre
- Built: 1904; 1911
- Architect: Penn Varney (1904); George Burnham (1911)
- Architectural style: Renaissance
- NRHP reference No.: 96001039
- Added to NRHP: September 27, 1996

The Porteous, Mitchell and Braun Company Building (also known as the Miller Building) is a historic building at 522-528 Congress Street in downtown Portland, Maine. Built in 1904 and enlarged in 1911, it housed Porteous, which was Maine's largest department store for many years. The building is a fine example Renaissance Revival architecture and was listed on the National Register of Historic Places in 1996. It now houses the primary campus facilities of the Maine College of Art & Design.

== Description and history ==
The Porteous, Mitchell and Braun Company Building is located in Portland's Arts District at the upper end of Congress Street. It occupies the middle portion of a city block on the south side of Congress Street, between Oak and Brown Streets. It is a five-story structure, with a steel frame and brick walls clad in limestone-colored terra cotta. The ground floor facade is entirely modern, with glass and stone, and is topped by a marquee identifying the building's current occupant, the Maine College of Art. The second through fourth floors are divided into six bays, articulated by fluted pilasters. Each bay houses a three-part window, with a larger central pane separated by smaller side ones by slender engaged columns. Between the floors are decorative panels. The top floor is separated from the others by a dentillated cornice, and also has six bays separated by pilasters, each bay housing three round-arch windows. A corbelled cornice tops the structure.

The building was constructed in 1904 to plans by architect Penn Varney of Lynn, Massachusetts, for the Portland dry goods firm of Watson, Miller & Company, and was originally three bays wide. In 1906 that firm was acquired by the Connecticut retailer Porteous, Mitchell and Braun, which doubled the building's size in 1911, and commissioned the unifying facade from local architect George Burnham. Further expansions enlarged the building to the rear, reaching Free Street by 1953. Porteous operated on the premises until 1991, and was for many years the city's leading department store. The building then underwent restoration and adaptation for use by the Maine College of Art.

== See also ==
- National Register of Historic Places listings in Portland, Maine
- Charles Q. Clapp House, MECA's former home
- Everett Chambers, MECA's dormitory
