= Barre Downtown Historic District =

Historic district in Vermont, United States

- U.S. National Register of Historic Places
- U.S. Historic district
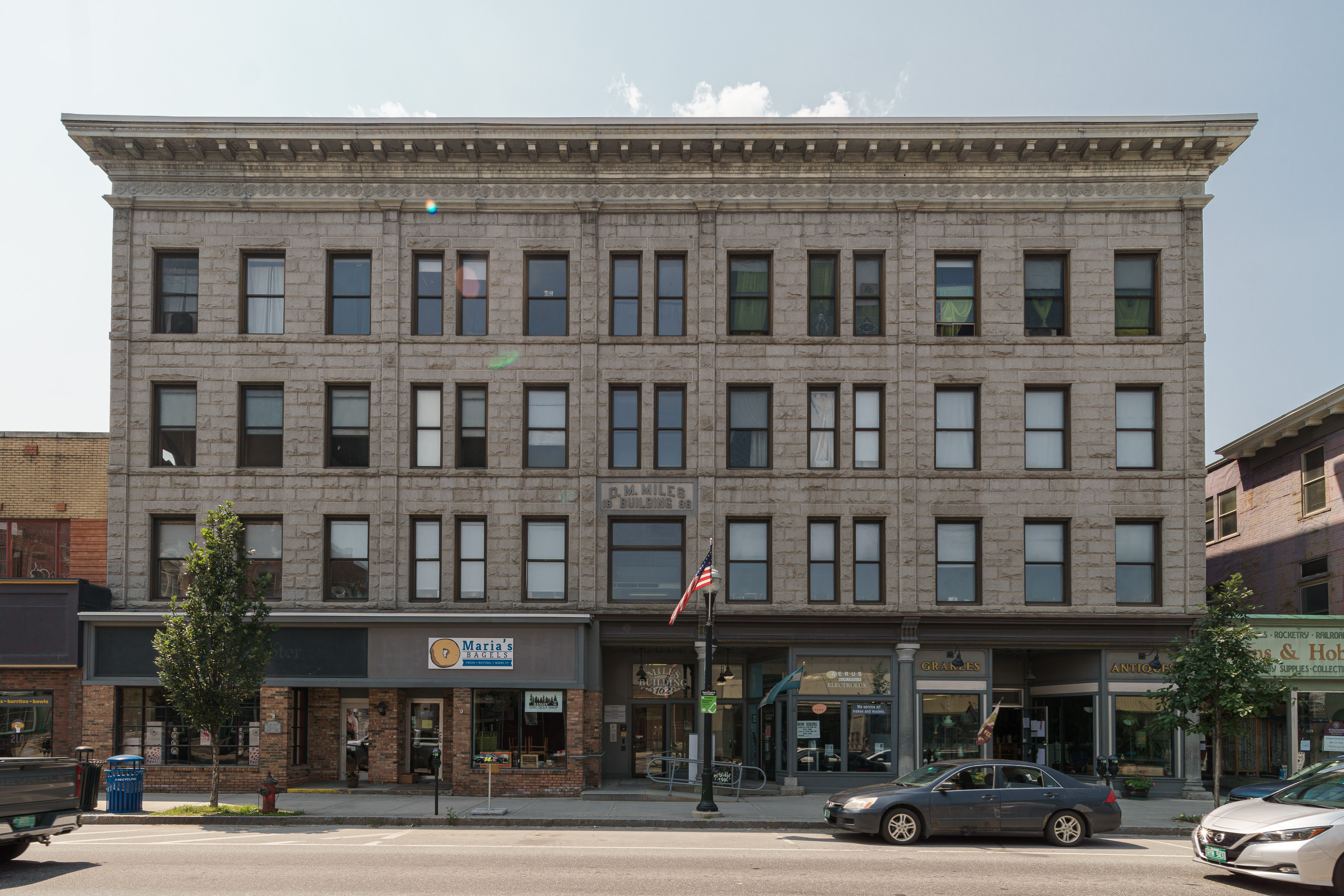
- Miles Block (1898) features one of the most extensive uses of local granite in its construction

- Location within Vermont Location within the United States
- Location: US 302, Barre, Vermont
- Coordinates: 44°11′50″N 72°30′9″W
- Area: 25 acres (10 ha)
- Built: 1875
- Architectural style: Italianate, Queen Anne, Greek Revival
- NRHP reference No.: 79000227
- Added to NRHP: September 4, 1979

The Barre Downtown Historic District encompasses the historic commercial and civic heart of the city of Barre, Vermont. Extending along Main Street from City Park to Depot Square, this area was developed quite rapidly in the 1880s and 1890s, when the area experienced rapid growth due to the expansion of the nearby granite quarries. It was listed on the National Register of Historic Places in 1979.

== Description and history ==
Barre was primarily a small sleepy agricultural community until it was joined to the national railroad network by the Central Vermont Railway in 1875. Granite had been quarried in the surrounding hills as early as the early 19th century, but the arrival of that railroad connection, and another directly to the quarries in 1888, rapidly accelerated development of the granite industry. This transformed what had been a modest village into a full-fledged city (incorporated in 1895), including the construction of the commercial and civic buildings which line North Main Street and City Park, most built between 1880 and 1925.

The district is mostly linear, extending along North Main Street (US 302) between Depot Square and City Park. City Park is a triangular park formed by Washington, Church, and North Main Streets, and is ringed by civic and religious buildings, which form the southeastern end of the district. Despite the significance of granite to the local economy, most of the buildings are of primarily brick construction. They are in a diversity of styles, from late examples of Italianate architecture, built in the 1880s, to Classical Revival and Romanesque building from the 1890s and 1900s. The 1898 Miles Block (158-168 North Main) exhibits one of the most extensive uses of local granite in its construction.

Other contributing properties include:

- Universalist Church, 19 Church Street
- United States Post Office, 3 South Main Street
- First Baptist Church, 24 Washington Street
- Hedding Methodist Church, 40 Washington Street
- Masonic Temple, 2 Academy Street
- Quinlen Block, 170-174 N. Main Street
- Aldrich Building, 47 N. Main Street, a trapezoidal building
- Barre City Hall and Opera House
- Aldrich Public Library
- Barre Fire Station, 8 South Main Street, now a restaurant
- Granite Block, 36-40 North Main Street
- Masonic Temple, 2 Academy Street. It has a monumental pedimented Tuscan portico, Masonic Temple signage, and offices extension to the rear which were added in 1929 to a c.1830-built Greek Revival house.

== Gallery ==
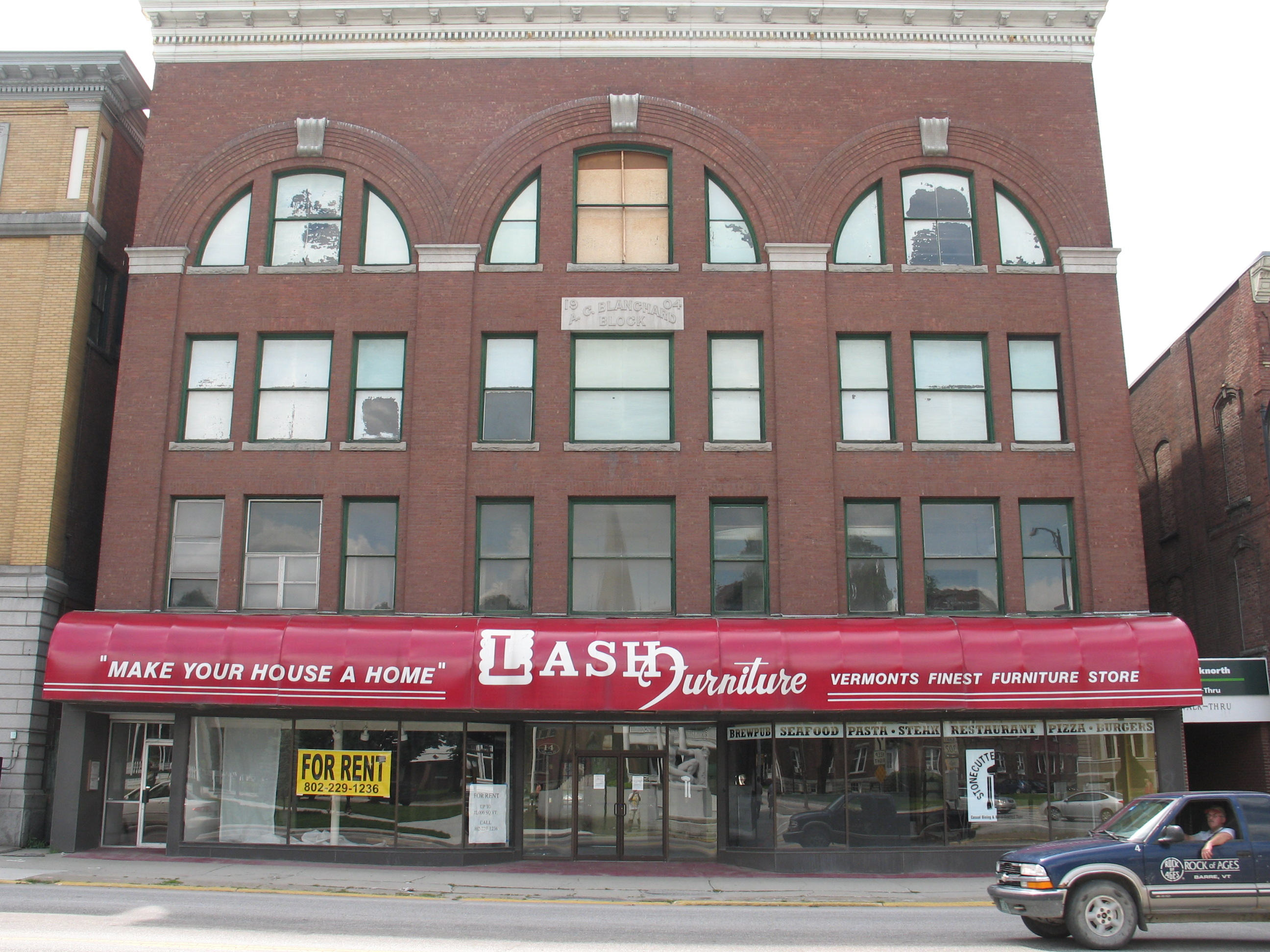
A. C. Blanchard Block

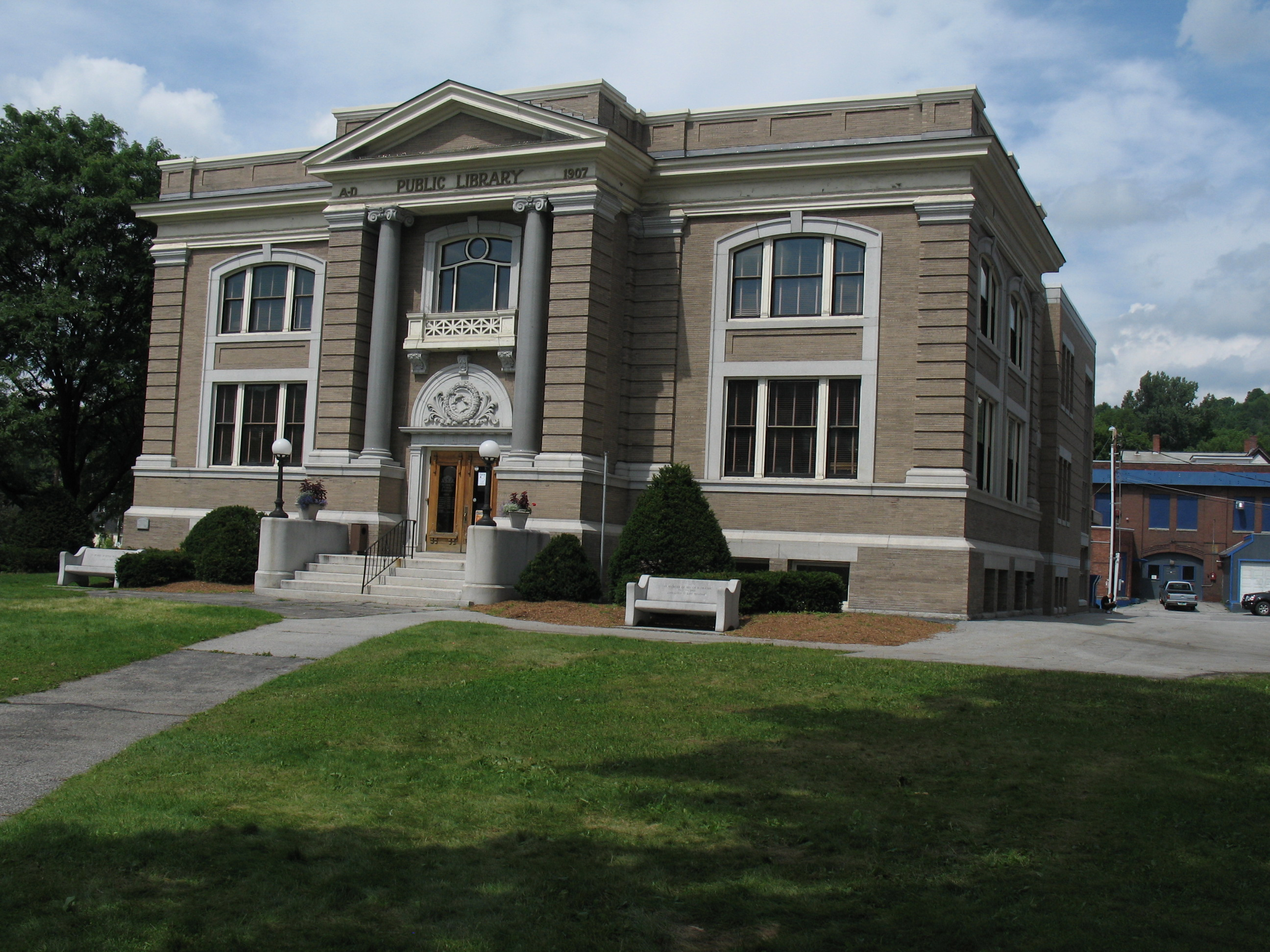
Aldrich Public Library

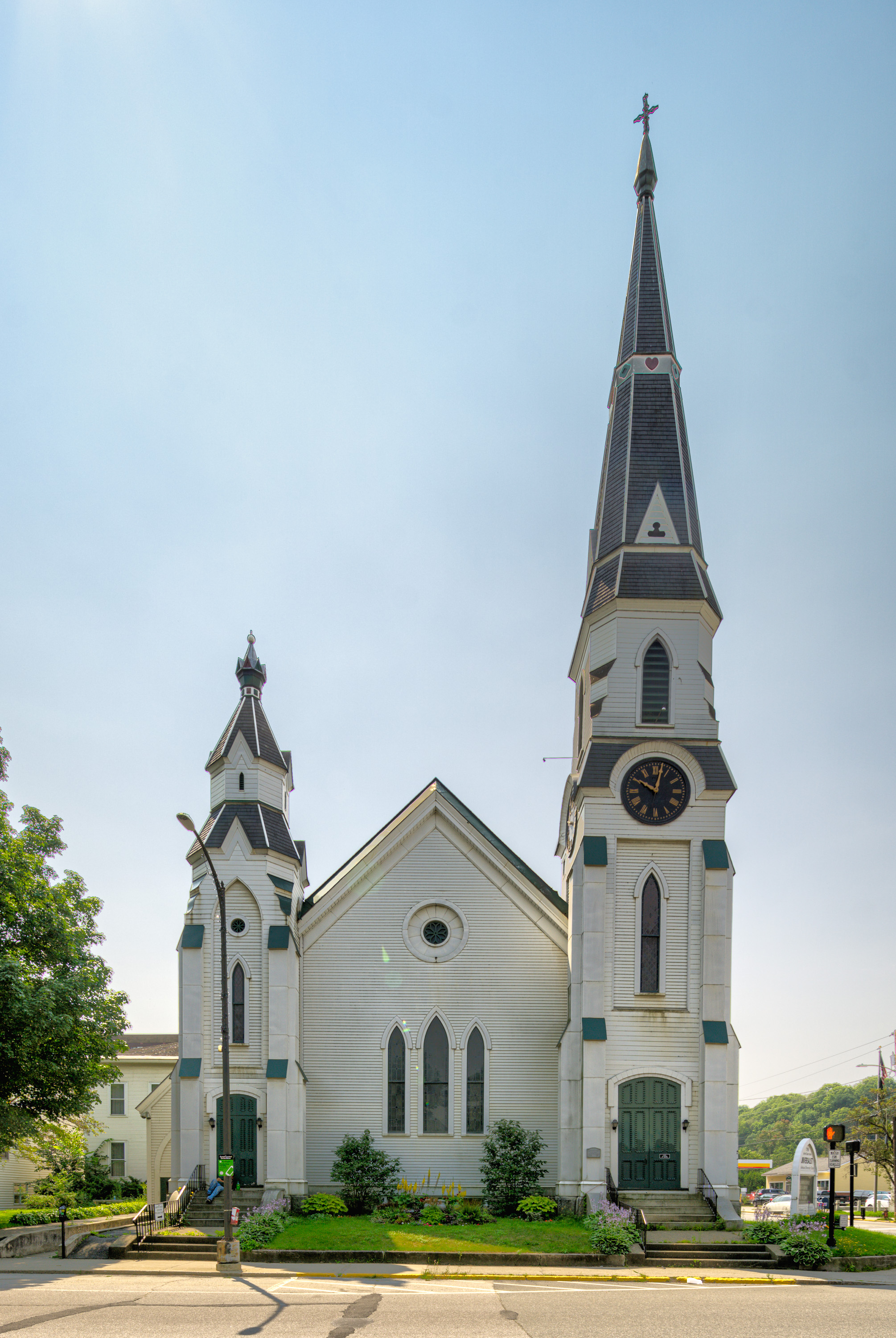
Universalist Church, 19 Church Street

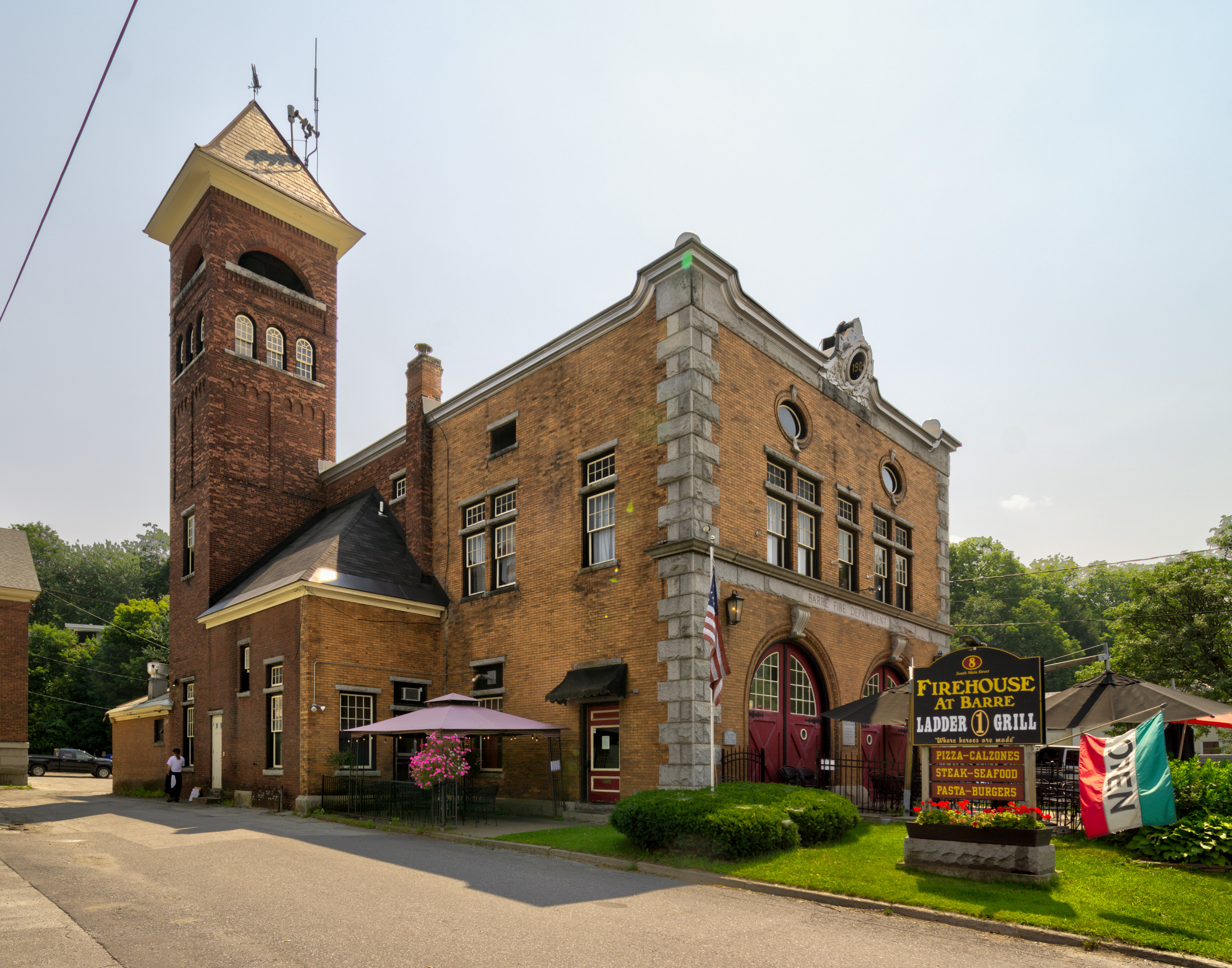
Former Barre Fire Station, 8 South Main Street

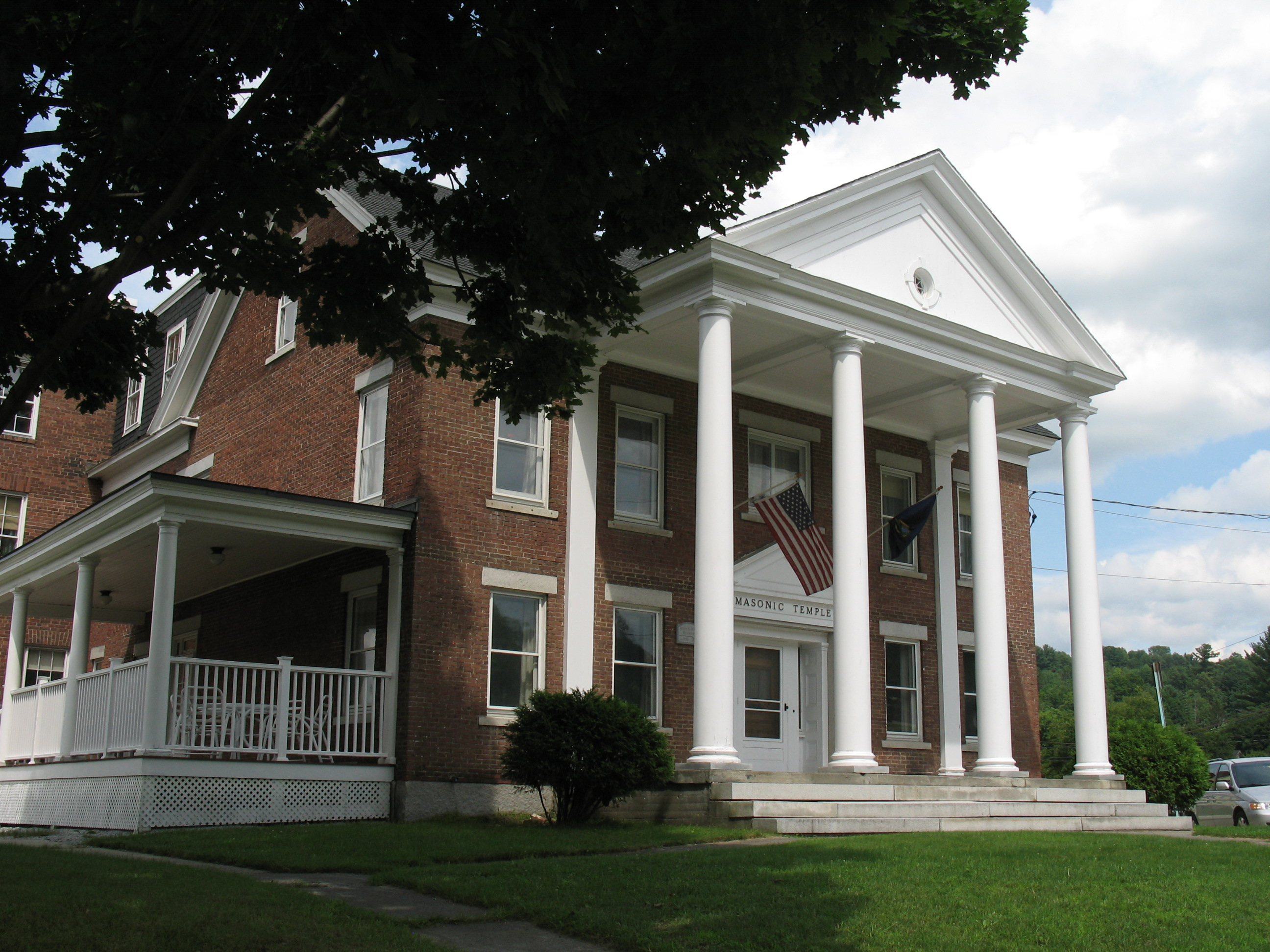
Masonic Temple, 2 Academy Street

== See also ==
- National Register of Historic Places listings in Washington County, Vermont
