= Stoneham Firestation =

- U.S. National Register of Historic Places
- U.S. Historic district – Contributing property
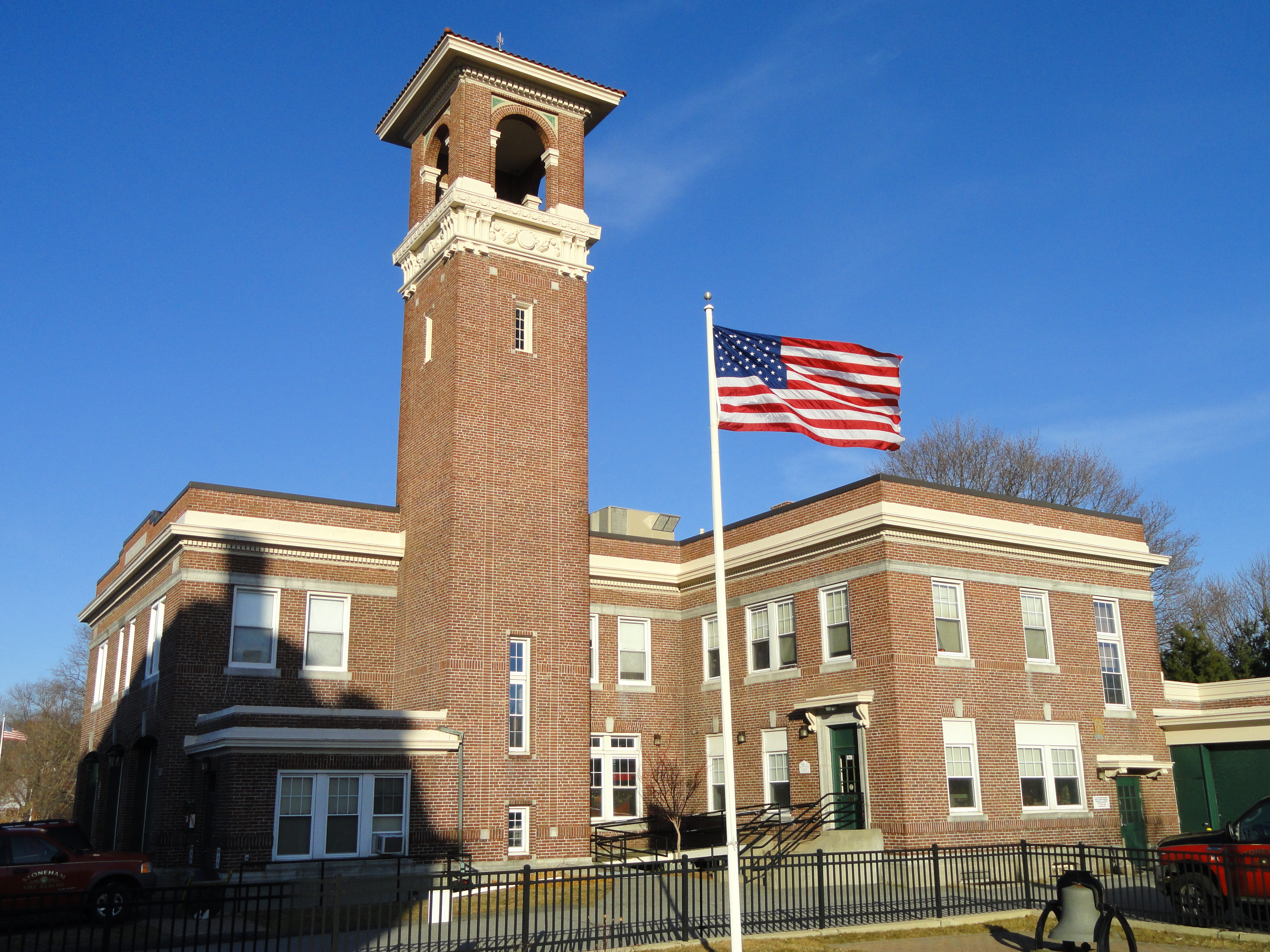
- Stoneham Fire Station

- Location within Massachusetts Location within the United States
- Location: Central and Emerson Sts., Stoneham, Massachusetts
- Coordinates: 42°28′46″N 71°5′59″W
- Built: 1916
- Architect: Penn Varney
- Architectural style: Renaissance
- Part of: Central Square Historic District (ID89002277)
- MPS: Stoneham MRA
- NRHP reference No.: 84002831

Significant dates
- Added to NRHP: April 13, 1984
- Designated CP: January 17, 1990

The Stoneham Firestation is a historic fire station at Central and Emerson Streets in Stoneham, Massachusetts. The two-story red brick Renaissance Revival building was built in 1916, and continues to serve as the town's central fire station. Its most prominent feature is its four-story hose drying tower, which is reminiscent of Italian Renaissance-era towers. The building was listed on the National Register of Historic Places in 1984, and included as a contributing property to the Central Square Historic District in 1990.

== Description and setting ==
The Stoneham Firestation is prominently located adjacent to Central Square at the heart of the town's central business district. It is an L-shaped brick and masonry structure, two stories in height, with a flat roof that is obscured from view by a low parapet. The building is Mediterranean in style, primarily because of the four-story Tuscan tower that towers over it. There are narrow windows in the tower at the third level, above which is an elaborately decorated cornice. The fourth stage is open, with arched openings on each side and square piers at the corners. This is topped by a shallow-pitch tile roof with a dentillated cornice.

The station was built in 1916, and continues to serve as the town's central fire station. It has three equipment bays at the front, with office space in the rear portion of the ell. The tower was a common feature of early 20th-century fire stations, which required space for hoses to dry. This building, designed by Lynn architect Penn Varney, is one of the town's finest Renaissance Revival buildings.

== See also ==
- National Register of Historic Places listings in Stoneham, Massachusetts
- National Register of Historic Places listings in Middlesex County, Massachusetts
