= Melrose Public Library =

- U.S. National Register of Historic Places
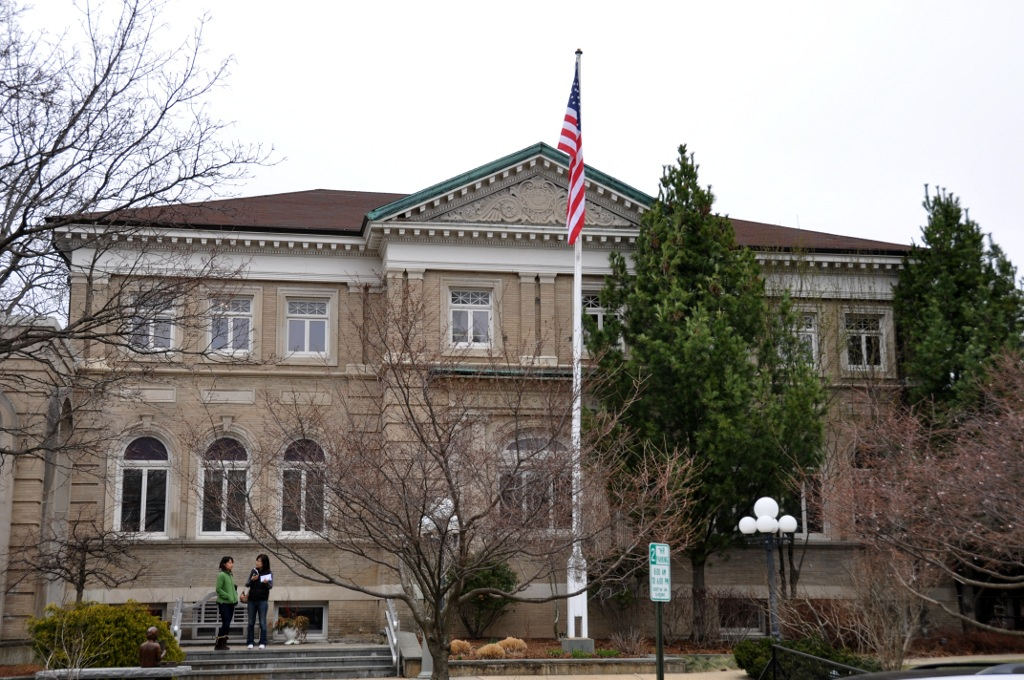

- Location within Massachusetts Location within the United States
- Location: Melrose, Massachusetts
- Coordinates: 42°27′33″N 71°4′2″W
- Built: 1904
- Built by: George M. Tufts
- Architect: Penn Varney
- Architectural style: Classical Revival
- NRHP reference No.: 88000909
- Added to NRHP: June 23, 1988

The Melrose Public Library is a historic library at 69 W. Emerson Street in Melrose, Massachusetts. The original T-shaped building was built in 1904, and is a two-story Colonial Revival structure faced in brick with limestone trim. It was built with funds contributed by philanthropist Andrew Carnegie to a design by Lynn architect Penn Varney, and features stained glass windows by Wilbur H. Burnham. A modern single story addition was added in 1963 to the rear and left side of the building.

The building was listed on the National Register of Historic Places in 1988.

The Library is a member of the North of Boston Library Exchange (NOBLE) consortium.

== Resource collections ==
- General (fiction, nonfiction, reference materials, serials, etc.)
- Children's library
- Teen Zone
- Digital library
- Seed library

== Other services ==
- Computer stations
- Wi-fi
- Printing
- Museum passes
- Room reservations for non-profit, educational, civic, or cultural groups

== See also ==
- National Register of Historic Places listings in Middlesex County, Massachusetts
