= Barre Opera House =

- Barre City Hall and Opera House
- U.S. National Register of Historic Places
- U.S. Historic district – Contributing property
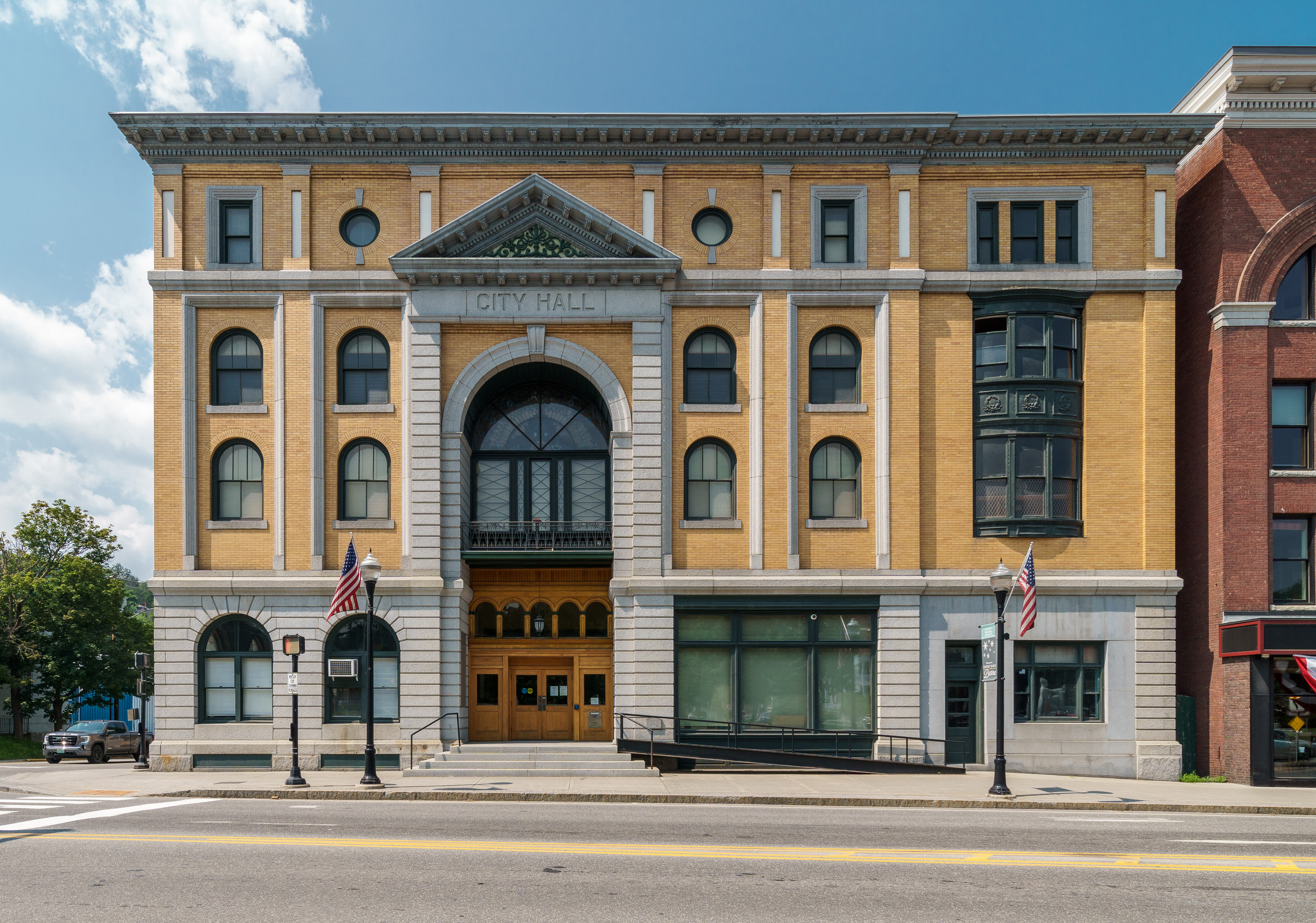

- Location within Vermont Location within the United States
- Location: 6 N. Main St., Barre, Vermont
- Coordinates: 44°11′48″N 72°30′10″W
- Area: less than one acre
- Built: 1899
- Built by: Mason & Company
- Architect: Adams, George G.
- Part of: Barre Downtown Historic District (ID73000198)
- NRHP reference No.: 73000198

Significant dates
- Added to NRHP: January 18, 1973
- Designated CP: September 4, 1979

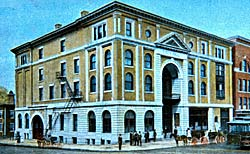
A postcard dating to circa 1900 of the opera house

The Barre Opera House is an opera house in Barre, Vermont, USA. It is located in the Barre City Hall and Opera House, a historic government building at 6 North Main Street in downtown Barre, Vermont. Built in 1899, it houses the city offices; it was built to replace the Barre City Hall/Opera House which burned down in 1898, and its upper floors have served for much of the time since its construction as a performing arts venue. The building was listed on the National Register of Historic Places in 1973.

== History of the building ==
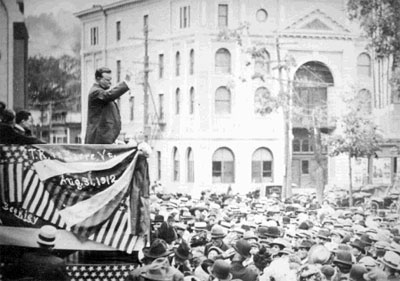
Presidential-hopeful Theodore Roosevelt on the outer balcony of the Barre Opera House on August 31, 1912

The current opera house, designed by George G. Adams, a leading architect of public buildings in New England, was finished on August 23, 1899.

Barre City Hall stands near the eastern end of the city's commercial business district, on the west side of Vermont City Park, a triangular park formed by North Main, Church, and Washington Streets. It is a four-story brick and stone building with Beaux Arts styling. The main feature of its facade is a three-story recessed arch, flanked by pilasters and topped by a gabled pediment. Within this recess, the main entrance is framed by ironwork and topped by a series of arcaded windows. Above these windows a wrought iron arched balcony spans the arch, whose interior is capped by a large half-round fanlight. The interior of the building houses city offices on the ground floor, and the facilities of the opera house on the upper three floors.

The city hall was built in 1899 to a design by George Adams, a native of Lancaster, New Hampshire. Its theater was used until World War I for all manner of performances, meetings, and lectures, and fell into decline with the advent of motion pictures. Although it was modified to show films, the decline continued, and the theater was closed in 1940.

== History of the Barre Opera House ==
=== Beginnings ===
In the decades that followed its opening, the opera house served as a venue for staged plays, speakers, traveling shows, bands, and politicians. People such as Helen Keller, Eugene V. Debs, George M. Cohan, Emma Goldman, John Philip Sousa and Tom Mix graced its stage. In 1912, two presidential candidates made speeches from the outer balcony: William Howard Taft and Theodore Roosevelt.

=== 1930s, 1940s, and Closing ===
During the Great Depression and World War II, the opera house served the community primarily as a movie house. As other, competing movie venues were built in and around Barre, the opera house fell out of favor with the advent of motion pictures and closed its doors in January 1944, remaining vacant for nearly 40 years.

=== Re-opening and Renovation (1982-1993) ===
With significant community support, a dilapidated Barre Opera House re-opened in October 1982. The facility was in an advanced state of disrepair; windows were broken, few seats were left, and the outdated heating system did not function. Community support led to the theater's reopening in 1982, and by the 2000s it had been fully restored with updated amenities. It is one of northern New England's best-preserved theatrical spaces of the turn of the 20th century.

For a decade after its reopening, the opera house underwent a series of incremental upgrades which added curtains, stage lights and a working heating system. In 1993, funds were raised for a massive renovation which added an elevator and balcony seating. The modern seating capacity was raised to 649, bringing it to more than half of the original, 1899-era capacity. The renovations, which have totaled nearly 2 million dollars, are ongoing, with another $400,000 of improvements in the works.

=== The Barre Opera House today ===
More than 20,000 people attend events at the opera house annually.

Many major artists, such as Jackson Browne, John Hiatt, and Shawn Colvin have performed at the BOH in recent years. As an example of the breadth of artists who perform in a given year, the 2013–2014 season has included Nitty Gritty Dirt Band, The Robert Cray Band, Mavis Staples, Lunasa, The Capitol Steps, Le Vent du Nord, Colin Quinn and pianist John O'Connor.

The opera house is renowned for its acoustical purity and it is the central venue of the Vermont Symphony Orchestra.

The Opera House was mentioned in a National Geographic feature on towns in America.: "The proudly blue-collar city supports the arts; rust-peppered pickup trucks jostled newer cars in the overflowing parking lot of the 1899 Barre Opera House for a recent performance of Carmen. But crowds also packed the place for the Miss Vermont pageant last year. You can rent the same stage for your kid's piano recital."

== See also ==
- Barre (city), Vermont
- National Register of Historic Places listings in Washington County, Vermont
