= Maine College of Art & Design =

Private art college in Portland, Maine

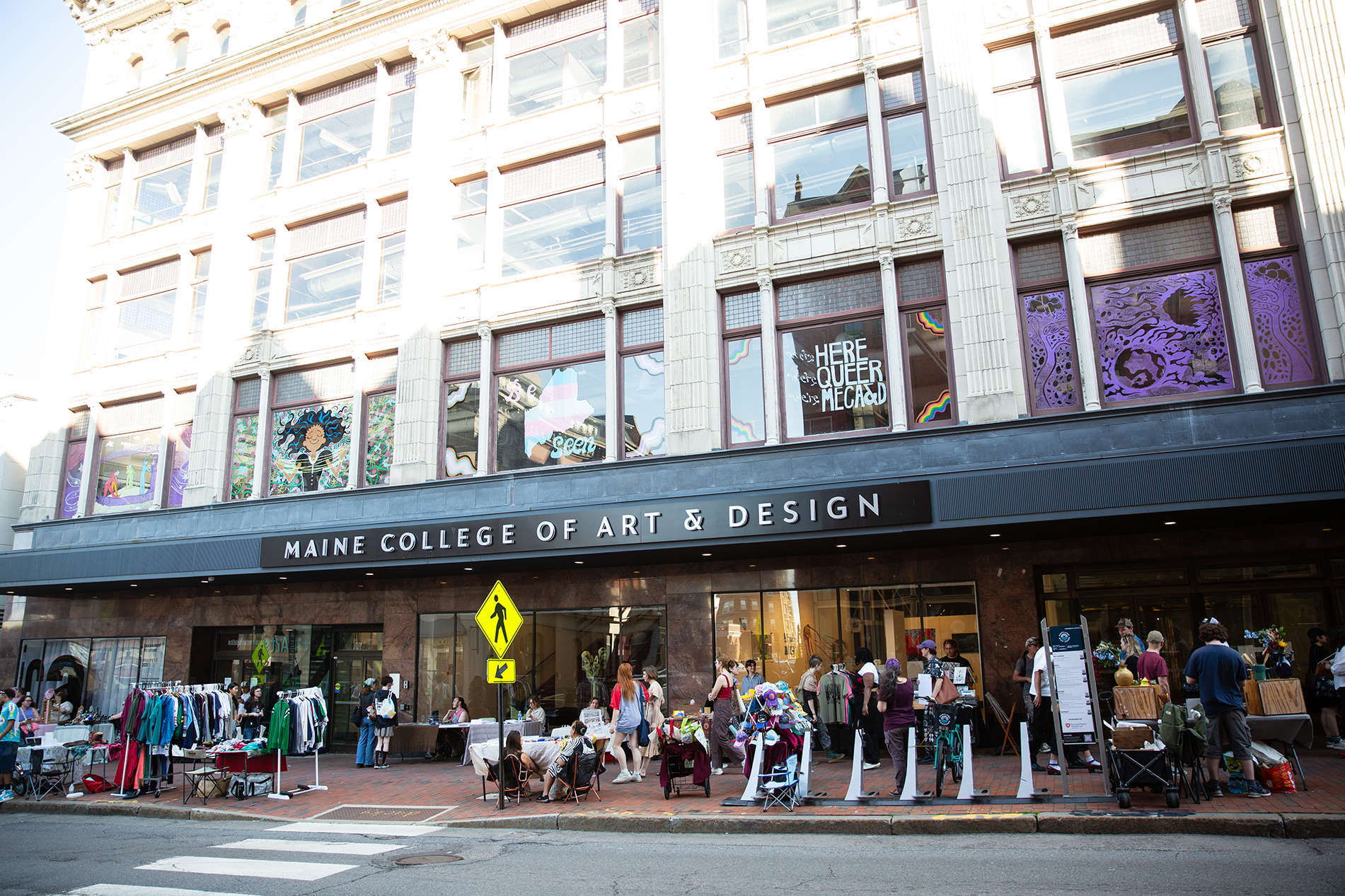
- The Porteous Building, a 1904 beaux arts style building.
- Former names: Maine College of Art; Portland School of Art
- Type: Private art school
- Established: 1882; 144 years ago
- Accreditation: NECHE
- Academic affiliations: AICAD
- Endowment: $15.4 million (2021)
- President: Laura Freid
- Academic staff: 26 Full-time; 65 Part-time
- Administrative staff: 84
- Students: 511
- Undergraduates: 458
- Postgraduates: 53
- Location: 522 Congress Street, Portland, Maine, United States; 43.655670°N 70.260730°W
- Campus: Urban
- Website: meca.edu

Maine College of Art & Design (MECA&D) is a private art school in Portland, Maine. Founded in 1882, Maine College of Art & Design is the oldest arts educational institution in Maine. Roughly 32% of MECA&D students are from Maine. The College is accredited by the New England Commission of Higher Education. In August 2021, the institution formerly named Maine College of Art changed its name to Maine College of Art & Design to reflect the school's emphasis on design.

== Campus ==
Maine College of Art & Design's central academic building resides on Congress Street. This historic building, the Porteous, Mitchell and Braun Company Building, was renovated in the late 1990s to suit the school's needs. With 125,000 square feet (11,600 m^{2}) of space, this former department store is now a six-floor vertical campus. The school also has space in 380 Cumberland on Cumberland Avenue, including drawing studios, academic classrooms, and MFA studios.

Maine College of Art & Design is a member of the Association of Independent Colleges of Art and Design (AICAD), a consortium of thirty-six art schools in the United States.

== Academics ==
Maine College of Art & Design offers a Bachelor of Fine Arts (BFA), a Master of Fine Arts in Studio Art (MFA), a Master of Arts in Teaching (MAT), an Online Master of Arts in Education, an Online Graduate Certificate in Arts Leadership and Administration, an Online Graduate Certificate in Expressive Arts Therapy, a Salt Graduate Certificate in Documentary Studies, as well as Continuing Studies for adults and youths, including a Pre-College intensive for high school students. The BFA program offers eight majors including Animation & Game Art, Ceramics, Graphic Design, Illustration, Painting, Photography, Sculpture, and Textile & Fashion Design. The BFA program also offers seven minors including Art & Entrepreneurship, Art History, Drawing, Music, Public Engagement, Sustainable Ecosystems: Art & Design, and Writing. The Bob Crewe Program in Art and Music enables students to explore the deep relationship between art and music and was made possible by a $3 million bequest from the Bob Crewe Foundation, allowing the College build a music production studio featuring an Avid S6 Mixing Console, music practice rooms and a gallery.

Maine College of College of Art & Design was named to Animation Career Review's list of Top 25 Game Design Bachelor's of Fine Arts (BFA) Degree Programs, Top 25 Game Design Schools and Colleges on the East Coast, Top 25 Graphic Design Schools and Colleges on the East Coast, Top 20 Illustration Schools and Colleges on the East Coast, and Top 25 Animation Schools and Colleges on the East Coast.

The MFA program at Maine College of Art & Design was included in Hyperallergic's list of MFA, MA, and PhD Programs to Apply for by Early 2026.

The College launched online learning in 2025 and in its first cohort, exceeded enrollment projections by over 50%. MECA&D acquired the Salt Institute for Documentary Studies in 2016.

== Annual Events ==
Maine College of Art & Design hosts the Collect Art Sale, an annual fundraiser supporting participating artists and the College's Student Scholarship Fund that has raised over $1 million to date. The sale presents an opportunity for emerging artists to exhibit work alongside established artists. For students who participate, this is often their first chance to show work in a professional setting. Notable past participating artists include Reggie Burrows Hodges, Kathy Bradford, Daniel Minter, Hon. DFA ’19, William Wegman, Linden Frederick, and Jocelyn Lee.

The annual Fashion Show exhibits student work created for the body while raising funds for student scholarships. Students in the Textile & Fashion Design major study fashion design alongside areas of textile expertise, including weaving, knitting, textile printing, and dyeing. All work in the Fashion Show is original student work, designed and crafted by MECA&D students.

MECA&D's annual Holiday Sale provides an opportunity to support the College's community of artists by purchasing handmade arts, crafts, and gifts for the holiday season.

Once a year, the Porteous Building becomes a marketplace selling goods made by Maine College of Art & Design faculty, staff, alumni, and students. Proceeds from the sale go to support both the participating artists and MECA&D students.
