= Skowhegan Historic District =

Historic district in Maine, United States

- U.S. National Register of Historic Places
- U.S. Historic district
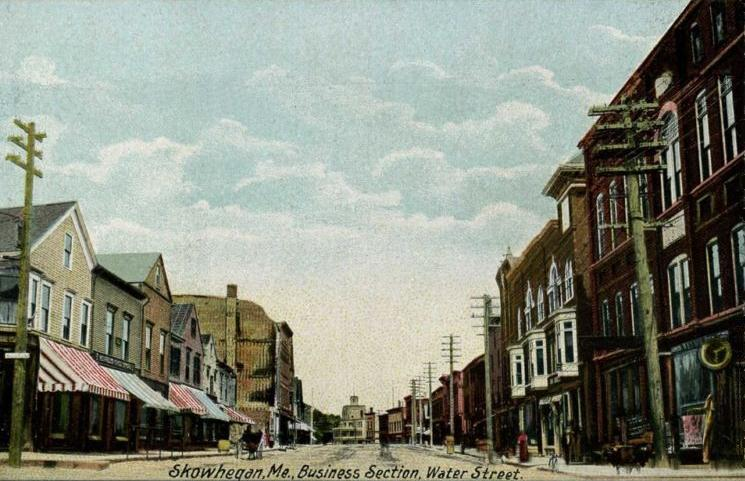
- 1906 postcard view of Water Street

- Location within Maine Location within the United States
- Location: Madison Ave., Water and Commercial Sts., Showhegan, Maine
- Coordinates: 44°45′55″N 69°43′7″W
- Area: 11 acres (4.5 ha)
- Built: 1880
- Architect: Multiple
- Architectural style: Late 19th And 20th Century Revivals, Late Victorian
- NRHP reference No.: 82000781
- Added to NRHP: February 19, 1982

The Skowhegan Historic District encompasses the historic late 19th-century central business district of Skowhegan, Maine. The district is located on Madison Avenue and Water Streets on the north bank of the Kennebec River, and includes 37 historic buildings built between 1850 and 1910, including Skowhegan Town Hall, designed by John Calvin Stevens and built in 1909. The district was listed on the National Register of Historic Places in 1982 (listed erroneously in the town of "Showhegan").

== Description and history ==
The town of Skowhegan, Maine was settled in 1771, incorporated as Canaan in 1788, and changed its name to Skowhegan in 1836, after the falls on the Kennebec River. In 1861 Skowhegan annexed the neighboring town of Bloomfield, which was located on the south side of the river. For many years the town's primary locus of economic activity was in the Bloomfield section on the south side of the river. By the 1840s Water Street, which parallels the river north and east of Skowhegan Island, had become the town's principal center of business. The town was named the shire town of Somerset County in 1872, spurring growth beyond that afforded by the town's successful industries.

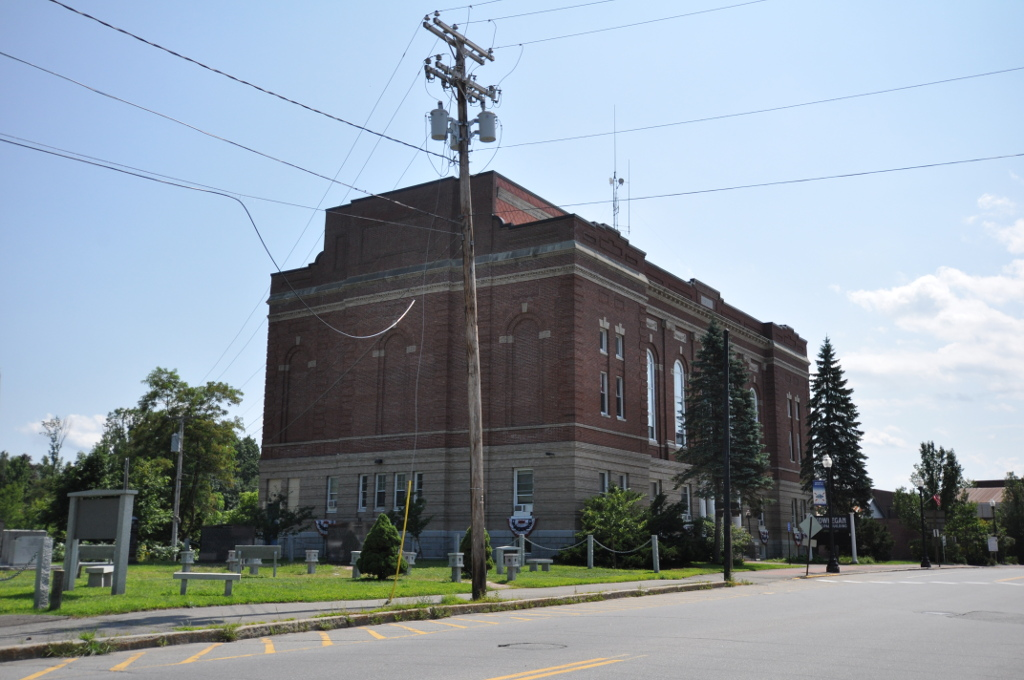
Town hall

The oldest surviving building in the district is the Patten Block, which may date as far back as 1836. This building's interesting history includes an extended period when it was occupied by a restaurant that also operated a speakeasy during the state's many years of Prohibition. The district's buildings are in a diversity of architectural styles, from vernacular commercial structures such as the c. 1895 Fogg Building, a two-story wood frame building, to the Art Deco August Trust Bank building and the Beaux Arts Depositors Trust building, designed by Penn Varney of Lynn, Massachusetts and built in 1909. The district's most architecturally sophisticated building is the Town Hall and Opera House, designed by noted Portland architect John Calvin Stevens. It is a Colonial Revival edifice built in 1909, and is further notable for its association with United States Senator and Skowhegan native Margaret Chase Smith, who was employed by the town in 1916.

== See also ==
- National Register of Historic Places listings in Somerset County, Maine
