= Association of Independent Colleges of Art and Design =

Consortium of art and design schools

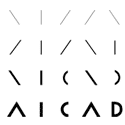
- Abbreviation: AICAD
- Formation: 1991; 35 years ago
- Headquarters: Providence, Rhode Island, U.S.
- Region served: Canada and United States
- Members: 36 (2020)
- Chair: Lorne Buchman
- Website: aicad.org

The Association of Independent Colleges of Art and Design (AICAD) is a non-profit consortium of art and design schools in the United States and Canada. All AICAD member institutions have a curriculum with full liberal arts and sciences requirements complementing studio work, and all are accredited to grant Bachelor of Fine Arts and/or Master of Fine Arts degrees. To qualify for AICAD membership an art school must be: a free-standing college (not a division of a larger college or university) specializing in art or design; a non-profit institution; grant BFA and/or MFA degrees; and have accreditation from both the National Association of Schools of Art and Design (NASAD) and the relevant academic accrediting organization in their region.

AICAD was founded in 1991 by a group of art college presidents for the purpose of sharing information among similar institutions and acting collectively. Its mission is to strengthen and connect the member colleges, and to inform the public about these colleges and the value of studying art and design.

AICAD distributes information about the organization and its members, and about art and design education and careers, to potential students, parents, teachers, and others. It conducts regular conferences and symposia on contemporary academic and administrative subjects, operates an independent studio and internship program in New York City (The New York Studio Residency Program), oversees student exchanges among the member schools, gathers and analyzes institutional data to assist in future planning efforts. It also provides members with information about current art and design education issues as well as information on relevant legislation and government policies.

== Members ==
Members are listed as having programs for undergraduates (ug) and/or graduate students (g)

=== Canada ===
- Alberta University of the Arts (formerly Alberta College of Art and Design) (ug)(g)
- Emily Carr University of Art and Design (ug)(g)
- NSCAD University (ug)(g)
- OCAD University (ug)(g)

=== United States ===
Northeast

- Delaware College of Art and Design (ug)
- College of Art and Design, Lesley University (formerly The Art Institute of Boston) (ug)(g)
- Maine College of Art and Design (formerly Maine College of Art) (ug)(g)
- Maryland Institute College of Art (ug)(g)
- Massachusetts College of Art and Design (ug)(g)
- Montserrat College of Art (ug)
- Moore College of Art and Design (ug)(g)
- New York School of Interior Design (ug)(g)
- Parsons School of Design (ug)
- Pennsylvania Academy of the Fine Arts (ug)(g)
- Pennsylvania College of Art and Design (ug)
- Pratt Institute (ug)(g)
- Rhode Island School of Design (ug)(g)
- School of the Museum of Fine Arts at Tufts (ug)(g)
- School of Visual Arts (ug)(g)

Midwest

- Art Academy of Cincinnati (ug)(g)
- Cleveland Institute of Art (ug)
- College for Creative Studies (ug)(g)
- Columbus College of Art and Design (ug)(g)
- Cranbrook Academy of Art (g)
- Kansas City Art Institute (Missouri) (ug)
- Milwaukee Institute of Art and Design (ug)
- Minneapolis College of Art and Design (ug)(g)
- School of the Art Institute of Chicago (ug)(g)

South

- Ringling College of Art and Design (ug)

West

- Art Center College of Design (ug)(g)
- California College of the Arts (ug)(g) (formerly CCAC)
- California Institute of the Arts (ug)(g)
- Cornish College of the Arts (ug)
- Laguna College of Art and Design (ug)(g)
- Otis College of Art and Design (ug)(g)
- Pacific Northwest College of Art (ug)(g)
- Woodbury University (ug)(g)
