= Aldrich Public Library =

- U.S. National Register of Historic Places
- U.S. Historic district – Contributing property
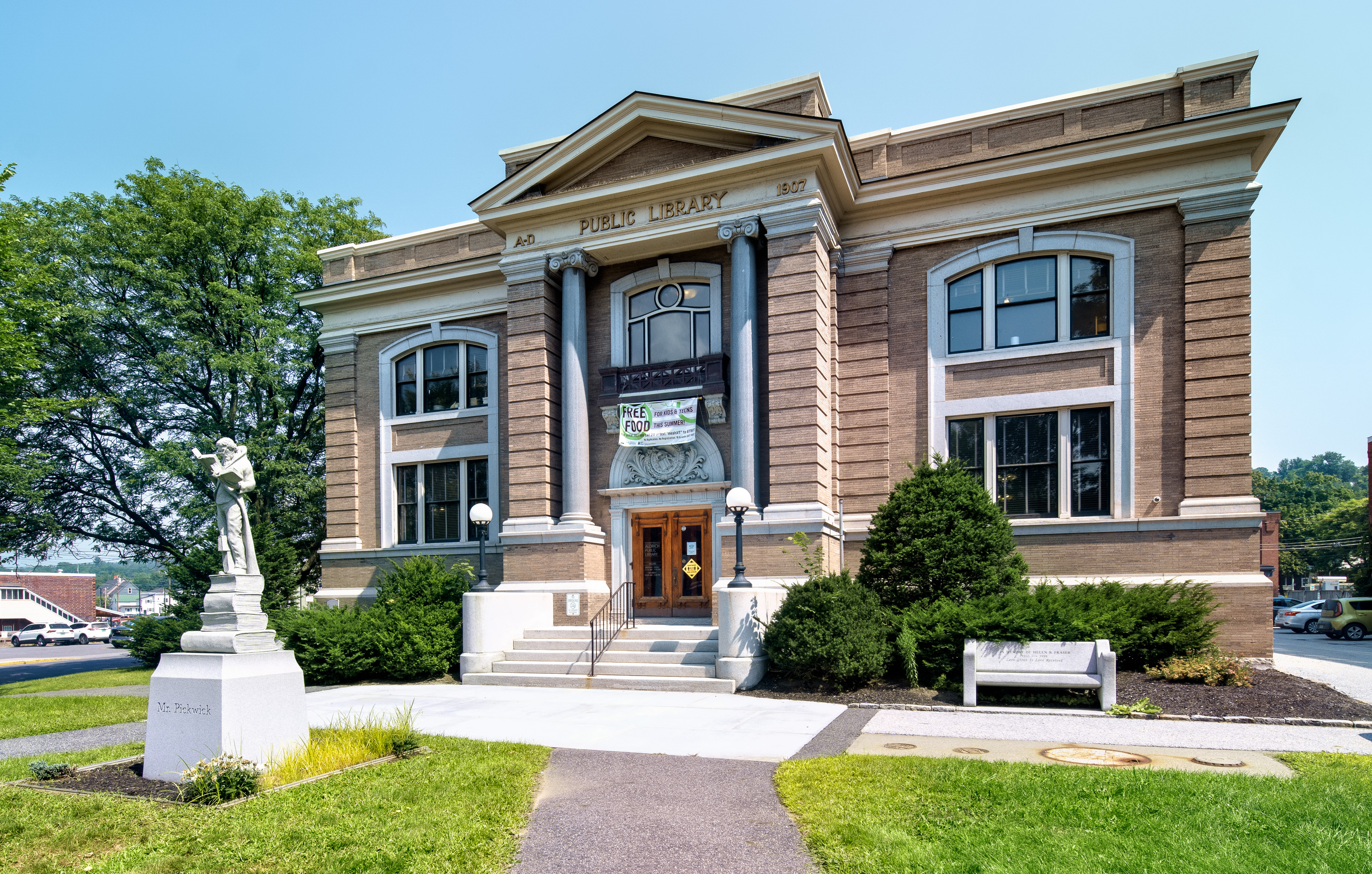

- Location within Vermont Location within the United States
- Location: 6 Washington St., Barre, Vermont
- Coordinates: 44°11′51″N 72°30′4″W
- Area: less than one acre
- Built: 1907
- Architect: Penn Varney
- Architectural style: Classical Revival
- Part of: Barre Downtown Historic District (ID73000198)
- NRHP reference No.: 15000961

Significant dates
- Added to NRHP: January 5, 2015
- Designated CP: September 4, 1979

The Aldrich Public Library is the public library serving the city of Barre, Vermont. It is located at 6 Washington Street in the city center, in an architecturally distinguished Classical Revival building constructed in 1907–08 with funds bequested by Leonard Frost Aldrich, a local businessman, and was substantially enlarged in 2000. The building was listed on the National Register of Historic Places in 2016.

== Architecture and history ==
Interior

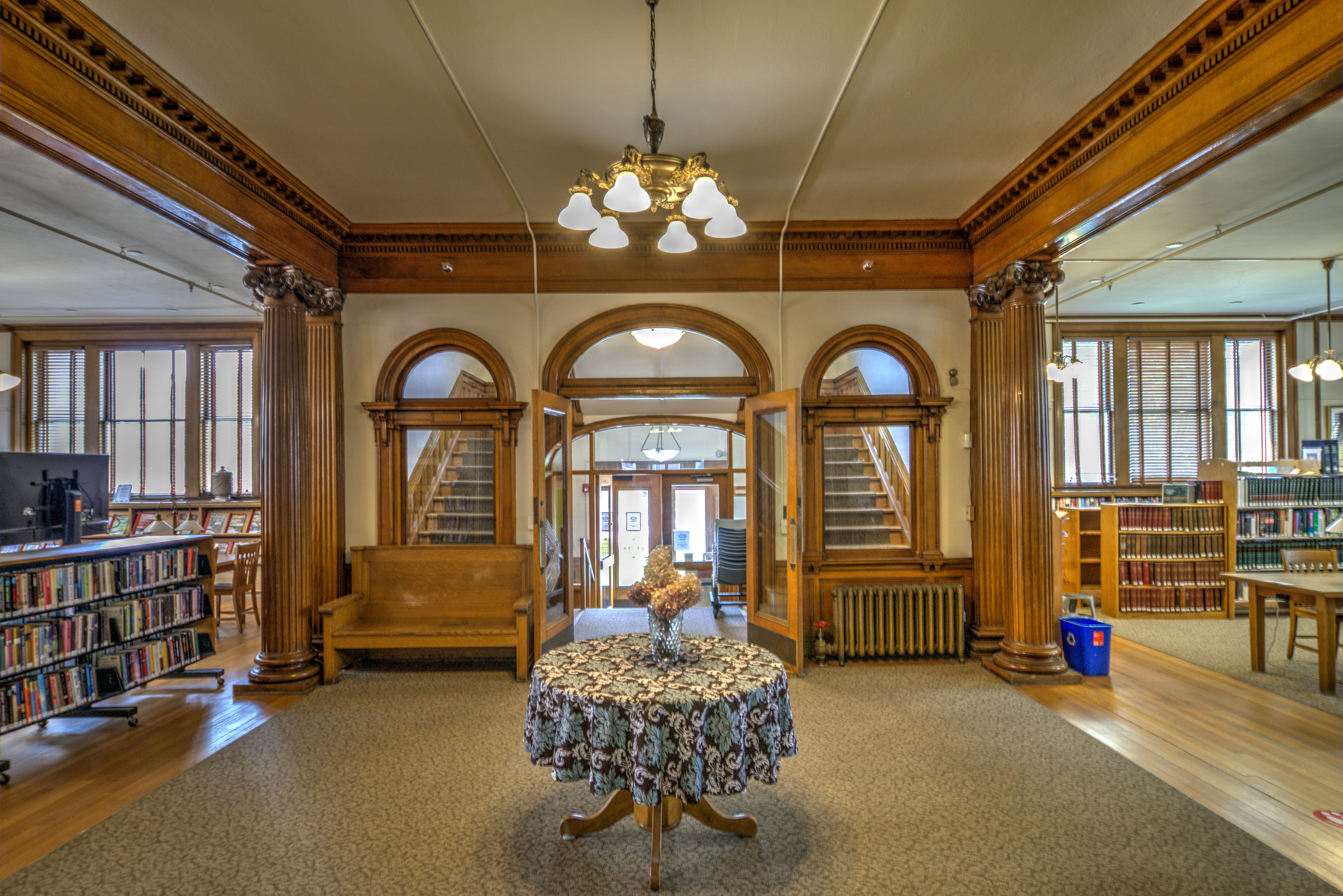
Interior

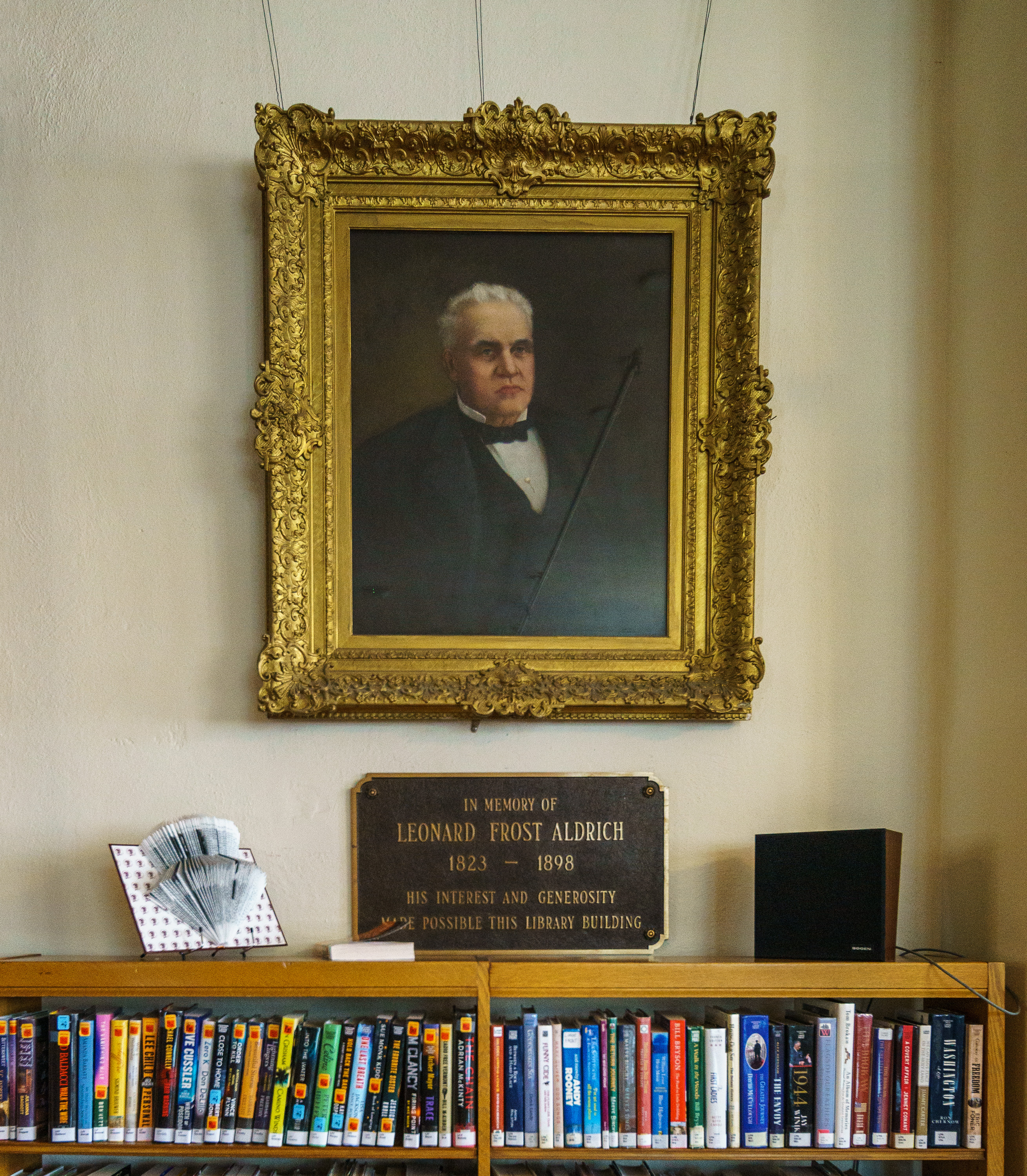
Memorial to Leonard Frost Aldrich

The Aldrich Public Library is a prominent feature of downtown Barre, at the northeast corner of Washington and Elm Streets, across Washington Street from Vermont City Park. It is set back from the intersection, accessed via paved walkways traversing a lawn. It is a two-story building, with a steel frame and brick veneer exterior trimmed in local granite. The front facade is three bays wide, the center one projecting. Banded brick pilasters with Doric capitals articulate each of the bays. The outer bays have three-part windows on each level, set in a shared keystoned granite surround. The main entrance is recessed in the center section, with flanking Ionic columns. It is topped by a decorative granite frieze, and there is a balconied three-part window above. The stairway leading to the entrance is framed by granite sidewalls topped by original Beaux-Arts iron globe light fixtures.

The oldest documented library in Barre was a small subscription library established in 1848. In 1873, the Barre Library Association was organized, as a formal subscription library stored in local businesses and homes. A second subscription library, the French Barre Library, was founded in 1887. These two collections were merged when the Aldrich Library was built in 1907–08. The Aldrich Library was made possible by a bequest from Leonard Frost Aldrich, a local businessman who had died without issue. His bequest included funding for construction of the building and the acquisition of books for its collection. The city council originally sought to have a building completely faced in local granite (the city's primary business), but this was found to be cost prohibitive, and a compromise construction of brick trimmed in local granite was developed by the architect, Penn Varney of Lynn, Massachusetts.

== See also ==
- National Register of Historic Places listings in Washington County, Vermont
