= Foster Building =

- U.S. National Register of Historic Places
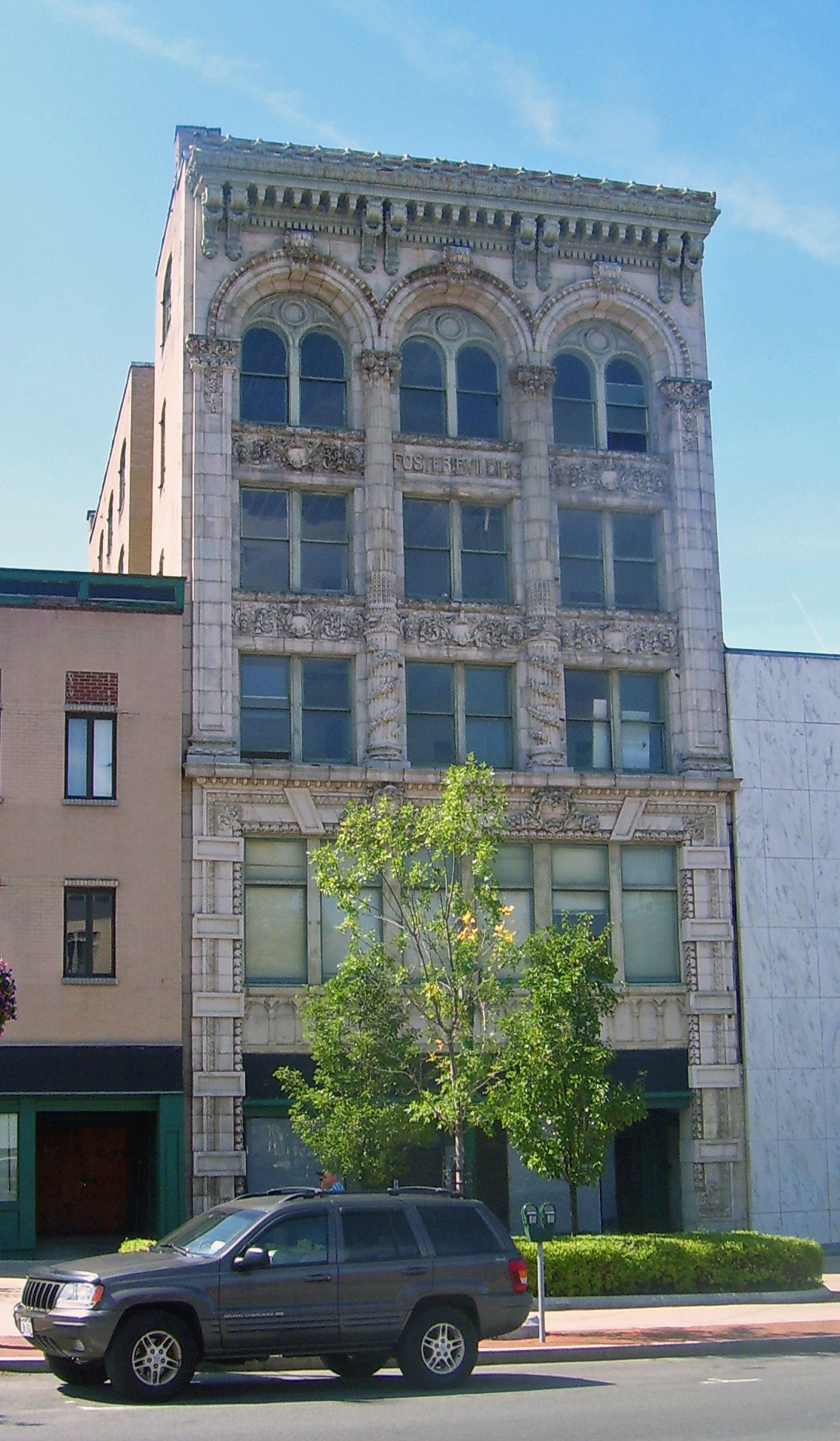
- North elevation, 2008
- Location: Schenectady, NY
- Coordinates: 42°48′41″N 73°56′25″W
- Area: less than one acre
- Built: 1907
- Architect: Penn Varney
- Architectural style: Beaux-Arts
- NRHP reference No.: 91000664
- Added to NRHP: June 3, 1991

The Foster Building, originally the Hotel Foster, is located on State Street (NY 5) in Schenectady, New York, United States. It is a commercial building in the Beaux-Arts architectural style.

When built in 1907, it was the first building in the city to use terra cotta as its primary siding on the front facade, and the first built under the precepts of the City Beautiful movement. In 1991 it was listed on the National Register of Historic Places. It has since been remodeled into apartments, but has been vacant for a while and is suffering from the neglect. Past water damage will require that the lavishly appointed interior be completely gutted. The regional redevelopment agency is considering acquiring the building through eminent domain in order to ensure its restoration.

== Building ==
The Foster Building is one of a row of commercial buildings in the densely developed blocks of State Street, a short distance from Proctor's Theatre. It is a six-story steel frame building, higher than most of its neighbors, faced in white glazed terra cotta. A small tree surrounded by an island of shrubbery is located on the sidewalk in front.

=== Exterior ===
The terra cotta in the northern (front) facade is highly decorated. On the first two stories the storefront is framed with acanthus leaves and garlands with mock keystones and rectangular blocks. The windows are brass-framed glass with the two-story storefront as a whole framed in marble.

Above the storefronts, the upper facade in three bays is articulated by three-story high engaged pilasters with highly enriched Corinthian capitals. Fluted Ionic half-columns divide the window bays. All four support pedimented Roman arches. Oversized brackets support the metal cornice.

Decorative panels are placed between all three upper stories. In the divided central bays of the panels below the fifth story is the modeled and cast inscription "FOSTER BVILDING".

The other facades are faced in exposed yellow brick. Most of the windows have their original shutters. The flat roof is surfaced in asphalt. It has a brick parapet with metal coping; the chimney has stone copings.

=== Interior ===
The first floor has steel columns and a metal ceiling 14 feet (4.3 m) high. The entrance to the upper floors is tiled mosaic with the letters "FB" and a geometric border. At the entryway, black and white marble wainscoting is on the plaster walls, which rise to a coffered ceiling. The staircase itself has marble facing, with pink marble wainscoting on the sides. All these details are original.

At the second floor landing, a wooden doorway with semi-elliptical arched transom leads to the floor itself. It is finished in classically inspired carved trim, embossed wood wainscoting and pressed glass dividers. An oak staircase lit by a brass-framed skylight provides access to the upper floors, many of which have been converted to apartment space by combining several former hotel rooms. The sixth floor, originally used as storage space and staff quarters, has been similarly transformed. Original finishes here include plaster walls, wooden flooring, wide moldings with corner blocks and transom lights on the paneled doors.

== Aesthetics ==
The Foster Building's height is unusual for Schenectady's downtown. Its terra cotta facade is unique in the city. Most of Schenectady's commercial buildings date to the mid- or late 19th century and are faced in brick, rarely more than three stories tall.

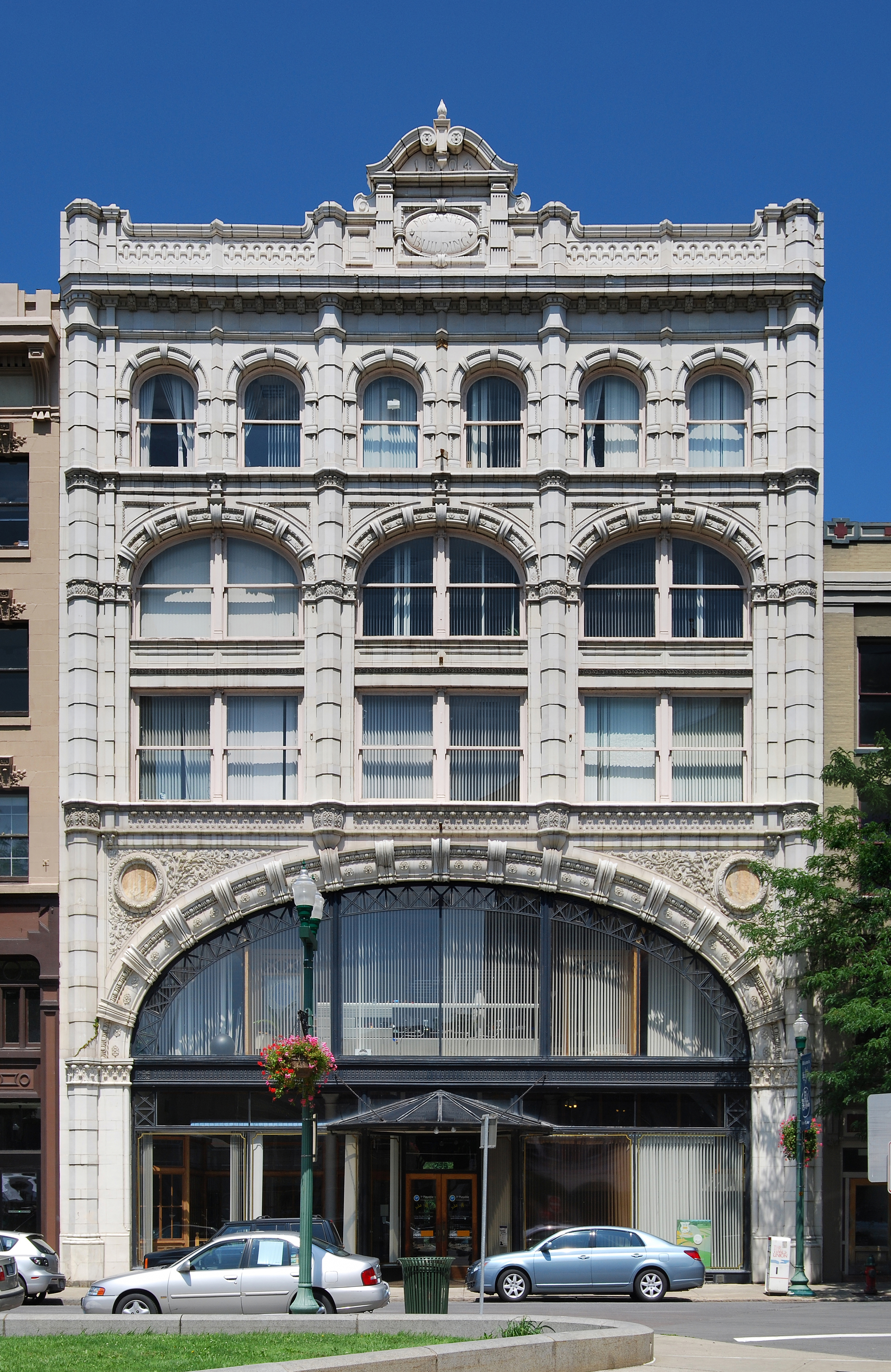
McCarthy Building in Troy

Throughout most of the 19th century, architectural terracotta had been confined to decorative touches like windowsills and lintels. The Great Chicago Fire of 1871 stirred some interest by demonstrating that terracotta facing was fireproof. In the 1890s it started to be used as a siding since it was cheaper than stone and had far more decorative possibilities. The Foster Building's level of detail is exceptional. Elsewhere in the Capital District, only the McCarthy Building in downtown Troy shows the same craftmanship in terra cotta.

Its use was promoted by the Beaux-Arts movement in architecture, which made generous use of classically inspired ornamentation. The style and material came together in the City Beautiful movement in urban design. An outgrowth of the Columbian Exposition of 1893, which had first popularized the Beaux-Arts and Classical Revival architectural styles, City Beautiful advocated cities with decorated buildings in white or bright colors, in imitation of Ancient Rome. They expected this would encourage residents to behave in an orderly and decorous manner worthy of the surroundings. Their influence was felt most in centers of newly created industrial wealth like Schenectady, although the Foster Building was the only one built in the city according to City Beautiful principles.

== History ==
As Schenectady grew rapidly following General Electric's decision to locate its research laboratory in the city, where it already had a substantial presence, living space was at a premium. Local entrepreneur Charles Brown, who had built the Edison Hotel in 1900, saw it reach capacity quickly. He hired architect Penn Varney of Lynn, Massachusetts, to design another hotel in 1907. A local contractor, Hanrahan Brothers, built it that same year for $50,000 ($1.73 million in contemporary dollars).

The hotel remained in the Brown family through 1963. It continued to be used for both commercial and residential purposes afterwards, with a music store a longtime street-level tenant through the mid-1970s.

Later occupants were not as successful in either endeavor, and the building became vacant. A 1990s owner left the heat turned off one winter, resulting in a burst pipe that caused severe damage to the structure, estimated to cost $4–5 million to repair. In the 2000s, the owner tried to sell the property as the Schenectady Metroplex Development Authority (SMDA), which had already sought state grants to restore the facade, threatened to acquire the building through eminent domain if necessary. The SMDA plans to redevelop the Foster and three neighboring buildings, also vacant, into a 47,000-square-foot (4,400 m^{2}) luxury hotel.

== See also ==
- National Register of Historic Places listings in Schenectady County, New York
