= New York State Route 406 =

State highway in Schenectady County, New York, US

New York State Route 406
- Giffords Church Road
- Map of Schenectady County in eastern New York with NY 406 highlighted in red

Route information
- Maintained by NYSDOT
- Length: 3.60 mi (5.79 km)
- Existed: mid-1930s–present

Major junctions
- West end: US 20 in Princetown
- East end: NY 158 in Rotterdam

Location
- Country: United States
- State: New York
- Counties: Schenectady

Highway system
- New York Highways; Interstate; US; State; Reference; Parkways
← NY 405	→ NY 407

New York State Route 406 (NY 406) is a state highway in Schenectady County, New York, in the United States. The western terminus of the route is at an intersection with U.S. Route 20 (US 20) in the town of Princetown. Its eastern terminus is at a junction with NY 158 in the town of Rotterdam. NY 406 is a two-lane highway and known as Giffords Church Road along its entire length. It was assigned to its current alignment in the mid-1930s.

== Route description ==
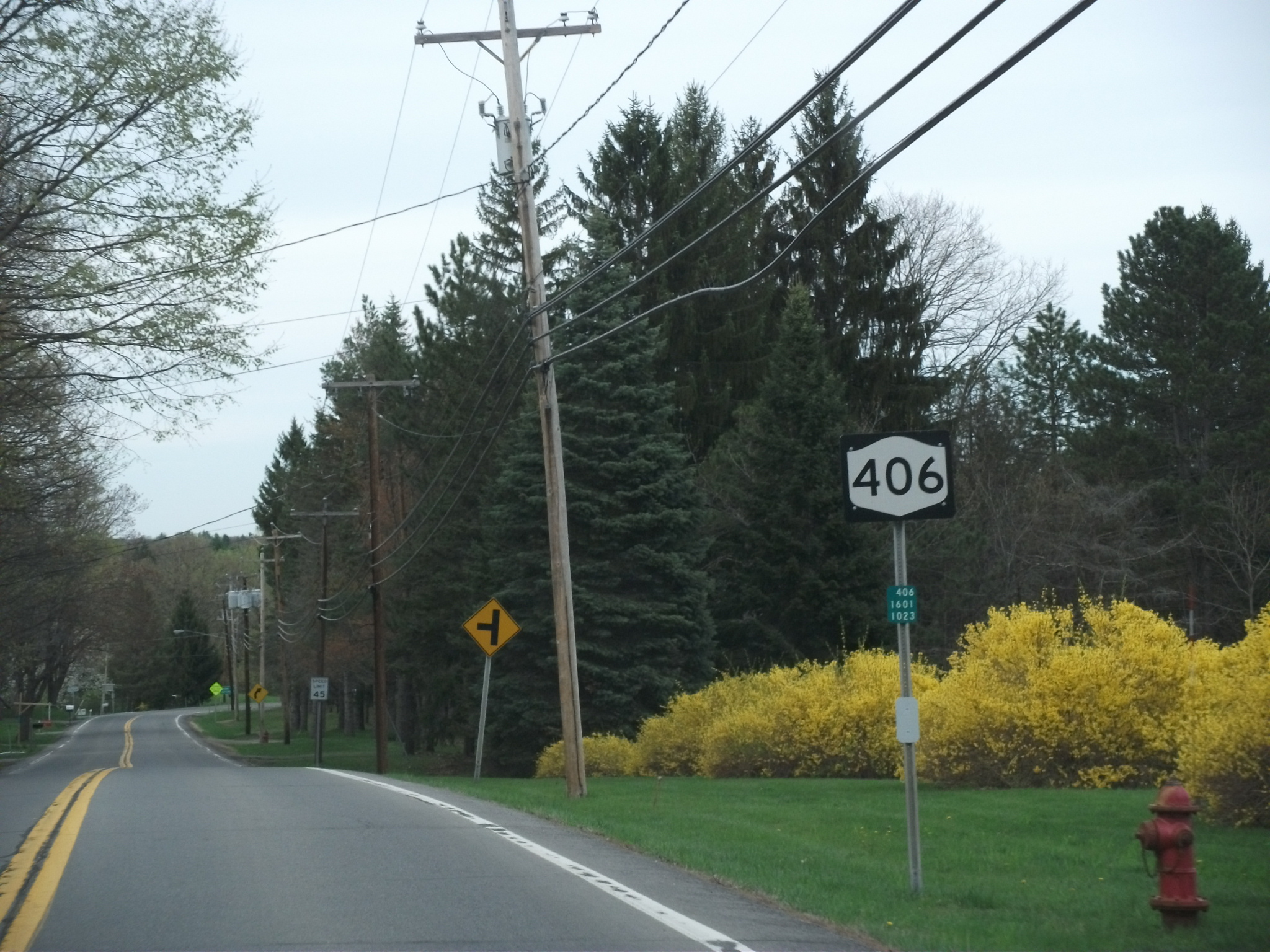
NY 406 heading through Rotterdam

NY 406 begins at an intersection with US 20 (Western Turnpike) in the Princetown hamlet of Gifford. The route progresses eastbound past the Hillcrest Golf Club as Giffords Church Road, paralleling US 20 to the north until an intersection with Parkers Corners Road (County Route 60 or CR 60). There it turns northeast, intersecting with Windy Hill Road (CR 99), a north–south road leading to CR 60. NY 406 continues northeastward through farmlands, intersecting with Quackenbush Road (CR 62) on its way into the town of Rotterdam, where the route passes to the south of Schenectady Memorial Park in the hamlet of Pine Grove. The route ends just east of the park at a junction with NY 158 (Guilderland Avenue).

== History ==
The origins of NY 406 date back to January 3, 1922, when the Schenectady County Board of Supervisors passed a resolution expressing the county's desire to have the state of New York reconstruct the road as a state highway. At the same time, the board withdrew the county's support for a state project to rebuild part of what is now NY 147 in order to offset the mileage gained by adding Giffords Church Road to the state highway system. The changes required the approval of the New York State Department of Highways, which rejected the proposal by January 11. Despite this fact, Giffords Church Road was taken over by the state of New York by 1926 and designated NY 406 at some point between 1933 and 1936.

== Major intersections ==
The entire route is in Schenectady County.

Location	mi	km	Destinations	Notes
Princetown	0.00	0.00	US 20 (Western Turnpike) – Albany, Duanesburg	Western terminus; hamlet of Gifford
Town of Rotterdam	3.60	5.79	NY 158 (Guilderland Avenue) – Schenectady, Altamont	Eastern terminus; hamlet of Pine Grove
1.000 mi = 1.609 km; 1.000 km = 0.621 mi
