= List of county routes in Schenectady County, New York =

County routes in Schenectady County, New York, are not signed with route markers; however, they are frequently posted on street blade signs.

== Routes 1–100 ==
Route	Length (mi)	Length (km)	From	Via	To	Notes
CR 1	0.22	0.35	Albany County line	Old River Road in Niskayuna	CR 158	
CR 2	0.36	0.58	NY 7	Niskayuna Road in Niskayuna	CR 158	
CR 3	0.88	1.42	Albany County line	Lisha Kill Road in Niskayuna	NY 7	
CR 4	0.22	0.35	Albany County line	Ferris Road in Niskayuna	CR 9	
CR 5	0.69	1.11	NY 7	Mohawk Road in Niskayuna	CR 158	
CR 6	0.54	0.87	Schenectady city line	Nott Street in Niskayuna	NY 146	
CR 7	1.24	2.00	Albany County line	Pearse Road in Niskayuna	NY 7	
CR 8	0.72	1.16	Schenectady city line	Providence Road in Niskayuna	NY 146 / CR 19	
CR 9	1.63	2.62	Albany County line	Consaul Road in Niskayuna	Schenectady city line	
CR 10	1.65	2.66	Schenectady city line	Aqueduct Road in Niskayuna	NY 146	
CR 11	1.74	2.80	CR 9	Saint Davids Lane in Niskayuna	NY 7 / Union Avenue (NY 911G)	
CR 12	0.75	1.21	NY 50	Sunnyside Road in Glenville	Freeman Bridge Road (NY 911F)	
CR 13	0.70	1.13	NY 5	Taurus Road in Niskayuna	CR 9	
CR 14	0.09	0.14	CR 29	Ronald Reagan Way in Glenville	Stratton Air National Guard Base	
CR 15	0.63	1.01	Albany County line	Albany Street in Niskayuna	Schenectady city line	
CR 16	0.74	1.19	CR 29	Alplaus Avenue in Glenville	Saratoga County line (becomes CR 88)	
CR 17	0.20	0.32	CR 1	Tech Park Road in Glenville	Dead end	
CR 18	0.18	0.29	NY 50	Rudy Chase Drive in Glenville	Dead end at Schenectady County Airport	
CR 19	3.26	5.25	CR 158	River Road in Niskayuna	NY 146 / CR 8	
CR 20	0.95	1.53	NY 50	Pashley Road in Glenville	CR 31	
CR 21	2.03	3.27	Schenectady city line	Van Antwerp Road in Niskayuna	CR 19	
CR 22	0.36	0.58	NY 50	Gleason Road in Glenville	CR 37	
CR 23	0.50	0.80	CR 21	Grand Blvd in Niskayuna	Schenectady city line	
CR 24	0.94	1.51	Saratoga County line (becomes CR 53)	Lake Hill Road in Glenville	Saratoga County line (becomes CR 58)	
CR 25	1.40	2.25	Schenectady city line	Dean Street in Niskayuna	CR 8	
CR 26	0.31	0.50	NY 50 / Freemans Bridge Road (NY 911F)	Worden Road in Glenville	CR 43	
CR 28	0.83	1.34	CR 43	Van Buren Road in Glenville	NY 50 / Glenridge Road (NY 914V)	
CR 29	3.02	4.86	Freemans Bridge Road (NY 911F)	Maple Avenue in Glenville	CR 31	
CR 30	2.40	3.86	NY 5 / NY 890	Vley Road in Glenville	NY 50	
CR 31	2.45	3.94	Glenridge Road (NY 914V)	Hetcheltown Road in Glenville	NY 50	
CR 32	1.30	2.09	NY 147	Snake Hill Road in Glenville	CR 47	
CR 33	0.91	1.46	NY 50	High Mills Road in Glenville	Saratoga County line (becomes CR 56)	
CR 34	1.08	1.74	NY 147	Bolt Road in Glenville	CR 43	
CR 35	0.58	0.93	NY 50 / Freemans Bridge Road (NY 911F)	Airport Road in Glenville	NY 50	
CR 36	1.02	1.64	CR 38 / CR 49	Church Road in Glenville	NY 147	
CR 37	1.58	2.54	NY 50	Charlton Road in Glenville	Saratoga County line (becomes CR 54)	
CR 38	1.21	1.95	CR 51	Sanders Road in Glenville	CR 36 / CR 49	
CR 39	1.07	1.72	CR 37	Van Vorst Road in Glenville	CR 24	
CR 40	4.14	6.66	CR 63 at Montgomery County line (becomes CR 1)	West Glenville Road in Glenville	NY 147	
CR 41	1.54	2.48	CR 43	Droms Road in Glenville	CR 37	
CR 42	2.12	3.41	CR 61 / CR 63	Potter Road in Glenville	CR 55	
CR 43	4.29	6.90	NY 50	Swaggertown Road in Glenville	Saratoga County line (becomes CR 52)	
CR 44	0.18	0.29	Montgomery County line	Fairbanks Road in Glenville	CR 63	
CR 45	1.11	1.79	CR 43	Baldwin Road in Glenville	CR 47	
CR 46	0.26	0.42	Montgomery County line	Bronk Road in Glenville	CR 63	
CR 47	2.64	4.25	NY 147	Spring Road in Glenville	CR 43	
CR 48	0.97	1.56	CR 67	Highbridge Road in Rotterdam	CR 65	
CR 49	5.29	8.51	NY 147	Ridge Road in Glenville	CR 40	
CR 51	3.41	5.49	NY 5	Washout Road in Glenville	CR 49	
CR 52	3.66	5.89	CR 86 / CR 109 in Princetown	Currybush Road	NY 159 in Rotterdam	
CR 53	3.51	5.65	NY 5	Johnson Road in Glenville	CR 40	
CR 54	4.59	7.39	NY 159 / CR 97	Putnam Road in Rotterdam	NY 337	
CR 55	1.93	3.11	CR 40	North Road in Glenville	NY 147	
CR 56	2.77	4.46	NY 159	Gordon Road in Rotterdam	CR 54 / CR 93	
CR 58	2.75	4.43	CR 97	Crawford and Old Crawford roads in Rotterdam	NY 5S	
CR 59	2.14	3.44	NY 5	Wolf Hollow Road in Glenville	CR 40 / CR 61	
CR 60	0.40	0.64	NY 406	Parkers Corners Road in Princetown	Albany County line	
CR 61	1.45	2.33	CR 42 / CR 63	Green Corners Road in Glenville	CR 40 / CR 59	
CR 62	1.38	2.22	CR 103	Quackenbush Road in Princetown	NY 406	
CR 63	3.02	4.86	CR 40	Touareuna Road in Glenville	Saratoga County line	
CR 64	1.72	2.77	US 20	Suits Road in Duanesburg	CR 76 / CR 110	
CR 65	0.49	0.79	Albany County line	Kings Road in Rotterdam	Schenectady city line	
CR 66	0.40	0.64	NY 7	Birchwood Drive in Princetown	Dead end at I-88	
CR 66	0.70	1.13	Dead end at I-88	Birchwood Drive in Princetown	CR 103 / CR 108	
CR 67	0.43	0.69	NY 146	East Campbell Road in Rotterdam	CR 48	
CR 68	2.47	3.98	CR 70 in Princetown	Maben Road	CR 105 in Princetown	
CR 69	0.50	0.80	Schenectady city line	Chrisler Avenue in Rotterdam	NY 915D at Towers Street	
CR 70	6.64	10.69	CR 127 in Duanesburg	Scotch Ridge Road	CR 52 in Rotterdam	
CR 71	0.91	1.46	NY 7	Fort Hunter Road in Rotterdam	NY 146	
CR 72	1.20	1.93	NY 160	Muselbeck Road in Princetown	CR 97	
CR 73	0.21	0.34	Altamont Avenue (NY 911H)	Crane Street Extension in Rotterdam	Schenectady city line	
CR 74	6.14	9.88	NY 7 / NY 395 / CR 90 / CR 133	Schoharie Turnpike in Duanesburg	US 20 / CR 76	
CR 75	2.28	3.67	Albany County line	Helderberg Avenue in Rotterdam	Schenectady city line	
CR 75A	0.28	0.45	CR 75	Old Helderberg Avenue in Rotterdam	Dead end at New York State Thruway	
CR 76	0.63	1.01	US 20 / CR 74	Mott Road in Duanesburg	CR 64	
CR 77	0.75	1.21	NY 406	South Westcott Road in Rotterdam	Dead end at New York State Thruway	
CR 78	1.12	1.80	CR 135	Salsburg Road in Duanesburg	CR 133	
CR 79	0.57	0.92	Rensen Street	North Westcott Road in Rotterdam	CR 161	
CR 80	0.62	1.00	NY 7 / CR 131 in Duanesburg	East Shore Road	NY 395 in Delanson	
CR 81	1.93	3.11	NY 406	Dunnsville Road in Rotterdam	NY 7	
CR 82	2.81	4.52	CR 153	Thousand Acre Road in Duanesburg	Delanson village line	
CR 83	1.94	3.12	NY 7 / NY 159 / CR 161	Princetown Road in Rotterdam	CR 54	
CR 84	1.39	2.24	NY 395	Cole Road in Delanson	NY 7	
CR 85	0.47	0.76	NY 7	Keller Avenue in Rotterdam	NY 159	
CR 86	7.42	11.94	CR 143 in Duanesburg	Skyline Drive	CR 52 / CR 109 in Princetown	
CR 87	0.68	1.09	NY 159	North Thompson Road in Rotterdam	NY 337	
CR 88	3.71	5.97	CR 127	Lake Road in Duanesburg	NY 159	
CR 89	0.50	0.80	Schenectady city line	West Campbell Road in Rotterdam	NY 337	
CR 90	0.68	1.09	NY 7 / NY 395 / CR 74 / CR 133	Quaker Lane in Duanesburg	Dead end at I-88	
CR 91	0.91	1.46	NY 914B	Old Rice Road in Rotterdam	Dead end at Erie Canal Lock 8	Formerly part of NY 5S
CR 92	0.31	0.50	NY 159	Spring Road in Duanesburg	Princetown town line	
CR 93	1.13	1.82	Dead end at NY 337	Schermerhorn Road in Rotterdam	CR 91	
CR 94	2.75	4.43	CR 127	Batter Street in Duanesburg	NY 159	
CR 95	0.83	1.34	CR 52 in Princetown	Currybush Connection	CR 54 in Rotterdam	
CR 96	0.67	1.08	NY 160	Dennison Road in Duanesburg	CR 113 / CR 117	
CR 97	5.25	8.45	NY 159 / CR 54 in Princetown	Pattersonville–Rynex Corners Road	NY 5S in Rotterdam	
CR 99	0.25	0.40	Albany County line	Windy Hill Road in Princetown	NY 406	
CR 100	1.79	2.88	NY 30	Hardin Road in Duanesburg	CR 127	

== Routes 101 and up ==
Route	Length (mi)	Length (km)	From	Via	To	Notes
CR 101	0.27	0.43	US 20	Settles Hill Road in Princetown	Albany County line	
CR 102	1.98	3.19	Montgomery County line (becomes CR 160)	Braman Corners Road in Duanesburg	NY 30 / CR 135	
CR 103	3.36	5.41	NY 406 in Princetown	Pangburn Road	CR 70 in Rotterdam	
CR 105	1.05	1.69	CR 70	Kelley Station Road in Princetown	NY 7	
CR 106	2.43	3.91	Schoharie County line (becomes CR 46)	Creek Road in Duanesburg	US 20	
CR 107	1.46	2.35	CR 86	South Kelly Road in Princetown	CR 70	
CR 108	0.22	0.35	NY 7 / CR 103	Old Pangburn Road in Princetown	CR 66 / CR 103	
CR 109	0.88	1.42	CR 52 / CR 86	North Kelley Road in Princetown	NY 159 / CR 111	
CR 110	2.07	3.33	CR 64 / CR 76 in Duanesburg	Darrow Road	CR 103 in Princetown	
CR 111	2.54	4.09	NY 159 / CR 109 in Duanesburg	Weast Road	NY 159 in Princetown	
CR 113	2.11	3.40	CR 96 / CR 117 in Duanesburg	Reynolds Road	CR 111 in Princetown	
CR 115	3.25	5.23	CR 117	Ennis Road in Princetown	CR 97	
CR 117	1.89	3.04	CR 96 / CR 113 in Duanesburg	Sterling Road	NY 160 in Princetown	
CR 119	0.46	0.74	NY 160	Florida Road in Princetown	Montgomery County line (becomes CR 152)	
CR 121	1.56	2.51	US 20	North Mansion Road in Duanesburg	CR 74	
CR 123	1.71	2.75	US 20 / NY 7	Depot Road in Duanesburg	CR 70	
CR 125	1.01	1.63	NY 7	Weaver Road in Duanesburg	CR 74	
CR 127	4.91	7.90	US 20	Duanesburg Chur in Duanesburg	NY 30	
CR 129	2.10	3.38	Montgomery County line	Levey Road in Duanesburg	NY 159	
CR 131	0.90	1.45	Albany County line (becomes CR 252)	Chadwick Road in Duanesburg	CR 74	
CR 133	1.12	1.80	Schoharie County line	Darby Hill Road in Duanesburg	NY 7 / NY 395 / CR 74 / CR 90	
CR 135	1.98	3.19	Schoharie County line (becomes CR 26)	Gallupville Road in Duanesburg	CR 133	
CR 137	1.03	1.66	Schoharie County line (becomes CR 25)	Barton Hill Road in Duanesburg	CR 135	
CR 139	1.11	1.79	US 20	Knight Road in Duanesburg	CR 86	
CR 141	2.40	3.86	US 20	Mcguire School in Duanesburg	NY 30 / CR 147	
CR 143	1.79	2.88	CR 86	Herrick Road in Duanesburg	NY 30	
CR 145	1.33	2.14	NY 30 / CR 102	Millers Corners Road in Duanesburg	Montgomery County line (becomes CR 142)	
CR 147	1.64	2.64	NY 30 / CR 141	Eatons Corners in Duanesburg	CR 102 / CR 149	
CR 149	0.80	1.29	CR 102 / CR 147	Mill Point Road in Duanesburg	Montgomery County line (becomes CR 140)	
CR 151	0.61	0.98	Schoharie County line (becomes CR 54)	Sheldon Road in Duanesburg	NY 7 / CR 153	
CR 153	2.39	3.85	NY 7 / CR 151	Youngs Road in Duanesburg	US 20	
CR 155	2.05	3.30	NY 30 at Schoharie County line (becomes CR 65)	Oak Hill Road in Duanesburg	NY 30	
CR 157	1.14	1.83	NY 30	Old Route 30 in Duanesburg	US 20	Former routing of NY 30
CR 158	4.29	6.90	NY 7	Rosendale Road in Niskayuna	NY 7 / Union Street (NY 911G)	Formerly NY 7C
CR 159	0.44	0.71	Schenectady city line	Union Street in Niskayuna	NY 911G at Balltown Road (NY 914T)	Entire length overlaps with NY 146
CR 160	0.29	0.47	NY 7 / NY 158	Guilderland Avenue in Rotterdam	Schenectady city line	Formerly part of NY 158
CR 161	0.53	0.85	NY 7 / NY 159 / CR 83	Broadway in Rotterdam	Schenectady city line	Former routing of NY 7

== See also ==
- County routes in New York
