= New York State Route 158 =

Highway in New York

New York State Route 158
- Map of eastern New York with NY 158 highlighted in red

Route information
- Maintained by NYSDOT
- Length: 5.82 mi (9.37 km)
- Existed: 1930–present

Major junctions
- South end: NY 146 in Guilderland
- US 20 in Guiderland
- North end: NY 7 in Rotterdam

Location
- Country: United States
- State: New York
- Counties: Albany, Schenectady

Highway system
- New York Highways; Interstate; US; State; Reference; Parkways
← NY 157A	→ NY 159

New York State Route 158 (NY 158) is a state highway in New York, running from near the Albany County village of Altamont to the Schenectady County town of Rotterdam, just outside Schenectady. NY 158 is a two-lane highway for all of its length.

== Route description ==
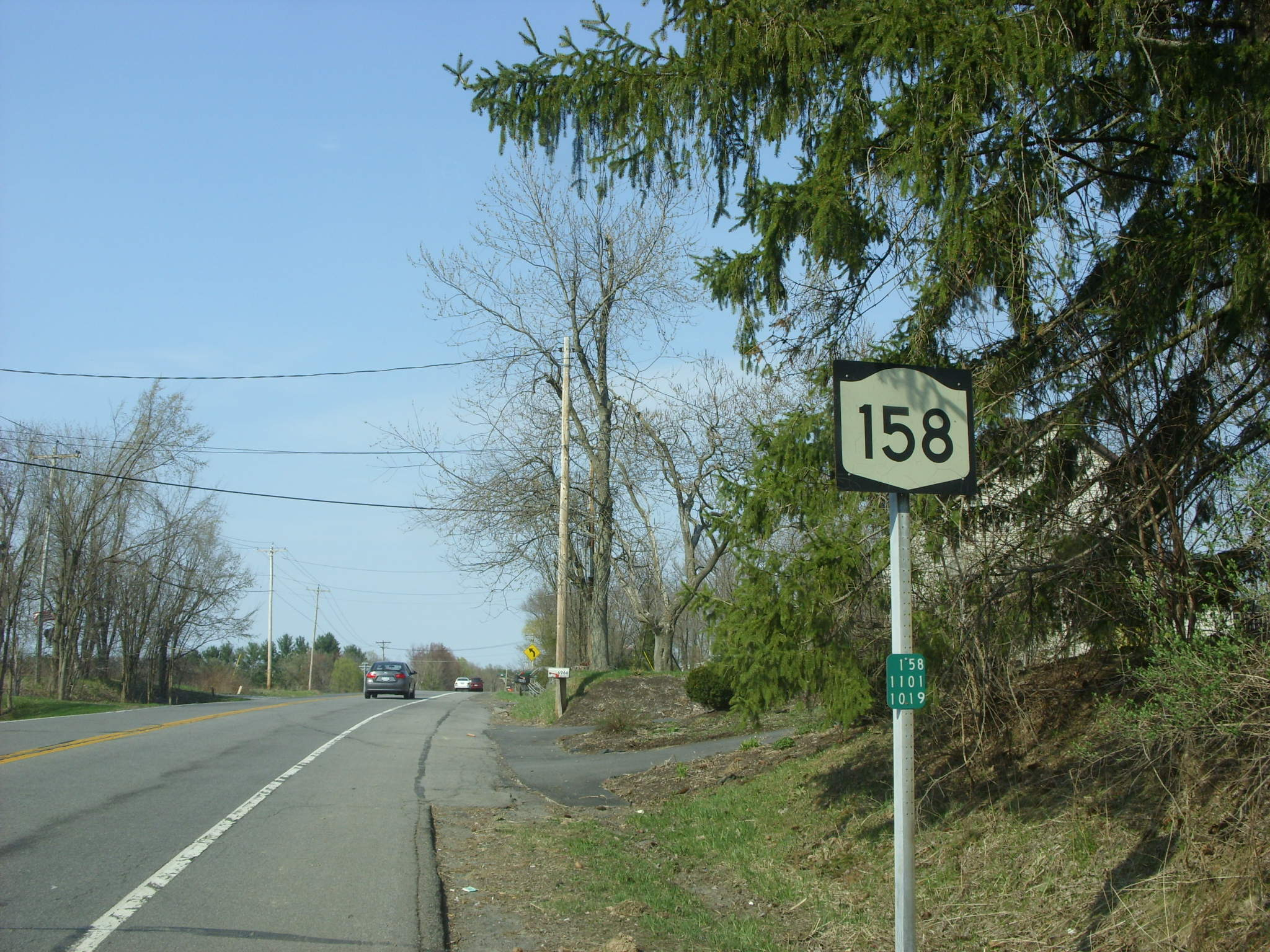
NY 158 through the town of Guiderland

NY 158 begins 1.5 miles (2.4 km) east of the village of Altamont at NY 146 in the town of Guilderland. NY 158 proceeds winding north alongside the Black Creek as a two-lane road through several residences, crossing over the Bozen Kill. Now paralleling the Bozen Kill, the route continues north through Guiderland as the waterway merges into the Watervliet Reservoir. At the northern end of the reservoir, NY 158 intersects with US 20 (Western Avenue). After US 20, the route continues north through Guiderland, winding through town as it gains the moniker of Guiderland Avenue. In the hamlet of Parkers Corners, NY 158 continues past some residences and an intersection with Old State Road. A short trek to the north and NY 158 crosses the line from Albany County to Schenectady County.

NY 158, now in the town of Rotterdam, continues north into the hamlet of Pine Grove as Guiderland Avenue. In Pine Grove, NY 158 bends northeast at a junction with the eastern terminus of NY 406 (Giffords Church Road). Crossing over a railroad line, the road passes a small housing complex before crossing under the New York State Thruway (I-90). After the Thruway, NY 158 enters the hamlet of Rotterdam, where Guiderland Avenue becomes a two-lane residential street. Crossing over another railroad grade, NY 158 turns north at Sunrise Boulevard. Just five blocks to the north of Sunrise, Guiderland Avenue intersects with NY 7 (Curry Road). This intersection serves as the northern terminus of NY 158 while the route continues north as County Route 160.

== History ==
NY 158 was assigned as part of the 1930 renumbering of state highways in New York. It initially began at NY 146 east of Altamont in Guilderland and followed its modern alignment north to Curry Road (now NY 7) in Rotterdam. From there, it continued north along Guilderland Avenue into Schenectady, where it ended at Broadway (then-NY 7). NY 7 was realigned c. 1962 to bypass downtown Schenectady on Curry Road. At the same time, NY 158 was truncated southward to end at the rerouted NY 7. The former alignment of NY 158 between Curry Road and the Schenectady city line remained state-maintained as a reference route until April 1, 1980, when ownership and maintenance of the highway was transferred from the state of New York to Schenectady County as part of a highway maintenance swap between the two levels of government. It was subsequently designated as County Route 160 by Schenectady County.

== Major intersections ==
County	Location	mi	km	Destinations	Notes
Albany	Guilderland	0.00	0.00	NY 146 – Guilderland Center, Altamont	Southern terminus
Albany	Guilderland	1.83	2.95	US 20 (Western Avenue) – Duanesburg, Albany	
Schenectady	Town of Rotterdam	3.88	6.24	NY 406 west (Giffords Church Road)	Eastern terminus of NY 406; hamlet of Pine Grove
Schenectady	Town of Rotterdam	5.82	9.37	NY 7 (Curry Road)	Northern terminus; neighborhood of South Schenectady
1.000 mi = 1.609 km; 1.000 km = 0.621 mi

== See also ==
- List of county routes in Schenectady County, New York
