= New York State Route 395 =

State highway in Schenectady County, New York, US

New York State Route 395
- Map of Schenectady County in eastern New York with NY 395 highlighted in red

Route information
- Maintained by NYSDOT
- Length: 2.39 mi (3.85 km)
- Existed: 1930–present

Major junctions
- South end: NY 7 in Duanesburg
- North end: US 20 in Duanesburg

Location
- Country: United States
- State: New York
- Counties: Schenectady

Highway system
- New York Highways; Interstate; US; State; Reference; Parkways
| ← NY 394 | → NY 396 |

New York State Route 395 (NY 395) is a state highway located within the town of Duanesburg in Schenectady County, New York, in the United States. It connects NY 7 to U.S. Route 20 (US 20) by way of the village of Delanson. The route was assigned as part of the 1930 renumbering of state highways in New York and has not been altered since.

== Route description ==
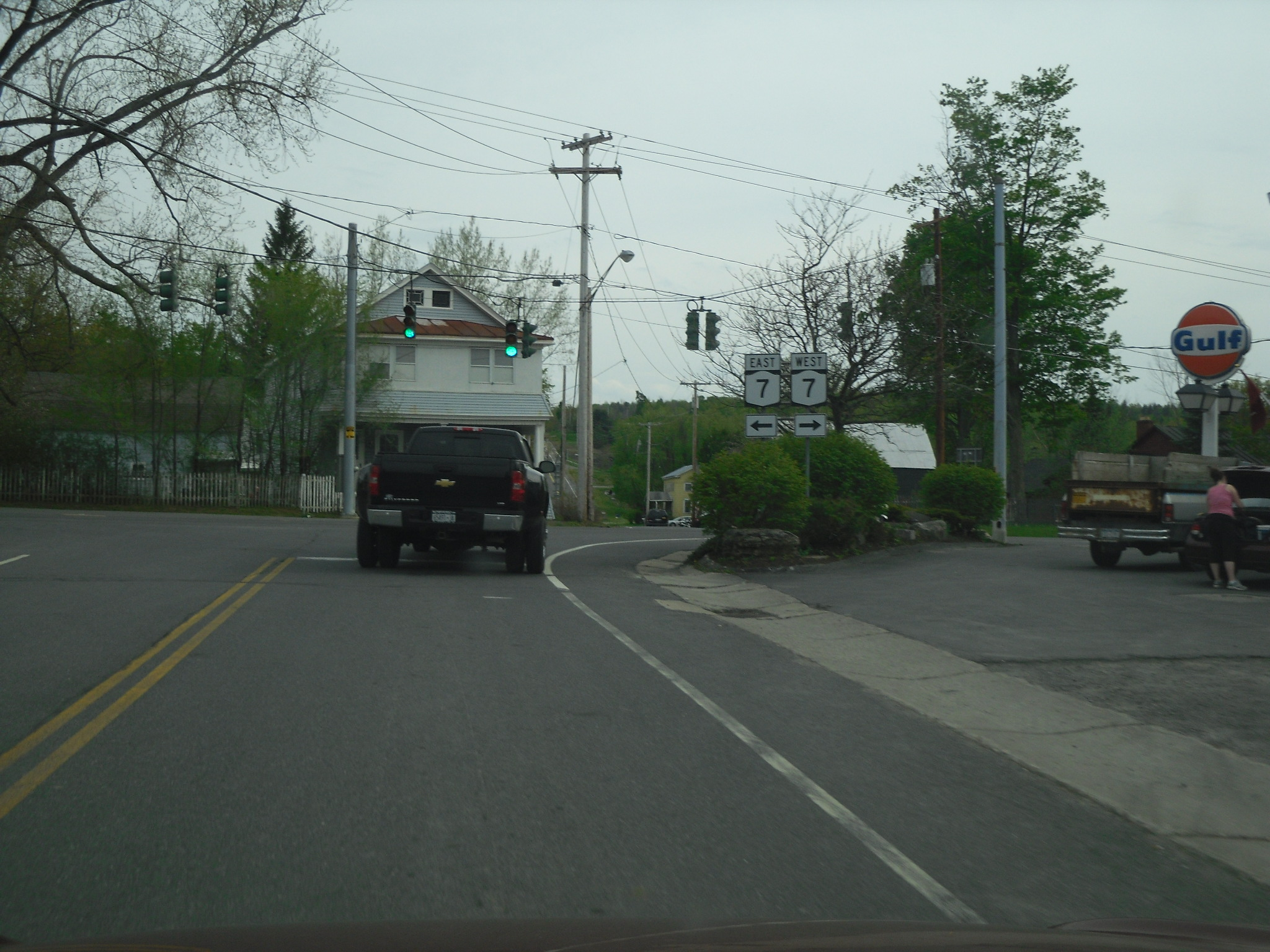
NY 395 southbound at the junction with NY 7 in Quaker Street

NY 395 begins at an intersection with NY 7 (Duanesburg Road), Darby Hill Road (unsigned County Route 133 or CR 133) and Schoharie Turnpike (CR 74) in the hamlet of Quaker Street in the town of Duanesburg. NY 395 proceeds north out of Quaker Street and through a residential section of Duanesburg, crossing a junction with East Shore Road (CR 80) before crossing into the village of Delanson. Now named Main Street, NY 395 crosses a railroad line into downtown Delanson as a two-lane residential street before turning northeast just north of Thousand Acres Road.

NY 395 continues northeast through the village of Delanson, reaching a junction with Cole Road (CR 84). At this junction, NY 395 turns northward once again, paralleling the railroad line back into Duanesburg. After a bend to the northwest, the route passes the Delanson Reservoir and reaches an intersection with US 20 (Western Turnpike). The right-of-way and the designation of NY 395 both terminate at the intersection, east of the Schoharie County line.

== History ==
On May 17, 1902, the state of New York let a contract to improve the 1.15-mile (1.85 km) section of modern NY 395 between Quaker Street and Delanson to state highway standards. The project cost $15,993 (equivalent to $573,082 in 2025) and took roughly one year to complete. The improved road was added to the state highway system on July 1, 1903. By 1926, all of what is now NY 395 was state-maintained. In the 1930 renumbering of state highways in New York, hundreds of state-maintained highways that did not have a posted route number were assigned one. One of these was the state highway running north–south through Delanson, which was designated as NY 395.

== Major intersections ==
The entire route is in Duanesburg, Schenectady County.

| mi | km | Destinations | Notes |
|---|---|---|---|
| 0.00 | 0.00 | NY 7 (Duanesburg Road) – Duanesburg, Cobleskill | Southern terminus; hamlet of Quaker Street |
| 2.39 | 3.85 | US 20 (Western Turnpike) – Esperance, Duanesburg | Northern terminus |
1.000 mi = 1.609 km; 1.000 km = 0.621 mi
