= U.S. Route 20 in New York =

Section of U.S. Highway in New York

U.S. Route 20
- Map of New York with US 20 highlighted in red and US 20 Truck in blue

Route information
- Maintained by NYSDOT and the cities of Albany and Auburn
- Length: 372.32 mi (599.19 km)
- Existed: November 11, 1926–present

Major junctions
- West end: US 20 at the Pennsylvania state line in Ripley
- US 62 in Hamburg; NY 400 at the West Seneca–Elma line; I-390 in Avon; I-81 / US 11 in LaFayette; NY 7 in Duanesburg; US 9W in Albany; I-787 / US 9 / NY 32 / South Mall Arterial in Albany; US 4 in East Greenbush; I-90 / US 9 in Schodack
- East end: US 20 at the Massachusetts state line in New Lebanon

Location
- Country: United States
- State: New York
- Counties: Chautauqua, Erie, Genesee, Livingston, Ontario, Seneca, Cayuga, Onondaga, Madison, Oneida, Otsego, Herkimer, Schoharie, Schenectady, Albany, Rensselaer, Columbia

Highway system
- United States Numbered Highway System; List; Special; Divided; New York Highways; Interstate; US; State; Reference; Parkways
← NY 19A	→ US 20A
← US 20A	NY 20B	→ NY 20C

U.S. Route 20 (US 20) is a part of the United States Numbered Highway System that runs from Newport, Oregon, to Boston, Massachusetts. In the U.S. state of New York, US 20 extends 372.32 miles (599.19 km) from the Pennsylvania state line at Ripley to the Massachusetts state line in the Berkshires. US 20 is the longest surface road in New York. It runs near the Lake Erie shore from Ripley to Buffalo and passes through the southern suburbs of Buffalo, the Finger Lakes, the glacial moraines of Central New York, and the city of Albany before crossing into Massachusetts. US 20 connects to all three major north–south Interstate Highways in Upstate New York: Interstate 390 (I-390) near Avon, I-81 south of Syracuse, and I-87 in Albany by way of Fuller Road Alternate.

With the exception of Albany, it passes directly through no major cities of the state, bypassing Syracuse and Utica by great distances to the south while the New York State Thruway and New York State Route 5 (NY 5), which share its corridor, pass right through or close to them. It skirts the southern and eastern suburbs of Buffalo. It is, however, a major artery in many of the outlying areas it passes through in the hilly fringes of the Allegheny Plateau, often expanding to four lanes (it has no limited-access sections, although many intersecting roads are grade-separated) with extensive commercial strip development. One of these sections, the easterly of two concurrencies with NY 5 across the northern Finger Lakes, is the second-longest surface-road concurrency in New York, behind only the concurrency of I-86 and NY 17 in the Southern Tier, extending 67 miles (108 km) from Avon to Auburn.

From Oneida County to Albany, the road follows the historic Cherry Valley Turnpike, built at the beginning of the 19th century to connect Albany and, at the time, the important villages of Sharon Springs, Cherry Valley, Richfield Springs, Cazenovia, and Skaneateles. US 20 itself was assigned in 1926 and was the state's main east–west route from that time until the Thruway was completed in the 1950s.

== Route description ==
US 20 enters Western New York closely paralleling the Lake Erie shoreline, the Thruway and NY 5. Passing through the southeastern suburbs of Buffalo, it assumes a due-east heading at Depew, taking it to the NY 5 overlap in Avon. The two roads pass through many of the communities at the north ends of the larger Finger Lakes, splitting in Auburn. Through Central New York and the Central New York Region to its east, US 20 drifts south into the rugged upper reaches of the Allegheny Plateau, distancing itself from the Thruway and NY 5 by as much as 20 miles (32 km) at some points.

In the Capital District, the three routes all converge again, and US 20 goes right through downtown Albany, the largest city along its route in New York. Just before crossing the Hudson River, US 20 is joined again by US 9 for its second-longest concurrency, which ends just before the Thruway's Berkshire section in Schodack Center. From there, it drifts southward into the Berkshires, crossing the Massachusetts state line west of Pittsfield.

All but 5.60 miles (9.01 km) of US 20's 372-mile (599 km) alignment in New York is maintained by the New York State Department of Transportation (NYSDOT). In Cayuga County, the 1.21-mile (1.95 km) section of US 20 in Auburn between NY 38A and the eastern city line is maintained by the city of Auburn. To the east in Albany County, the 4.39 miles (7.07 km) of US 20 in Albany from the western city line to the north end of the NY 32 overlap is also city-maintained.

=== Western New York ===
From the state line to the Buffalo suburbs, US 20 is largely a two-lane through road on the same northeastern heading it has followed most of the way from Cleveland. It serves as the main street of the few communities it passes directly through. In the Buffalo area, US 20 begins to head more east, widening to four lanes and becoming a busy regional artery that intersects many other roads of major and minor importance. For the five miles (8.0 km) leading into Depew, it runs due north along with NY 78 as part of Transit Road, a busy commercial strip east of the city. At Depew, US 20 leaves Transit Road and begins its journey east across the state. The surrounding countryside returns to farmland by the Genesee County line.

==== Lake Erie ====
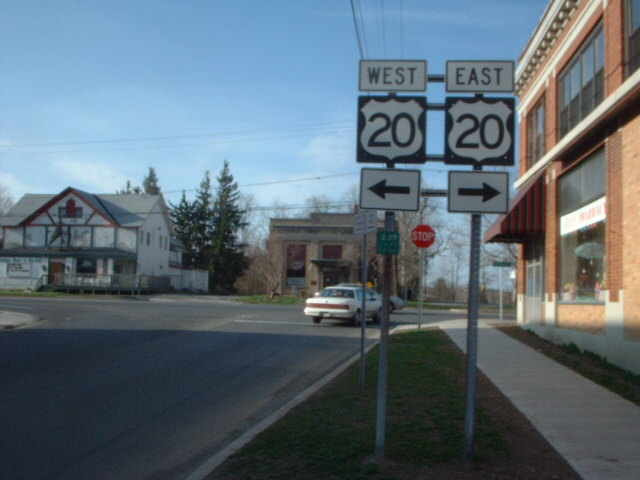
The former northern terminus of NY 239 at US 20 in Alden

US 20 enters New York immediately after passing through State Line, Pennsylvania. It remains on the northeasterly course it has been following as I-90, now the New York State Thruway, veers between it and what is now NY 5 in order to remain on level ground. This section of US 20 hugs the foot of the beach ridge to the south of Lake Erie, which is sometimes visible from sections of the highway, in Chautauqua County. A mile and a half (2.4 km) east of the state line, Shortman Road (unsigned NY 950D) leaves to the left for exit 61, the westernmost interchange on the Thruway. Shortly afterward, US 20 reaches its first settlement in New York, the hamlet of Ripley, where it intersects NY 76, the first touring route along US 20 in the state.

Another eight miles (13 km) of two-lane rural road, crossed at its midpoint by the onetime New York Central Railroad and now CSX Transportation mainline, brings US 20 into its first incorporated community, the village of Westfield. Here, NY 394 intersects US 20 in the middle of town on its way to the Thruway's next exit and the hamlet of Barcelona, where it encounters NY 5 and the lake. Beyond Westfield, US 20 begins to drift south, coming farther inland as it heads northeast. 16 miles (26 km) to the east, it reaches Fredonia, the largest village along its route so far. 20 intersects with NY 60 at Reed Corners at the eastern edge of Fredonia, which heads north to the neighboring city of Dunkirk. Two miles (3.2 km) east, NY 39 becomes the first state route to end at US 20. It makes a loop of nearly 100 miles (160 km) through the interior of the state to return to US 20 in the Finger Lakes.

Past this junction, the Thruway and US 20 begin to converge in flatter country until they cross as US 20 veers northward one mile (1.6 km) south of Silver Creek. US 20 Truck splits off from US 20 in the center of town and rejoins its parent northeast of the village. This portion of the truck route is cosigned as NY 5, and the first of two overlaps between US 20 and NY 5 begins here. The road resumes its northeasterly course to an access road to the Thruway's exit 58 at Irving. After crossing Cattaraugus Creek into Erie County, the concurrency ends, with NY 5 staying close to the lake and US 20 closely paralleling the Thruway. NY 438 leaves this junction to the east, following the creek into Cattaraugus Reservation.

US 20, which is now Southwestern Boulevard, remains straight when paralleling the Thruway, intersecting only one other state highway, NY 249, just east of the village of Farnham, in an 18-mile (29 km) stretch that brings it to the outer fringes of the Buffalo–Niagara Falls metropolitan area at Hamburg. Within two miles (3.2 km) of the junction with NY 75, which provides access to the Thruway, US 20 intersects US 62, the first U.S. Highway that it encounters in New York. Continuing on, US 20 crosses the Thruway to reach Big Tree. This hamlet was once home to a six-way intersection featuring US 20A, but a late 2000s reconstruction project moved the west end of US 20A to a new junction to the northeast. Like NY 39, US 20A makes a long loop through Wyoming and Livingston counties to return to US 20 in the Finger Lakes.

==== Buffalo area ====
After the US 20A split, US 20 begins moving away from the lake and trends more to the east-northeast. The road becomes more developed, and, one mile (1.6 km) ahead, a major Buffalo landmark looms to the south—Highmark Stadium, home of the Buffalo Bills. On home game days in the fall, traffic clogs the highway as it crosses over the US 219 expressway and curves northeast to reach the eastern terminus of NY 179 at Mile Strip Road. NY 179 offers access to US 219 via an interchange 0.75 miles (1.21 km) to the west. A half-mile (0.80 km) beyond, the four-lane US 20 intersects the concurrent routes of NY 240 and NY 277, the main route to the village of Orchard Park off to the south.

At the West Seneca town line, US 20 turns due east when Reserve Road merges in from the west. After another mile (1.6 km), the road makes a 90-degree left turn at NY 187's northern terminus. It is now headed due north as Transit Road, a busy regional route that continues north as far as Lockport. After yet another mile (1.6 km), NY 16 and NY 78 come in from East Aurora to the southeast. NY 16 continues west to downtown Buffalo while NY 78 turns north to join US 20. Just north of the junction, Transit Road connects to the entrance ramps for an interchange with the NY 400 freeway, US 20's first interchange with a limited-access highway since meeting the Thruway in Irving.

Shops and stores line busy Transit Road on both sides as it divides the towns of West Seneca and Elma. A mile (1.6 km) north of NY 400, US 20 and NY 78 reach another state highway, NY 354, near Ebenezer. Not far from that intersection, Cheektowaga and Lancaster replace West Seneca and Elma as the towns on either side of the road. Increasing development and traffic heralds Transit Road's entry into the village of Depew, and, at NY 130, US 20 turns east, ending the overlap and taking the direction it will follow for most of the rest of its crossing of the state.

==== East of Buffalo ====
Taking the name Broadway, which NY 130 had retained from the city of Buffalo, US 20 goes through downtown Depew before it proceeds into the neighboring village of Lancaster. It returns to a rural two-lane road beyond Lancaster, passing through a traffic light only at the small village of Alden before crossing into Genesee County. In the town of Darien, US 20 continues straight past Darien Lakes State Park to the junction with NY 77 at Darien Center, where much summertime traffic turns north toward nearby Six Flags Darien Lake. NY 238 forks off to the southeast towards Attica at a junction two miles (3.2 km) to the east of Darien Center.

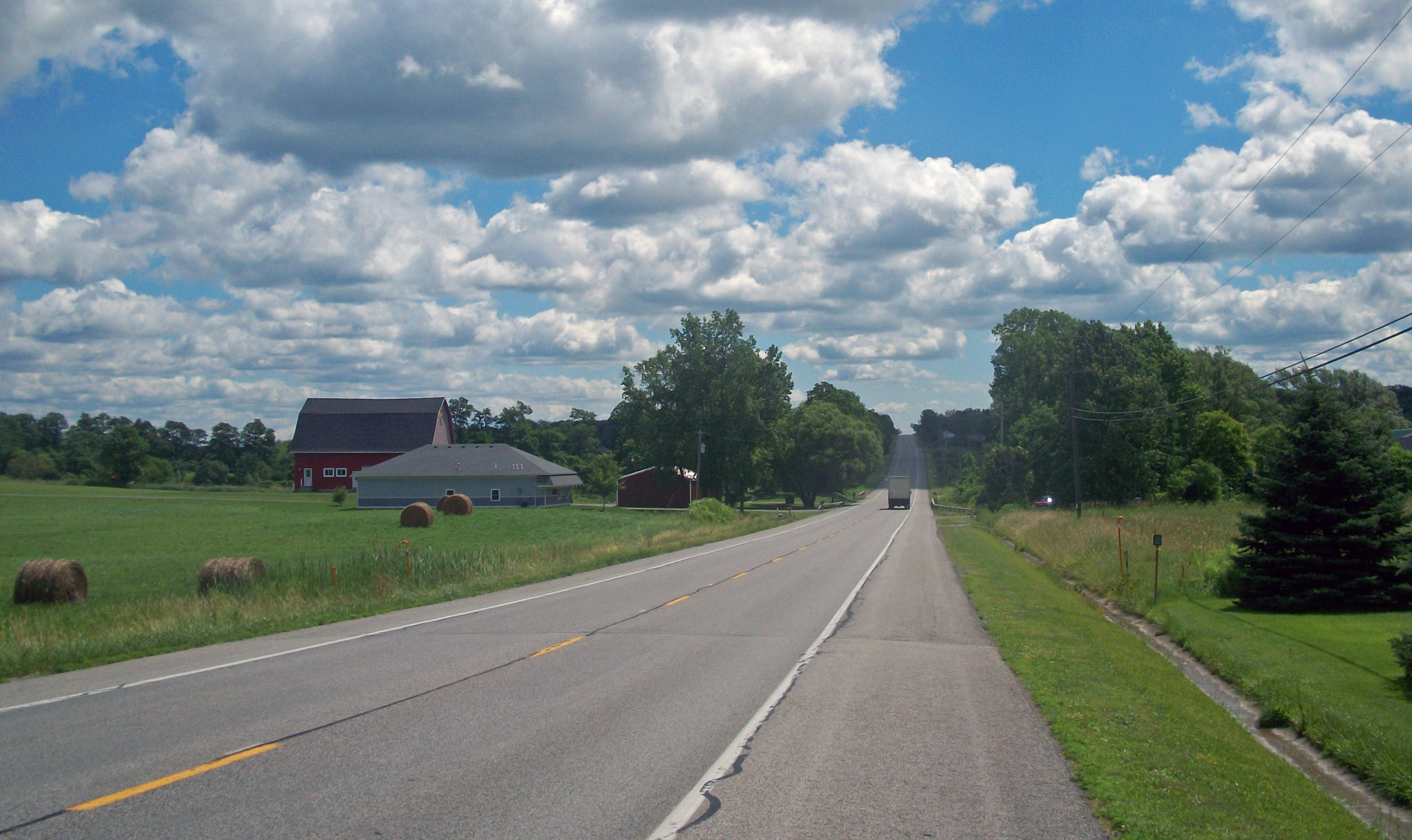
Dip in Genesee County

Past the junction with NY 238, which forks off to the southeast toward Attica, the highway begins going straight up and down into the creek valleys here at the northern fringe of the Allegheny Plateau. Passing lanes are sometimes available on the downhill sections, particularly in the next community to the east, Alexander, where another route to Attica, NY 98 crosses via an overpass. This allows traffic to continue at a high speed through the surrounding dairy and sod farms up the other side and into Bethany, the next town, whose four four-way intersections offer only blinking yellow lights and no stop or yield traffic control devices to slow down drivers.

This unbroken stretch ends with a new light shortly into the next town, Pavilion, where NY 63 crosses at an angle. Here, traffic bound for the Southern Tier and farther turn right to eventually connect to I-390 at Mount Morris. The four-lane US 20 straightaway continues across the town, with NY 19 also on an overpass at Pavilion Center. US 20 goes on past the Livingston County line 2.5 miles (4.0 km) to the east, where it finally drops the Broadway name. After another two miles (3.2 km), the route enters the hamlet of Fraser, where the north–south NY 36 crosses US 20 on its way from Mount Morris to Caledonia. US 20 continues on to the community of Canawaugus six miles (9.7 km) to the east, where NY 5 enters from the village of Caledonia to the northwest and rejoins US 20. The two routes continue east from here to the village of Avon.

=== NY 5 concurrency and Finger Lakes ===
The 67-mile (108 km) concurrency that begins here is the longest in the state, and it carries the two routes across the northern Finger Lakes region, a section of the plateau where glaciers carved deep valleys only to fill them with their meltwater. The land around the road is gently hilly, often wide open and heavily farmed, on the outermost fringes of the Rochester area. NY 39 is the first highway that intersects the concurrency, ending its loop just west of the traffic circle at Avon's center. About two miles (3.2 km) east of Avon, NY 5 and US 20 intersect NY 15, followed shortly by I-390, a north–south highway connecting US 20 and NY 5 to Rochester in the north and Corning in the south. In the village of Lima five miles (8.0 km) ahead, NY 5 and US 20 meet NY 15A, the eastern alternate route of NY 15. Just east of the village, the road crosses Honeoye Creek and enters Ontario County.

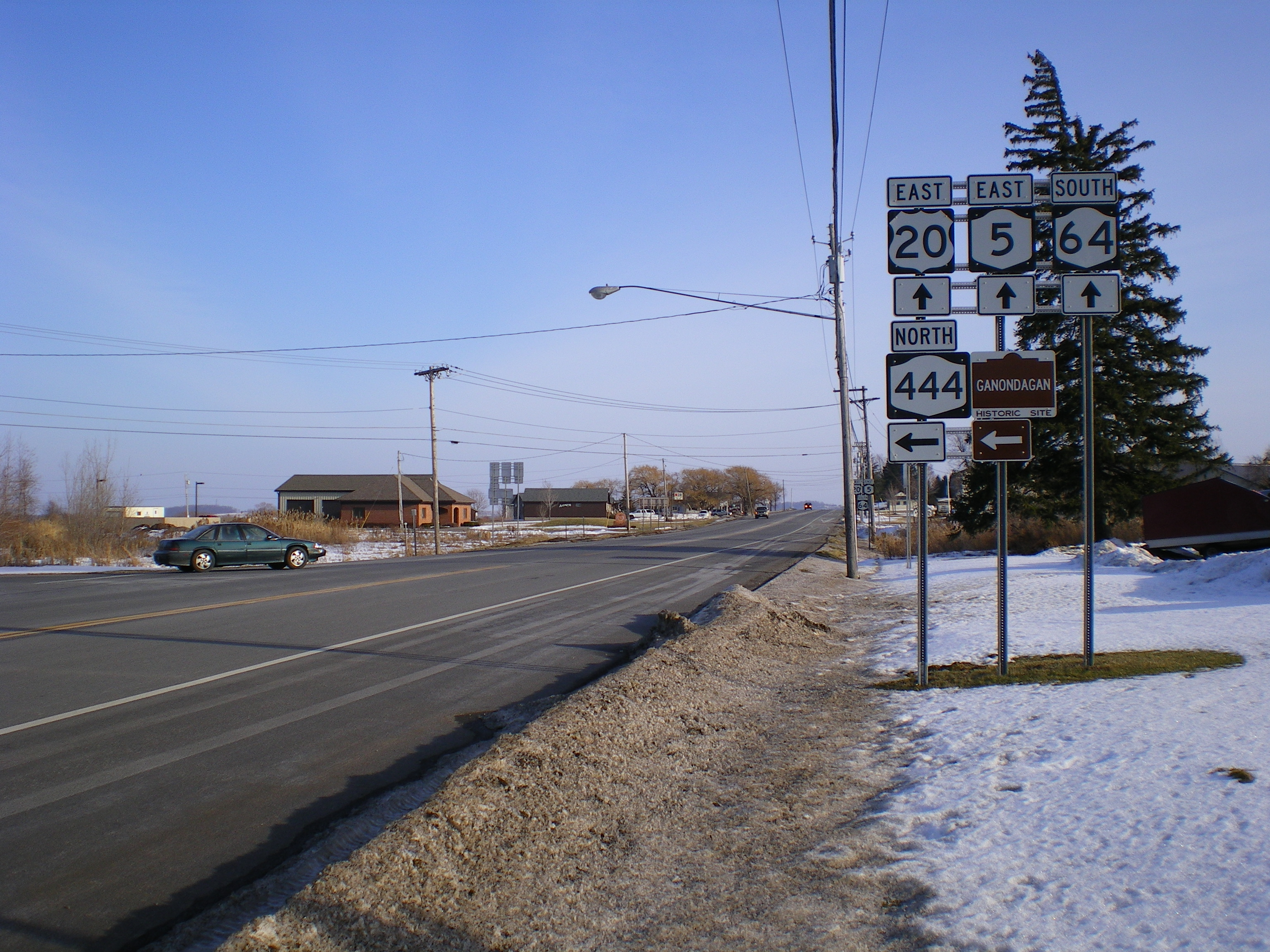
US 20 eastbound at NY 444 near Bloomfield

Across the county line, US 20 and NY 5 pass through the town and hamlet of West Bloomfield, where NY 65 comes to an end from the left. Next, in neighboring East Bloomfield, NY 444 leaves to the north for Victor and NY 64 joins the concurrency. NY 64 leaves three miles (4.8 km) later at the eastern end of US 20A in South Bloomfield. The highway continues through the open, rolling lake country to a junction with West Avenue west of the city of Canandaigua. At this point, NY 5 and US 20 turn southward to follow a bypass around the western and southern edge of the city. At Bristol Road, the first highway that the bypass crosses, NY 21 joins US 20 and NY 5 and follows both routes to Canandaigua, where a hill west of downtown offers a view to Canandaigua Lake, the first of the lakes it passes in this region.

In downtown Canandaigua, NY 21 leaves to join NY 332, a prime route from Canandaigua and the lake region to the eastern suburbs of Rochester via I-490. Past NY 332, the highway runs past the lowlands abutting the lakes to a junction with NY 364, which heads south down the east side of the lake. Now named Eastern Boulevard, the routes continue past Finger Lakes Community College to the next southbound highway, NY 247. Roughly 10 miles (16 km) of open road climb the gentle rise dividing Canandaigua and Seneca lakes, the latter of which is the largest of the Finger Lakes. This ascent is subsequently met by a descent, passing over Flint Creek as the highway heads toward Geneva.

Just outside the city in the Lenox Park neighborhood of the town of Geneva, another pair of routes, NY 14A and NY 245, come to their northern end. After entering the city and passing the campus of Hobart and William Smith Colleges, NY 5 and US 20 cross under NY 14A's parent route, NY 14, just before the lake shore. US 20 and NY 5 continue along the water as a four-lane road with a median and cross into Seneca County at the lake's outlet. As at Canandaigua, a southbound route, NY 96A, leaves just past the lake. NY 5 and US 20 continue on, following the northern edge of the Cayuga–Seneca Canal toward the village of Waterloo.

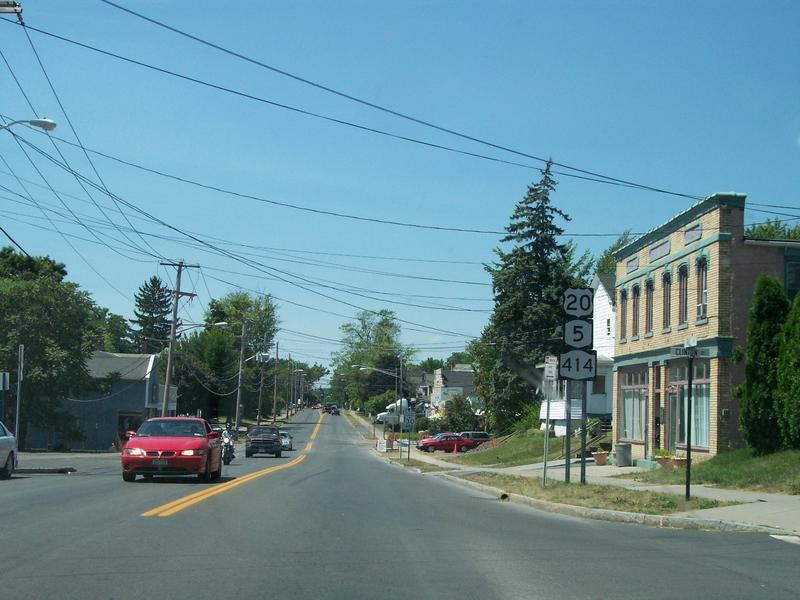
US 20, NY 5, and NY 414 in Seneca Falls

About 3 miles (5 km) east of NY 96A, US 20 and NY 5 reach that route's parent route, NY 96, in the center of Waterloo. Just outside the village, NY 414, a major north–south highway, creates another three-route concurrency when it joins from the north. It lasts for just 2 miles (3.2 km) to the center of Seneca Falls, home to Women's Rights National Historical Park and the National Women's Hall of Fame. Here, NY 414 departs to the south to follow the lake down to Watkins Glen while NY 5 and US 20 turn to the northeast at Van Cleef Lake.

This heading lasts for three miles (4.8 km) until NY 318 ends to the west right before a four-way intersection at NY 89. From here, the road runs straight in a slightly more easterly direction south of Montezuma National Wildlife Refuge, where the Thruway is briefly visible to the north, before entering Cayuga County as it crosses over the Cayuga–Seneca Canal. In Cayuga County, the highway briefly returns to the east before a junction with NY 90. The highway subsequently turns southeast and back east over the next eight miles (13 km) as it approaches Auburn. NY 326 departs to the south at the western city limits. Roughly one mile (1.6 km) into the city, the roadway briefly splits as NY 34 and NY 38 briefly join. At NY 38A, the overlap between NY 5 and US 20 comes to an end as the two routes go their separate ways.

=== Central New York ===
While NY 5 heads north from the split toward Syracuse and the Thruway, US 20 keeps to its easterly heading, following East Genesee Street out of the city, proceeding past Auburn Correctional Facility to the Onondaga County line. Here, NY 41A comes in from the south at the western end of the village of Skaneateles, a community at the north end of the eponymous lake, the last Finger Lake along US 20. NY 321 leaves to the north in the center of town, and NY 41A's parent route, NY 41, begins its long journey to the Southern Tier on the other side of Skaneateles. US 20 continues east for another 1.25 miles (2.01 km) out of the village to the south end of NY 175, after which it starts trending southward, returning to two lanes.

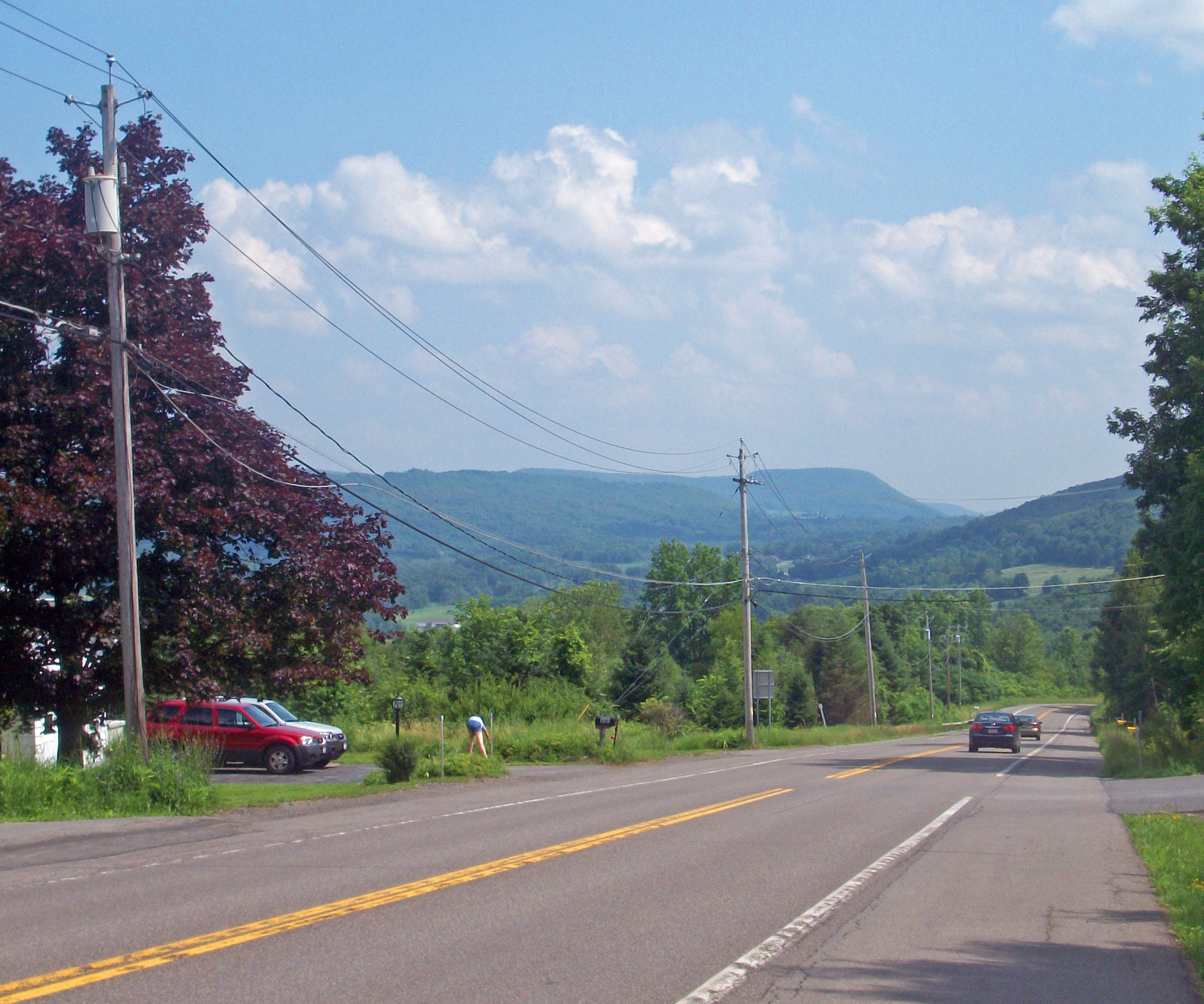
View at Big Bend, east of LaFayette

The landscape starts to grow hillier as it begins to cross the glacial moraines of the less populated reaches of southern Onondaga County. About three miles (4.8 km) east of NY 175, US 20 is briefly joined by NY 174, which goes to Otisco Lake, the easternmost Finger Lake. The southward trend continues for another six miles (9.7 km) to an intersection with NY 80, a signed east–west route running north–south at this point. East of NY 80, it drops into the Onondaga Creek valley to connect to the northern terminus of NY 11A four miles (6.4 km) to the east before climbing the next ridge to LaFayette, where it intersects I-81 at exit 15 and meets its paralleling surface route, US 11 at junctions 0.5 miles (0.80 km) apart. At this point, US 20 is 15 miles (24 km) south of the Thruway.

From LaFayette, it drops into another deep valley, curving around an area known as Big Bend, prior to climbing back up five miles (8.0 km) towards the crest of the ridge at Pompey. Here, US 20 and NY 91 intersect at an elevation of 1,700 feet (520 m) above sea level. After another two miles (3.2 km), the road drops down into the Limestone Creek valley and crosses into Madison County as it curves back up into higher ground. Another two miles (3.2 km) brings US 20 to the eastern terminus of NY 92, the south end of Cazenovia Lake and the village of Cazenovia itself. Its main street is marked by a brief concurrency with NY 13, a long, curving north–south route that comes from the cities of Ithaca and Cortland to the south.

East of Cazenovia, US 20 resumes its southward drift as it climbs into the high ground again and expands to four lanes, passing the small village of Morrisville in the process. It descends from there to its next state highway, NY 46, where it reverts to two lanes for a brief concurrency, after which NY 46 leaves for isolated Hamilton. The southern trend reverses itself after this junction, with first NY 26 and later NY 12B joining US 20 to create another three-route overlap. This persists for three very straight miles (4.8 km) until both leave to the north in the town of Madison. After another two miles (3.2 km), the highway crosses into Oneida County.

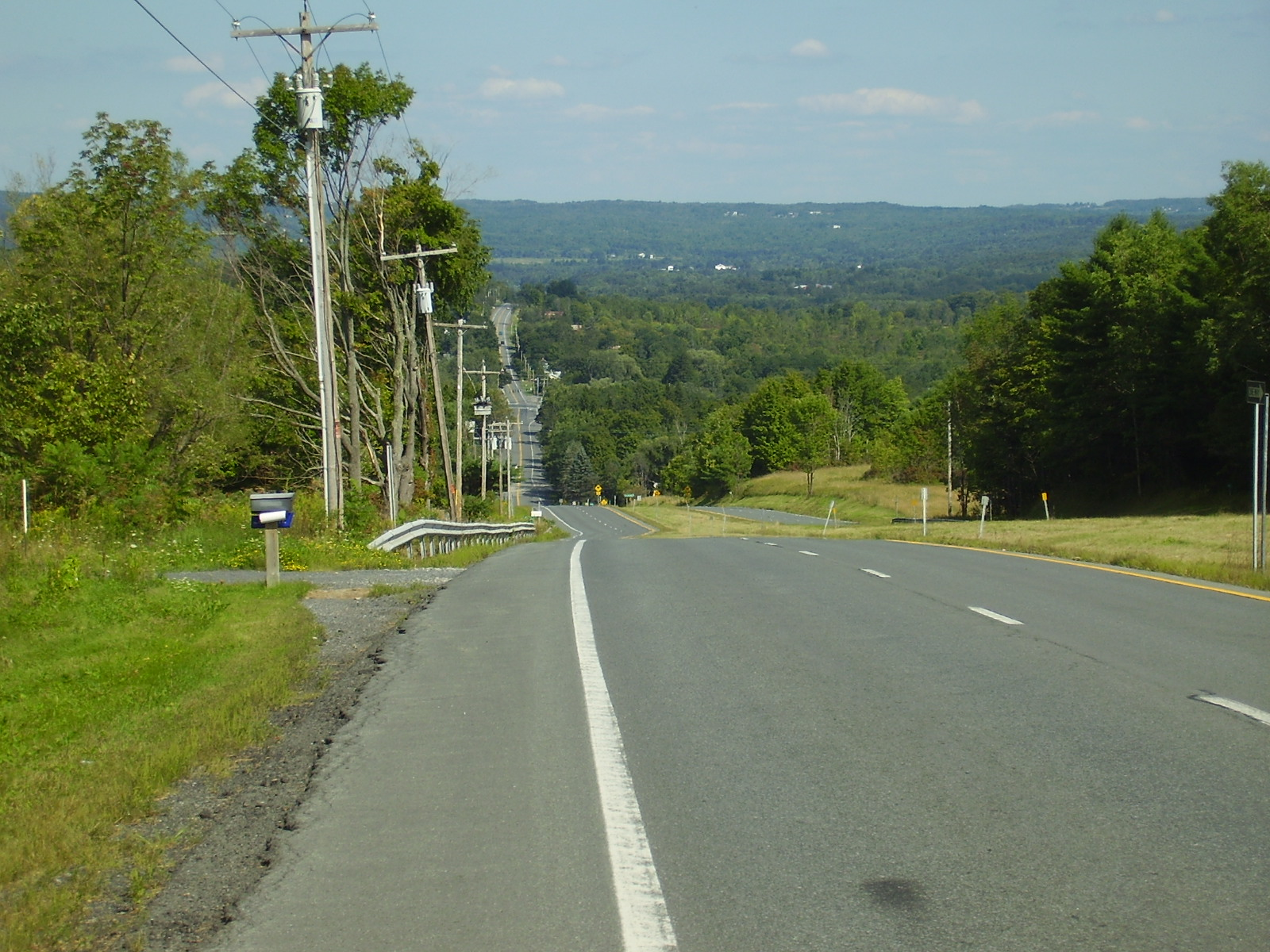
Typically rugged stretch of US 20 in Central New York

The major intersection here is NY 12, another long north–south route, three miles (4.8 km) into the county at Sangerfield, one mile (1.6 km) south of Waterville. From this intersection, US 20 takes the name Cherry Valley Turnpike from the historic road it follows towards Albany. US 20 climbs back into the high ground afterward and veers farther southward to the next intersection with a major north–south highway, NY 8, at Bridgewater. Like NY 12, it leads northward to the city of Utica. After NY 8, the road crosses the headwaters of the Unadilla River into Otsego County.

=== Leatherstocking Region ===
US 20 enters Otsego County only for a mile (1.6 km), where it intersects County Route 18 (CR 18) which is the northern terminus of former NY 413, then enters Herkimer County next to the point where Herkimer, Otsego, and Oneida county lines converge. The highway is briefly in Herkimer County for about 173 feet (53 m), before entering into Oneida County. US 20 continues for about 0.6 miles (0.97 km) before entering back into Herkimer County, which brings it into the Leatherstocking Region, where James Fenimore Cooper set his Leatherstocking Tales. This section of the highway keeps trending south as it skirts the northern edge of the Catskill Mountains, offering scenic valley vistas to the south. To the north the land levels to the Mohawk Valley. Through much of this stretch, the road expands to four lanes as the region's main east–west artery.

As it enters the county, it enters West Winfield and begins to overlap NY 51 which comes in from the south. This overlap lasts for three miles (4.8 km) to Birmingham Corners, where NY 51 turns north toward Ilion, as US 20 continues east and soon reenters Otsego County. Trending southeast in the town of Richfield, six miles (9.7 km) pass before NY 28 briefly overlaps US 20 just west of Richfield Springs, a popular local shopping destination, on its long curve across the state from the Catskill Mountains to the Adirondack Mountains. NY 167 begins a few blocks farther east, and US 20 returns to Herkimer County one mile (1.6 km) beyond that, intersecting only county roads over the next several miles.

A mile (1.6 km) after returning to Otsego County, NY 80 again intersects on its way from Cooperstown and Otsego Lake to the south to Fort Plain to the north. The next seven miles (11 km) of US 20 swing around the north end of the east ridge of Cherry Valley into the town of that name, where NY 166 leaves at a partial interchange to follow the valley south to Milford. After another swing around the valley's other ridge, US 20 crosses into Schoharie County. About two miles (3.2 km) from the county line, the highway intersects another long north–south route, NY 10, south of Sharon Springs. US 20 proceeds for another five miles (8.0 km) to Sharon, where NY 145 provides a route to Cobleskill to the south. Shortly after this junction, US 20 straightens out and follows an almost due-east heading for 11 miles (18 km) to its intersection with NY 30A and the southern terminus of NY 162 at Sloansville. The route continues east to Esperance, where it crosses Schoharie Creek to enter Schenectady County.

=== Capital District ===
The crossing of the Schoharie Creek brings US 20 into the first of three counties that make up the Capital District area. Here, development along the road increases and the road itself is often four lanes. The region is divided by the Hudson River, where US 20 begins its second-longest concurrency with US 9, the state's longest north–south U.S. Highway.

==== West of the Hudson River and Albany ====
Just past the county line, another Catskills-to-Canada highway, NY 30, intersects with US 20. About three miles (4.8 km) beyond that is the northern terminus of short NY 395, which runs south to the ever-closer NY 7. US 20 veers closer to NY 7 before finally intersecting the highway three miles (4.8 km) from NY 395. Not far to the east is an interchange with I-88, NY 7's paralleling freeway between Binghamton and Schenectady. Access to I-88 is via a shared access road from both routes due to the oblique angle of the intersection. From here, the highway, now known as Western Turnpike, continues to trend to the south for another four miles (6.4 km) to the southern terminus of NY 406 at the hamlet of Gifford. Shortly afterward, US 20 enters Albany County as the Helderberg Escarpment looms to the south.

It stays straight to its first major intersection, the northern terminus of NY 397 a mile (1.6 km) later, which is followed two miles (3.2 km) later by a junction with NY 158 just east of Watervliet Reservoir. After another 1.5 miles (2.4 km), CSX Transportation's main line crosses over the highway again. Development begins to pick up where NY 146 comes in from the north for a short overlap that ends at Hartmans Corners and Tawasentha Park. The road reaches the Albany suburbs two miles (3.2 km) to the east, where NY 155 intersects US 20 in Westmere. Just beyond the community is Crossgates Mall, a major Albany-area destination. Immediately east of the mall is US 20's first crossing of the Thruway, now I-87, since the southern Buffalo suburbs, and the southern end of Fuller Road Alternate, an unsigned spur of the Adirondack Northway, in an area known as McKownville.

A half-mile (0.80 km) later, the busy four-lane route passes the south side of the State University of New York at Albany's highly modernistic campus. It continues into the city of Albany itself as Western Avenue. Commercial developments line both sides of US 20 to the interchange with NY 85, a truncated freeway that connects to US 20 via the adjacent Dayton and Ormond streets. The neighborhoods around the road become primarily residential at this point. Roughly one mile (1.6 km) from NY 85, US 20 forks right onto Madison Avenue and passes the College of Saint Rose.

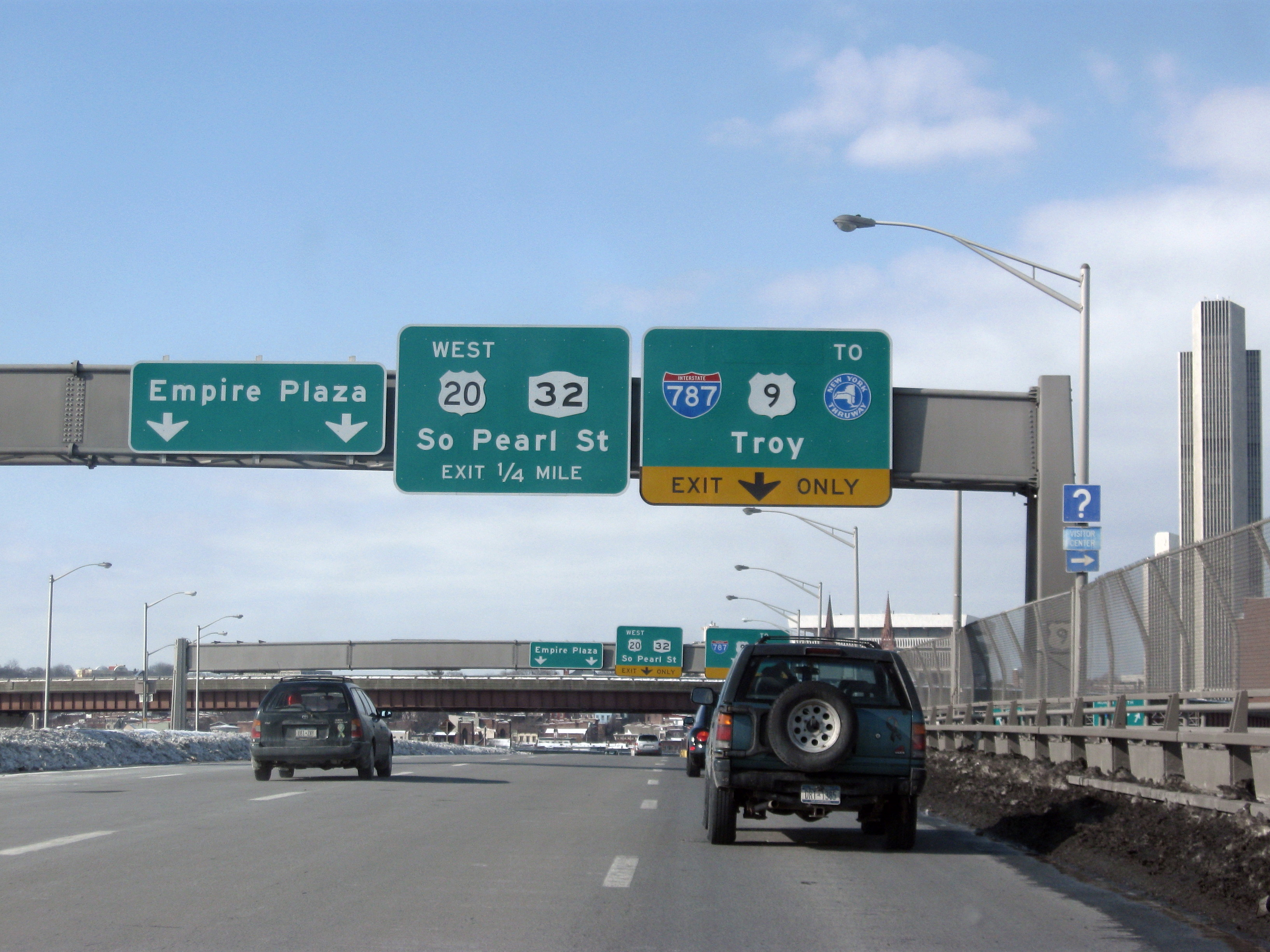
US 20 as it crosses the Dunn Memorial Bridge along with US 9

After Washington Park on the north side, downtown Albany draws nearer, with Erastus Corning Tower, the tallest building in the state outside of New York City, rising ahead. US 9W crosses Madison from Delaware Avenue to Lark Street, with its concurrent NY 443 terminating on the southern side of the intersection where Delaware ends at Madison. Shortly afterward, US 20 runs along the south side of Empire State Plaza, the modern complex that houses the offices of state legislators and many executive branch agencies. A few blocks farther is South Pearl Street, also NY 32, a long route from the lower Hudson Valley to Glens Falls. US 20 follows two blocks of South Pearl Street and NY 32 to reach an interchange with the South Mall Arterial. US 20 leaves NY 32 here, following an eastern extension of the arterial to the complex interchange connecting I-787 with US 9 and US 20. US 9 joins US 20 amid the junction, and both routes crosses the Hudson via the Dunn Memorial Bridge, the southernmost free crossing of the Hudson.

==== East of the Hudson River: US 9 and the Berkshires ====
At the east end of the bridge, US 9 and US 20, now in the city and county of Rensselaer, follow the offramps past the stubs built for the canceled South Mall Expressway and assume a southeastern course along a busy four-lane strip containing a center turn lane. Near the city limit, NY 9J leaves to the south to follow the river's east bank down to Stockport. The road subsequently goes up a hill with a panoramic view of the Albany skyline behind it and proceeds into the town of East Greenbush, where NY 151 heads off to the northeast. After two miles (3.2 km) with heavy commercial development on either side of the road, US 4 begins and leaves to the north at a busy intersection. The center of town follows, after which the concurrency enters Schodack.

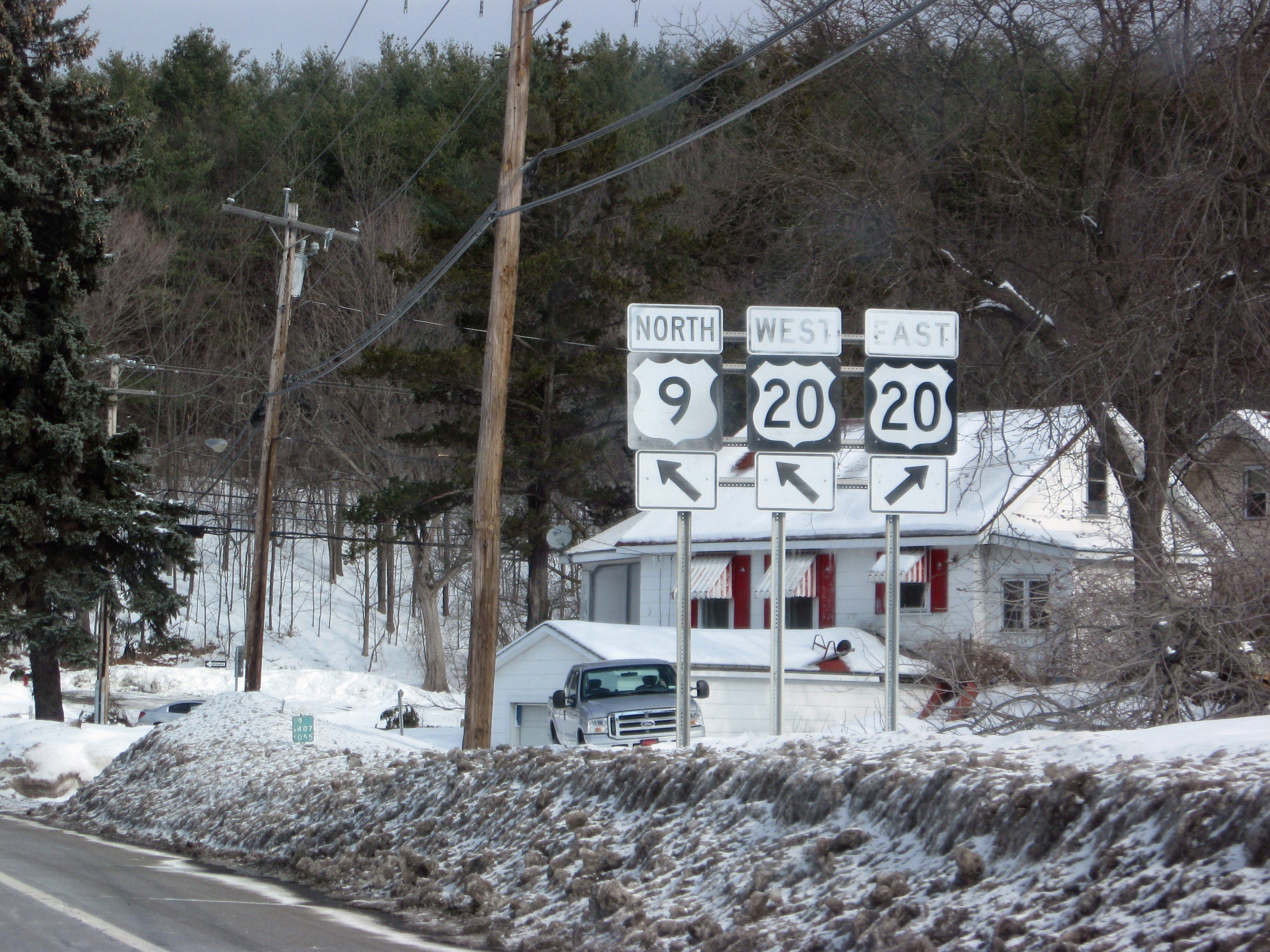
US 20 merges here with US 9 in Schodack

In Schodack, development along the road begins to ease as the center turn lane gives way to a double yellow line. At Schodack Center, located four miles (6.4 km) from East Greenbush, I-90 and US 20 meet again for the first time in 300 miles (480 km). Just after the interchange, NY 150 comes to its southern end and US 9 and US 20 split at junctions less than 0.5 miles (0.80 km) apart. While US 9 heads south for Poughkeepsie and the city of New York, US 20 reverts to two lanes and maintains its southeastern course for another two miles (3.2 km) before turns more to the east for another two miles (3.2 km). In Nassau, it connects to the north end of NY 203. East of the village, the terrain becomes hillier, indicating that US 20 has reached the edge of the Berkshires.

About two miles (3.2 km) outside of the village of Nassau, NY 66 joins the road. This overlap ends just before the Columbia County line, with NY 66 following a southerly course toward Chatham. US 20, meanwhile follows Kinderhook and Wyomanock creeks, through narrow, wooded valleys to New Lebanon, passing Mount Lebanon Shaker Society, a National Historic Landmark as the second-oldest Shaker settlement in the country. In the center of this small town, US 20 meets NY 22, the longest north–south route in the state, and the two form a one-mile (1.6 km) overlap, US 20's last concurrency in New York. After the split, US 20 makes a wide turn and heads almost south up a mountainside, climbing into Massachusetts near Pittsfield State Forest a mile (1.6 km) later.

== History ==
=== Origins ===
The road from Albany heading west was first constructed as a toll road or turnpike at the end of the 18th century. The First Great Western Turnpike Corporation was chartered in 1799 to build a road from Albany, the capital of New York, to the Revolutionary War frontier town of Cherry Valley. In 1803, a second corporation, the Third Great Western Turnpike, was chartered to further extend the road to Cazenovia. The Third Great Western Turnpike was completed as planned by 1811 and was heavily used by people trying to establish new settlements in central New York. The two turnpikes, collectively known as the Cherry Valley Turnpike, became a stagecoach route in 1816. The Cherry Valley Turnpike name was also later applied to an untolled extension of the road west to Skaneateles.

The establishment of the Erie Canal and the Utica and Schenectady Railroad slowly ate away at the revenues of the Cherry Valley Turnpike. The turnpike stopped being a toll road in 1857. A similar turnpike east of the Hudson River, connecting Rensselaer to the Massachusetts state line was also established in 1799 as the Rensselaer and Columbia Turnpike. This turnpike remained in operation as late as 1896, but it eventually folded around the turn of the 20th century. The state took over the maintenance of highways at the beginning of the 20th century and began paving many roads across the state. In 1908, the legislature created a statewide system of unsigned legislative routes that used these new state highways and other, yet-to-be improved roads.

=== Early designations ===
Several parts of the former Cherry Valley and Rensselaer and Columbia turnpikes were included in the new route system. East of the Hudson River, the Rensselaer and Columbia Turnpike became part of Route 1 from Schodack Center to Rensselaer and part of Route 21 from Nassau east to the Massachusetts state line. West of Albany, the Cherry Valley Turnpike was designated as part of Route 9 from Cazenovia to Bouckville and as part of Route 8 from there to a point south of Oriskany Falls. Another section, from Bridgewater to East Winfield, was included in Route 23. In 1912, the segment of the turnpike between Sharon and Sharon Springs became part of the new Route 38-a.

Farther west, Route 6 and Route 18 were assigned in 1908 to two major east–west roads connecting Buffalo to Albany and the Pennsylvania state line, respectively. West of modern-day Utica, Route 6 followed the old Genesee Road, a highway that passed through Auburn, Geneva, Avon, and Batavia on its way to Buffalo. The easternmost leg of Route 6 in Guilderland and Albany used a portion of the Cherry Valley Turnpike. Route 18, meanwhile, utilized a series of highways that ran either along or slightly inland from Lake Erie. All of Route 18 and most of Route 6—including all of the route west of Auburn—later became part of the Yellowstone Trail, an early cross-country auto trail established in 1912. East of Albany, the trail utilized the old Rensselaer and Columbia Turnpike.

On March 1, 1921, the legislature redefined the legislative route system, altering or removing several routes and adding others. Routes 6 and Route 18 were left virtually unchanged, as was the portion of Route 1 north of Schodack Center. Route 21, however, was altered to follow modern NY 66 between Averill Park and East Nassau. In the Central New York Region, Route 38-a was redesignated as Route 39 and extended west along the Cherry Valley Turnpike to meet Route 8 near Oriskany Falls. From Bridgewater to Oriskany Falls, Route 39 overlapped with Route 23. The legislative route system remained New York's primary route numbering system until the mid-1920s.

=== Assignment ===
Highways were first publicly numbered in New York in 1924. One of the handful of routes assigned at this time was NY 5, a cross-state route that extended from the Pennsylvania line in the west to the Massachusetts line in the east. From Auburn west, it initially utilized all of legislative Route 18 and the portion of Route 6 east of Avon. In between Buffalo and Avon, NY 5 used a linear, previously unnumbered east–west road to the south that bypassed the communities along Route 6. Continuing east from Auburn, NY 5 followed the Cherry Valley Turnpike (partially Route 6, Route 8, Route 9, Route 23, and Route 39) to Albany and the Rensselaer and Columbia Turnpike (partially Route 1 and Route 21) to Massachusetts.

One or two years later, however, the portion of NY 5 from Buffalo to Albany was shifted north to its modern alignment—mostly old legislative Route 6—and the former, more southerly route was designated as New York State Route 7 (NY 7). Around the same time, a parallel route to the south, from Buffalo through East Aurora and Geneseo to near Avon, was designated as NY 35. NY 7 and NY 35 were both short-lived designations as US 20 was assigned on November 11, 1926, as part of the establishment of the U.S. Numbered Highway System. When the U.S. Highway was first posted in New York in 1927, it was assigned to then-NY 5 from the Pennsylvania line to near Hamburg, a previously unnumbered but state-maintained highway between Hamburg and East Aurora, NY 35 from East Aurora to Geneseo, NY 7 between Skaneateles and Albany, and NY 5 from Albany to the Massachusetts line. US 20 overlapped with NY 5 between Avon and Skaneateles. The old NY 7 from Buffalo to Avon was renumbered to NY 35.

=== Realignments ===
In the 1930 state highway renumbering, an alternate route of US 20 between Irving and Hamburg became NY 20B. While US 20 ran along the shore of Lake Erie between the two locations, NY 20B followed a more inland alignment that took it east of Angola. US 20 was realigned c. 1932 to follow NY 20B between the two locations. The former lakeside routing of US 20 became part of an extended NY 5. Around the same time, the portion of Southwestern Boulevard between US 20 and NY 78 (now NY 187) in the towns of Hamburg and Orchard Park was designated as part of NY 18C. This segment of NY 18C was renumbered to NY 278 c. 1935. Farther east, US 20 was realigned c. 1931 to pass through Lakeville on its way from Geneseo to East Avon.

The most substantial realignment in US 20's New York history occurred c. 1938 when it was shifted north onto its current alignment between Hamburg and East Avon, replacing NY 278 and NY 35. Most of the previous route via East Aurora and Geneseo initially became NY 20A; however, that route was partially redesignated as US 20A by the following year. In the mid-1950s, a new four-lane roadway, Eastern Boulevard, was built north of Lake Shore Drive between South Main Street in Canandaigua and the modern-day intersection of Lake Shore and Eastern Boulevard in Hopewell. US 20 and NY 5 were moved from Lake Shore Drive to the new highway upon completion. The remainder of the bypass around the southwestern extents of the city was built in the late 1970s and early 1980s.

In Canandaigua, the former routing of US 20 on South Main Street remains state maintained as NY 942T; until 1996, the portion of West Avenue between the west end of the bypass and the Canandaigua city line (also old US 20) was also maintained by NYSDOT as NY 942W. Even though maintenance of the road was transferred to the town of Canandaigua on September 1, 1996, the designation remained in NYSDOT documents until 2007. In Hamburg, the section of old US 20 between Athol Springs and Big Tree that did not become part of NY 5 c. 1932 is now CR 576 from NY 5 to Bayview Road and NY 951E, an unsigned reference route, from US 62 to US 20A.

In Geneva, US 20 was initially routed on East North Street and Border City Road, overlapping with NY 14 through the city and rejoining its modern routing in East Geneva. The overlap was eliminated c. 1931 when US 20 was moved onto a new roadway located along the edge of Seneca Lake. US 20 was realigned again in the 1960s to use a new divided highway built midway between the lake shore road and Border City Road. Border City Road is now maintained by Seneca County as CR 110.

=== Construction and legacy ===
Signage for the Route 20 Scenic Byway

While most of US 20 was constructed in the early 20th century as part of the legislative route system, many sections of the highway were left unimproved or unbuilt until well into the 1930s. Two substantial sections of the route—from Alexander (NY 98) to Avon and from Auburn to Cazenovia—were unimproved or unbuilt as late as 1926. The portion from Auburn to Skaneateles was brought up to state highway standards c. 1930 while the section connecting LaFayette (US 11) to Pompey (NY 91) was built by the following year. The last section of the Skaneateles–Cazenovia segment to open was the piece between Pompey and Cazenovia, which opened to traffic in mid-September 1934. Meanwhile, the highway was brought up to standards from Alexander to Bethany c. 1934, from Bethany to Pavilion (NY 19) c. 1935, between Pavilion and NY 36 c. 1936, and from NY 36 to Avon c. 1937.

The now-complete US 20 was the major thoroughfare across New York for several decades. During the early days, there were no motels around and only major cities—such as Auburn and Albany—had hotels. Around the late 1940s, automobiles became much more reliable and US 20 grew into a strong touring road. The road was one of the most traveled up until the New York State Thruway was created in the 1950s. Much of traffic and progress along US 20 were halted as a result. The 372-mile (599 km) US 20 is lined with historical places, including Sharon Springs, Cherry Valley, Bouckville, Cazenovia, Skaneateles, Auburn, Geneva, and East Aurora. The length of US 20 from LaFayette to Duanesburg was designated as a 108-mile (174 km) New York State Scenic Byway on August 10, 2005.

== Major intersections ==
County	Location	mi	km	Destinations	Notes
Chautauqua	Town of Ripley	0.00	0.00	US 20 west – North East	Continuation into Pennsylvania
Chautauqua	Town of Ripley	1.42	2.29	To I-90 / New York Thruway	Access via NY 950D
Chautauqua	Town of Ripley	3.11	5.01	NY 76 – Sherman	Hamlet of Ripley
Chautauqua	Village of Westfield	11.01	17.72	NY 394 to I-90 / New York Thruway	
Chautauqua	Fredonia	27.59	44.40	NY 60 to I-90 / New York Thruway / NY 5 – Dunkirk, Jamestown	
Chautauqua	Sheridan	29.66	47.73	NY 39 east – Forestville	Western terminus of NY 39
Chautauqua	Silver Creek	38.63	62.17	NY 5 west / US 20 Truck east	Western terminus of NY 5 concurrency; western terminus of US 20 Truck
Chautauqua	Hanover	40.58	65.31	To I-90 / New York Thruway	Hamlet of Irving
Erie	Brant	41.51	66.80	NY 5 east / NY 438 east	Roundabout; eastern terminus of NY 5 concurrency; eastern terminus of NY 438
Erie	Brant	44.02	70.84	NY 249	
Erie	Town of Hamburg	59.36	95.53	NY 75 to I-90 / New York Thruway – Buffalo, Hamburg	
Erie	Town of Hamburg	61.18	98.46	US 62 to I-90 / New York Thruway – Buffalo, Hamburg, Fairgrounds	
Erie	Town of Hamburg	61.96	99.71	US 20A east (Big Tree Road)	Western terminus of US 20A; hamlet of Big Tree
Erie	Town of Orchard Park	64.96	104.54	NY 179 west / CR 460 east (Mile Strip Road)	Eastern terminus of NY 179; western terminus of CR 460
Erie	Town of Orchard Park	65.65	105.65	NY 240 / NY 277 (Orchard Park Road) / Lake Avenue	
Erie	West Seneca	68.85	110.80	NY 187 south (Transit Road)	Northern terminus of NY 187
Erie	West Seneca–Elma line	69.75	112.25	NY 16 / NY 78 south (Seneca Street)	Western terminus of NY 78 concurrency
Erie	West Seneca–Elma line	70.25	113.06	NY 400 – East Aurora, Buffalo	Interchange
Erie	West Seneca–Elma line	72.04	115.94	NY 354 (Clinton Street)	
Erie	Depew	74.94	120.60	NY 78 north (Transit Road) / NY 130 west (Broadway) – Amtrak	Eastern terminus of NY 78 concurrency; eastern terminus of NY 130
Genesee	Town of Darien	90.85	146.21	NY 77 to I-90 / New York Thruway – Corfu	Hamlet of Darien Center
Genesee	Town of Darien	92.80	149.35	NY 238 south – Attica	Northern terminus of NY 238; hamlet of Darien
Genesee	Town of Alexander	97.77	157.35	NY 98 to I-90 / New York Thruway – Alexander, Attica, Batavia	Partial cloverleaf interchange
Genesee	Pavilion	107.53	173.05	NY 63 to I-90 / New York Thruway – Pavilion, Batavia	
Genesee	Pavilion	109.80	176.71	NY 19 to I-90 / New York Thruway – Pavilion, LeRoy	Partial cloverleaf interchange
Livingston	Town of York	116.92	188.16	NY 36 (Main Street)	
Livingston	Town of Caledonia	122.90	197.79	NY 5 west – Caledonia, Mumford	Western terminus of NY 5 concurrency
Livingston	Village of Avon	123.80	199.24	NY 39 west – Geneseo	Eastern terminus of NY 39
Livingston	Town of Avon	126.07	202.89	NY 15	Hamlet of East Avon
Livingston	Town of Avon	126.68	203.87	I-390 – Rochester, Corning	Exit 10 (I-390)
Livingston	Village of Lima	131.04	210.89	NY 15A (Lake Avenue)	
Ontario	West Bloomfield	134.85	217.02	NY 65 north / CR 37 south	Southern terminus of NY 65
Ontario	East Bloomfield	139.72	224.86	NY 64 north – Mendon	Western terminus of NY 64 concurrency
Ontario	East Bloomfield	141.53	227.77	NY 444 north – Downtown Bloomfield	Southern terminus of NY 444
Ontario	East Bloomfield	142.79	229.80	US 20A west / NY 64 south – Naples	Eastern terminus of NY 64 concurrency; eastern terminus of US 20A
Ontario	Town of Canandaigua	147.60	237.54	NY 21 south – Naples	Western terminus of NY 21 concurrency
Ontario	City of Canandaigua	149.23	240.16	NY 21 north / NY 332 north / South Main Street (NY 942T) – Business District, Resort Area	Eastern terminus of NY 21 concurrency; southern terminus of NY 332; NY 942T is former routing of US 20
Ontario	Town of Canandaigua	150.47	242.16	NY 364 south – Resort Area, CMAC	Northern terminus of NY 364
Ontario	Hopewell	152.53	245.47	NY 247 south – CMAC	Northern terminus of NY 247
Ontario	Town of Geneva	162.83	262.05	NY 14A south / NY 245 south – Penn Yan, Naples	Northern terminus of NY 245 and NY 14A
Ontario	City of Geneva	164.45	264.66	NY 14 / NY 14 Truck south – Watkins Glen	Partial cloverleaf interchange; western terminus of NY 14 Truck concurrency
Ontario	City of Geneva			NY 14 Truck north (Lake Street) – Geneva	Eastern terminus of NY 14 Truck concurrency
Seneca	Town of Waterloo	167.08	268.89	NY 96A south / Sessler Drive – Ovid, Ithaca	Hamlet of East Geneva; northern terminus of NY 96A
Seneca	Village of Waterloo	171.78	276.45	NY 96	
Seneca	Town of Seneca Falls	173.21	278.75	NY 414 north to I-90 / New York Thruway – Clyde	Western terminus of NY 414 concurrency
Seneca	Town of Seneca Falls	175.43	282.33	NY 414 south (Ovid Street)	Eastern terminus of NY 414 concurrency; hamlet of Seneca Falls
Seneca	Town of Seneca Falls	178.48	287.24	NY 318 west to I-90 / New York Thruway – Del Lago	Eastern terminus of NY 318
Seneca	Seneca Falls–Tyre town line	178.58	287.40	NY 89 – Ithaca, Savannah	
Cayuga	Montezuma	180.53	290.53	NY 90 – Montezuma, Cayuga	
Cayuga	Aurelius	188.63	303.57	NY 326 west – Union Springs	Eastern terminus of NY 326
Cayuga	Auburn	190.01	305.79	NY 38 north (State Street) – Port Byron, Auburn Correctional Facility	Western terminus of NY 38 concurrency
Cayuga	Auburn	190.18	306.07	NY 34 south / NY 38 to I-90 / New York Thruway – Weedsport, Ithaca, Moravia	Eastern terminus of NY 38 concurrency
Cayuga	Auburn	190.47	306.53	NY 5 east / NY 38A – Weedsport	Eastern terminus of NY 5 concurrency; northern terminus of NY 38A
Cayuga	Auburn	190.58	306.71	NY 38A south – Owasco	Eastern terminus of NY 38A concurrency
Onondaga	Village of Skaneateles	196.97	316.99	NY 41A south (Kane Avenue)	Northern terminus of NY 41A
Onondaga	Village of Skaneateles	197.44	317.75	NY 321 north – Camillus	Southern terminus of NY 321
Onondaga	Village of Skaneateles	198.08	318.78	NY 41 south – Homer, Cortland	Northern terminus of NY 41
Onondaga	Town of Skaneateles	199.27	320.69	NY 175 east – Marcellus, Syracuse	Western terminus of NY 175
Onondaga	Town of Marcellus	202.45	325.81	NY 174 south – Otisco Lake	Western terminus of NY 174 concurrency
Onondaga	Town of Marcellus	202.78	326.34	NY 174 north – Marcellus	Eastern terminus of NY 174 concurrency
Onondaga	Onondaga	208.60	335.71	NY 80 (Lords Hill Road)	
Onondaga	LaFayette	212.80	342.47	To NY 11A – Cardiff	Access via Field Lane; hamlet of Cardiff
Onondaga	LaFayette	214.46	345.14	I-81 south – Binghamton	Exit 73 (I-81)
Onondaga	LaFayette	214.78	345.65	US 11 to I-81 north – Syracuse	
Onondaga	Pompey	220.74	355.25	NY 91 – Jamesville, Fabius	
Madison	Town of Cazenovia	229.20	368.86	NY 92 west (Syracuse Road) – Manlius, Syracuse	Eastern terminus of NY 92
Madison	Village of Cazenovia	229.87	369.94	NY 13 south (Rippleton Road) – DeRuyter	Western terminus of NY 13 concurrency
Madison	Village of Cazenovia	230.46	370.89	NY 13 north (Farnham Street) to I-90 / New York Thruway – Chittenango	Eastern terminus of NY 13 concurrency
Madison	Eaton	245.02	394.32	NY 46 north (Bear Path Road) – Munnsville, Oneida	Western terminus of NY 46 concurrency
Madison	Eaton	245.23	394.66	NY 46 south – Hamilton	Eastern terminus of NY 46 concurrency
Madison	Eaton	245.79	395.56	NY 26 south (Fargo Road) – Georgetown	Western terminus of NY 26 concurrency
Madison	Town of Madison	247.44	398.22	NY 12B south – Hamilton	Western terminus of NY 12B concurrency
Madison	Town of Madison	250.44	403.04	NY 12B north / NY 26 north – Oriskany Falls	Eastern terminus of NY 12B / NY 26 concurrency
Oneida	Sangerfield	255.89	411.82	NY 12 – Sherburne, Waterville, Utica	
Oneida	Bridgewater	263.51	424.08	NY 8 to I-90 / New York Thruway – Leonardsville, Clayville, Utica	Hamlet of Bridgewater
Otsego	Plainfield			CR 18 south – Unadilla Forks	Former northern terminus of NY 413
Herkimer	No major junctions				
Oneida	No major junctions				
Herkimer	West Winfield	266.63	429.10	NY 51 south (South Street)	Western terminus of NY 51 concurrency
Herkimer	Town of Winfield	269.47	433.67	NY 51 north – Ilion	Eastern terminus of NY 51 concurrency
Otsego	Richfield	276.90	445.63	NY 28 north to I-90 / New York Thruway – Mohawk	Western terminus of NY 28 concurrency
Otsego	Richfield Springs	277.36	446.37	NY 28 south (Prospect Street) to I-88 – Cooperstown	Eastern terminus of concurrency NY 28
Otsego	Richfield Springs	277.77	447.03	NY 167 north (Church Street) – Little Falls	Southern terminus of NY 167
Herkimer	No major junctions				
Otsego	Springfield	283.78	456.70	NY 80 – Cooperstown, Fort Plain	Hamlet of Springfield Center
Otsego	Springfield			CR 31 – Glimmerglass State Park	
Otsego	Town of Cherry Valley	290.98	468.29	NY 166 south – Cherry Valley	Partial cloverleaf interchange; northern terminus of NY 166
Schoharie	Sharon Springs	297.37	478.57	NY 10 (Main Street / France Street) to I-90 / New York Thruway / I-88 – Canajoharie, Richmondville	
Schoharie	Sharon	302.35	486.59	NY 145 south – Cobleskill	Northern terminus of NY 145
Schoharie	Town of Esperance	312.65	503.16	NY 30A / NY 162 north to I-90 / New York Thruway / I-88 – Fultonville, Central Bridge, Fonda	Southern terminus of NY 162; hamlet of Sloansville
Schenectady	Duanesburg	317.01	510.18	NY 30 to I-90 / New York Thruway / I-88 – Amsterdam, Schoharie	
Schenectady	Duanesburg	320.18	515.28	NY 395 south – Delanson	Northern terminus of NY 395
Schenectady	Duanesburg	322.88	519.62	NY 7 – Schenectady, Cobleskill	Hamlet of Duanesburg
Schenectady	Duanesburg	323.95	521.35	To I-88 / New York Thruway (I-90) – Albany, Binghamton	
Schenectady	Princetown	327.30	526.74	NY 406 east (Gifford Church Road) – Schenectady	Western terminus of NY 406
Albany	Town of Guilderland	329.23	529.84	NY 397 south (Dunnsville Road) – Altamont	Northern terminus of NY 397
Albany	Town of Guilderland	330.73	532.26	NY 158 – Altamont, Schenectady	
Albany	Town of Guilderland	333.81	537.22	NY 146 east (Carman Road) to I-90 / New York Thruway / I-890 – Schenectady	Western terminus of concurrency with NY 146
Albany	Town of Guilderland	334.49	538.31	NY 146 west – Altamont	Eastern terminus of concurrency with NY 146
Albany	Town of Guilderland	336.40	541.38	NY 155 (State Farm Road / New Karner Road) – Voorheesville, Colonie	Hamlet of Westmere
Albany	Town of Guilderland	338.88	545.37	To I-87 / I-90 / New York Thruway	Access via NY 910F; hamlet of McKownville
Albany	Albany			To NY 85 west (Crosstown Arterial)	Access via Daytona Avenue
Albany	Albany			To NY 85 east (Crosstown Arterial)	Access via Ormond Street
Albany	Albany	343.34	552.55	US 9W / NY 443 west (Lark Street / Delaware Avenue)	Eastern terminus of NY 443
Albany	Albany	344.04	553.68	Grand Street (NY 912G north)	Southern terminus of unsigned NY 912G
Albany	Albany	344.14	553.84	NY 32 south (South Pearl Street) to I-87 / New York Thruway / I-787	Southern terminus of concurrency with NY 32
Albany	Albany	344.22– 344.41	553.97– 554.27	NY 32 north (South Pearl Street)	Northern terminus of concurrency with NY 32
Albany	Albany	344.22– 344.41	553.97– 554.27	Empire Plaza	Interchange; access via South Mall Arterial; no westbound entrance
Albany	Albany	344.58	554.55	I-787 / US 9 north to I-87 / New York Thruway – Troy	Western terminus of concurrency with US 9; exits 3A-4B (I-787)
Hudson River				Dunn Memorial Bridge	
Rensselaer	Rensselaer	345.17	555.50	NY 151 east – 3rd Avenue Extension, Broadway, Albany–Rensselaer station	
Rensselaer	Rensselaer	345.75	556.43	NY 9J south – Castleton	Interchange; northern terminus of NY 9J
Rensselaer	Town of East Greenbush	348.54	560.92	US 4 north – Troy	Southern terminus of US 4; hamlet of East Greenbush
Rensselaer	Town of Schodack	350.35	563.83	To I-90	Access via NY 912F
Rensselaer	Town of Schodack	351.72	566.04	I-90 – Albany, Boston	Exit 11 (I-90)
Rensselaer	Town of Schodack	352.23	566.86	NY 150 – Castleton, East Schodack, West Sand Lake	Hamlet of Schodack Center
Rensselaer	Town of Schodack	352.60	567.45	US 9 south – Hudson	Eastern terminus of concurrency with US 9
Rensselaer	Village of Nassau	356.71	574.07	NY 203 south – Chatham	Northern terminus of NY 203
Rensselaer	Town of Nassau	361.17	581.25	NY 66 south – Chatham	Western terminus of concurrency with NY 66
Rensselaer	East Nassau	362.92	584.06	NY 66 north – East Nassau, Averill Park	Eastern terminus of concurrency with NY 66
Columbia	New Lebanon	369.58	594.78	NY 22 south to I-90 / Berkshire Connector – Austerlitz	Western terminus of concurrency with NY 22; hamlet of New Lebanon
Columbia	New Lebanon	370.32	595.97	NY 22 north – Lebanon Springs	Eastern terminus of concurrency with NY 22; hamlet of Lebanon Springs
Columbia	New Lebanon	372.32	599.19	US 20 east – Pittsfield	Continuation into Massachusetts
1.000 mi = 1.609 km; 1.000 km = 0.621 mi: Concurrency terminus; Electronic toll collection

== Suffixed routes ==
US 20 has had seven suffixed routes in New York; one U.S. Highway (US 20A) and six New York state routes. All six state routes have been removed or redesignated; US 20A, however, still exists.

- US 20A (83.59 mi or 134.53 km) is an alternate route of US 20 between Hamburg, Erie County, and East Bloomfield, Ontario County. It was assigned c. 1939.
- The NY 20A designation has been used for two distinct highways:
  - The first NY 20A was an alternate route of US 20 between the Pennsylvania state line at Ripley and Silver Creek in Chautauqua County. It was assigned as part of the 1930 state highway renumbering and supplanted by NY 5 c. 1932.
  - The second NY 20A was a short-lived alternate route of US 20 between Hamburg and Avon. It was assigned c. 1938 and largely replaced by US 20A by the following year.
- NY 20B was an alternate route of US 20 between Irving and Orchard Park in Erie County. It was assigned as part of the 1930 renumbering and supplanted by a realigned US 20 c. 1932.
- NY 20C was a loop route connecting US 20 to the then-village of Holcomb (now part of Bloomfield) in Ontario County. The route was assigned c. 1931 and partially replaced by NY 444 in 1997.
- NY 20D was a connector between then-US 20 in Geneseo and NY 5 in Avon. It was assigned c. 1931 and supplanted by NY 20A c. 1938. The route is now the northeasternmost portion of NY 39.
- NY 20N was an alternate route of US 20 between Marcellus, Onondaga County, and Cazenovia, Madison County. The route overlapped other, preexisting routes for its entire length. It was assigned c. 1938 and removed c. 1962, leaving just the routes it overlapped.
- NY 20SY was an alternate route of US 20 between Skaneateles and Cazenovia in Onondaga and Madison counties. Like NY 20N, NY 20SY was concurrent with other, preexisting routes for most of its length. It was assigned in the early 1950s and removed c. 1962, leaving just the routes it overlapped.

=== US 20 Truck ===
U.S. Route 20 Truck
- Location: Silver Creek

U.S. Route 20 Truck (US 20 Truck) is a short truck route of US 20 in Silver Creek. The road begins at an intersection with US 20 in Silver Creek, goes along Central Avenue for 0.05 miles (0.080 km) as NY 952H and merges in with NY 5. The two become concurrent for another mile (1.6 km) on Howard Street where US 20 Truck ends at an intersection with US 20.

In the village of Silver Creek, commercial truck traffic is not allowed to use US 20 east unless said traffic is making deliveries to local businesses in either the village or the South Dayton, Perrysburg, and Cherry Creek areas southeast of Silver Creek. All other commercial truck traffic per New York state vehicle and traffic laws must use US 20 Truck through the village.

== See also ==
- List of county routes in Seneca County, New York

U.S. Route 20
Previous state: Pennsylvania	New York	Next state: Massachusetts
