= Princetown, New York =

- Town
- Location in Schenectady County and the state of New York.
- Coordinates: 42°47′59″N 74°4′38″W
- Country: United States
- State: New York
- County: Schenectady

Government
  - Type: Town board
  - Supervisor: Louis Esposito (R)

Area
  - Total: 24.21 sq mi (62.71 km^{2})
  - Land: 23.93 sq mi (61.97 km^{2})
  - Water: 0.29 sq mi (0.74 km^{2})
- Elevation: 1,053 ft (321 m)

Population (2020)
  - Total: 2,024
  - Estimate (2016): 2,105
  - Density: 84.59/sq mi (32.66/km^{2})
- Time zone: UTC-5 (Eastern (EST))
  - Summer (DST): UTC-4 (EDT)
- ZIP code: 12056
- Area code: 518
- FIPS code: 36-59861
- GNIS feature ID: 0979399
- Website: www.princetown.net

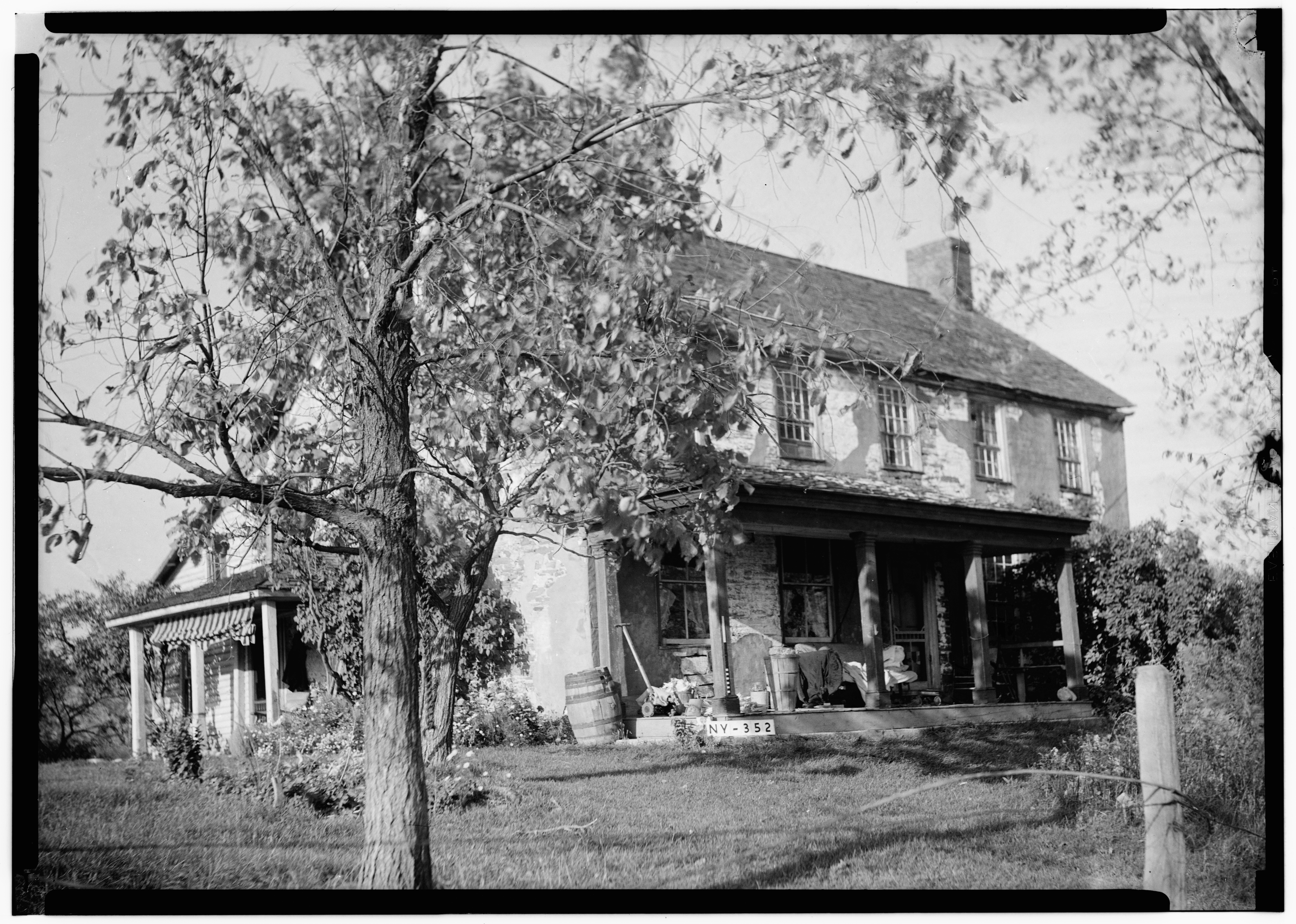
Liddle House - the oldest extant house in Princetown, built c. 1790

Princetown is a town in Schenectady County, New York, United States. The population was 2,024 at the 2020 census. It is in the central part of the county, west of the town of Rotterdam.

== History ==
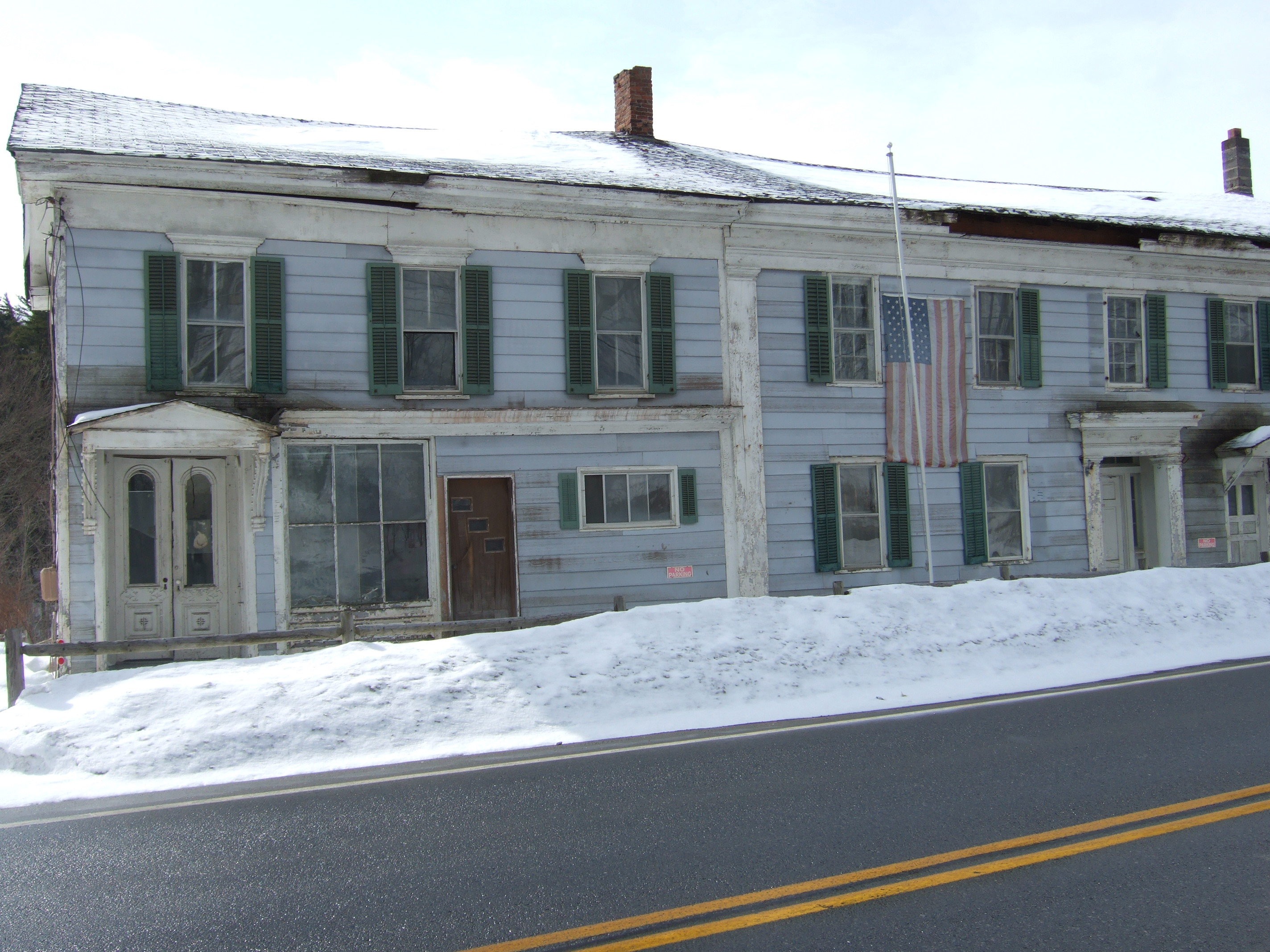
Old store and post office, Kelly's Station

The town of Princetown was established in 1798 by the New York State Legislature, combining lands formerly known as Corry's Bush and land belonging to the Dutch Reformed Church in Schenectady. It was named for John Prince, a New York State assemblyman from Albany County who lived in Schenectady proper at the time. Many of the early settlers of the town were from Scotland, and for almost all of its history, the town has been rural with an economy based in agriculture. Today the town is mostly a mix of farming and exurban development with a little light industry.

In the past, the town had seven one-room schools. The Princetown Academy and Female Seminary, established in 1853, was an educational institution sponsored by the local Presbyterian Church. Although it attracted a substantial student body—exceeding 400 students by 1854, including individuals from Cuba, Germany, and Scotland—it primarily served the surrounding region. The institution ceased operations in 1856 due to financial mismanagement. The Academy was located in the former hamlet of Princetown (Center).

In the south end of the town was Cheeseman's Tavern (c. 1784) located in the hamlet of Gifford's (Corners). Its owner, Joshua Cheeseman, was for a few years, a regionally well-known shinplaster banker, producing a number of paper notes used across the region.

In the north end of the town, on the border with Duanesburg, was the location of the estate of George William Featherstonaugh, which was the subject of several Thomas Cole paintings. Featherstonaugh was an English-American geographer and geologist also especially interested in the use of rail transportation to modernize farming.

== Geography ==
The north town line is the border of Montgomery County, and the south town line is the border of Albany County. The town of Rotterdam is to the east, and the town of Duanesburg is to the west. The center of Princetown is 7 miles (11 km) west of downtown Schenectady.

According to the United States Census Bureau, the town has a total area of 24.2 square miles (62.7 km^{2}), of which 23.9 square miles (62.0 km^{2}) is land and 0.27 square miles (0.7 km^{2}), or 1.18%, is water.

== Demographics ==
Historical population
Census	Pop.	Note	%±
1820	1,075		—
1830	819		−23.8%
1840	1,201		46.6%
1850	1,031		−14.2%
1860	996		−3.4%
1870	846		−15.1%
1880	826		−2.4%
1890	732		−11.4%
1900	694		−5.2%
1910	684		−1.4%
1920	487		−28.8%
1930	472		−3.1%
1940	553		17.2%
1950	774		40.0%
1960	912		17.8%
1970	1,405		54.1%
1980	1,804		28.4%
1990	2,031		12.6%
2000	2,132		5.0%
2010	2,115		−0.8%
2020	2,024		−4.3%
U.S. Decennial Census

In the 2000 census, there were 2,132 people, 797 households, and 611 families residing in the town. The population density was 88.7 inhabitants per square mile (34.2/km^{2}). There were 835 housing units at an average density of 34.7 per square mile (13.4/km^{2}). The racial makeup of the town was 98.69% White, 0.19% African American, 0.19% Native American, 0.19% Asian, 0.09% Pacific Islander, 0.19% from other races, and 0.47% from two or more races. Hispanic or Latino of any race were 0.66% of the population.

There were 797 households, out of which 33.6% had children under the age of 18 living with them, 65.9% were married couples living together, 7.3% had a female householder with no husband present, and 23.3% were non-families. 17.7% of all households were made up of individuals, and 5.5% had someone living alone who was 65 years of age or older. The average household size was 2.68 and the average family size was 3.05.

According to demographic data, the population of the town was distributed with 25.1% under the age of 18, 5.8% between 18 and 24, 28.5% from 25 to 44, 28.8% from 45 to 64, and 11.8% aged 65 or older. The median age was 41 years. The gender ratio was 105.8 males for every 100 females, and among individuals aged 18 and over, there were 102.2 males for every 100 females.

The median income for a household in the town was $57,250, and the median income for a family was $63,077. Males had a median income of $45,750 versus $28,362 for females. The per capita income for the town was $24,292. About 1.6% of families and 3.3% of the population were below the poverty line, including 5.3% of those under age 18 and 3.6% of those age 65 or over.

== Communities and locations in Princetown ==
- Bradshaw's Corners - an area where North Kelly and Weast Roads meet at Mariaville Road (NY 159).
- Gifford's (Corners) - a small hamlet in the south part of the town located at the intersection of New York State route 406 and U.S. Route 20. It was once home to Cheeseman's Tavern, the owner of which was known as a "shinplaster" banker.
- Kelly's Station - A small hamlet in the southeast part of the town; it was home to a train station for the Schenectady and Duanesburg Railroad, (a line now operated by the Delaware and Hudson Railway) a store and post office. It is also known for a set of double culverts that were built to carry the railroad over Kelly Station Road and the Bonny Kill or Bonny Brook.
- Mariaville (Lake) - A hamlet and CDP on the border between the town and the town of Duanesburg toward the northern end of the town.
- Pattersonville – A hamlet and part of a CDP (Census Designated Place) partly in the northern part of the town.
- Princetown (center) – A hamlet often mistakenly considered to be in the southern part of the town, this area was actually known as Princetown P.O. until the arrival of the Schenectady and Duanesburg Railroad (owned by the Delaware and Hudson Railroad) in 1873. After that time it was known as Kelly's Station. There was, however, a hamlet located in the center of the town known as Princetown, or Princetown Center which developed around the second Presbyterian Church in the town at corner of present-day Currybush and North Kelly roads. This hamlet was also home to the Princetown Academy and Female Seminary from 1853 to 1856.
- Rynex Corners - A hamlet in the northern part of the town on the border between Princetown and the town of Rotterdam. It once contained a hotel and cheese factory.
- Willow Run - a modern subdivision in the middle of the town north of the D&H railway line.

== Notable people ==
- George William Featherstonaugh, an English-American geologist and geographer who once owned a large estate on the border between Duanesburg and Princetown. The estate was the subject of several Thomas Cole paintings.
- Nelson Fryer, Wisconsin State Assembly member and farmer, was born in Princetown.
