= New York State Route 147 =

Highway in New York

New York State Route 147
- Map of the Capital District in New York with NY 147 highlighted in red

Route information
- Maintained by NYSDOT
- Length: 17.14 mi (27.58 km)
- Existed: 1930–present

Major junctions
- South end: NY 5 in Scotia
- North end: NY 29 in Galway

Location
- Country: United States
- State: New York
- Counties: Schenectady, Saratoga

Highway system
- New York Highways; Interstate; US; State; Reference; Parkways
← NY 146C	→ NY 148

New York State Route 147 (NY 147) is a north–south state highway in the Capital District of New York in the United States. The southern terminus of the route is at an intersection with NY 5 west of Schenectady in the village of Scotia. Its northern terminus is at a junction with NY 29 in the town of Galway. NY 147 intersects NY 67 in the town of Charlton and serves mainly as a connector between the Schenectady area and the region surrounding Great Sacandaga Lake.

== Route description ==
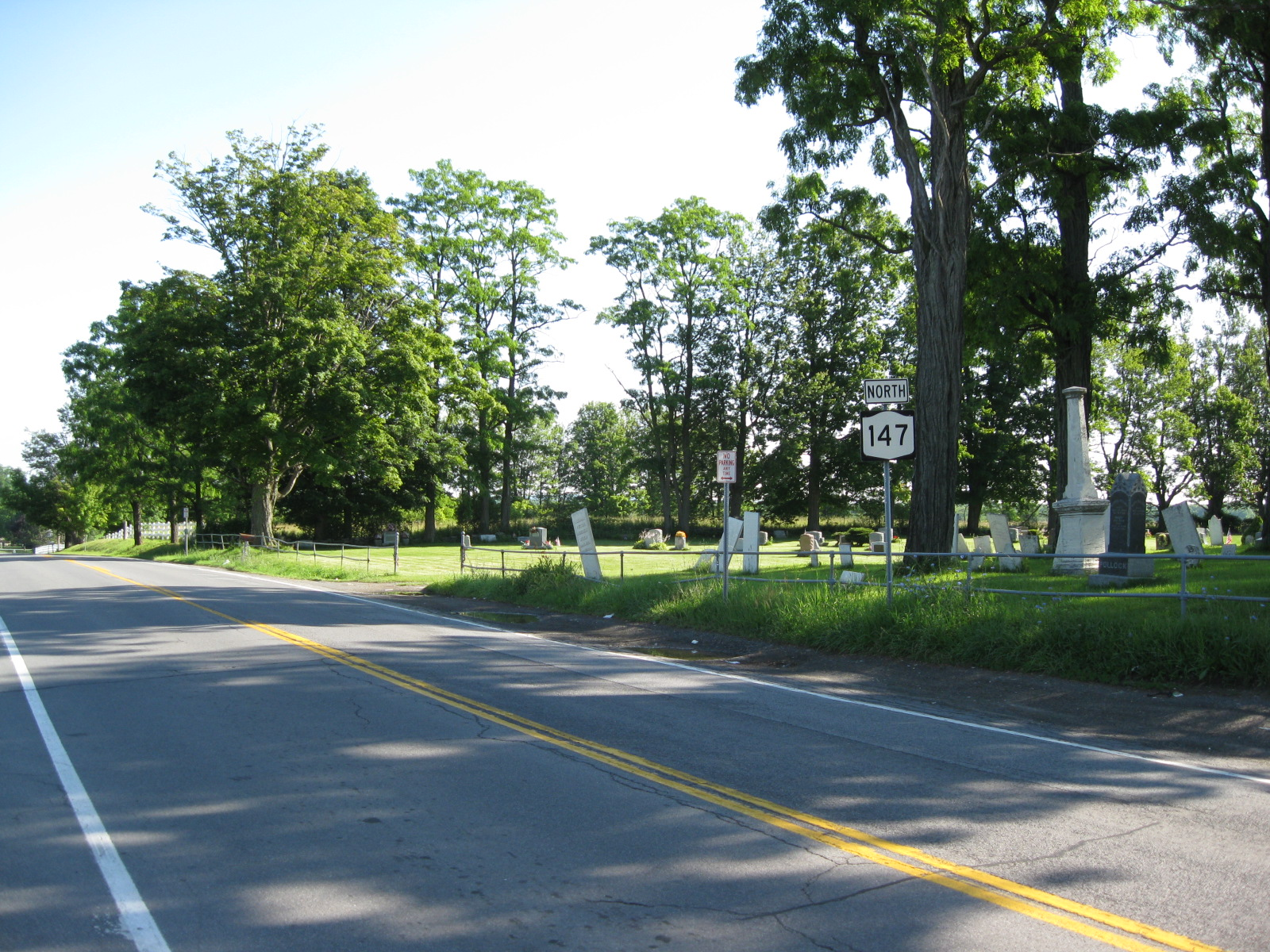
NY 147 crossing to the west of Maple Shade Cemetery in Scotia

NY 147 begins at an intersection with NY 5 (Mohawk Avenue) in the Schenectady County village of Scotia. NY 147 proceeds northeastward as Scandaga Road, a two-lane commercial street past Maple Shade Cemetery and crossing over an Amtrak line. After crossing the tracks, the route enters the town of Glenville, where it connects to County Route 30 (CR 30; Vley Road), which does not directly intersect with NY 147. NY 147 crosses over another railroad line, intersecting with the terminus of CR 47 (Spring Road). After ascending up a hill, NY 147 intersects with CR 49 (Ridge Road). The route remains a residential two-lane highway, entering the hamlets of Harding Crossing and Beukendaal, at which point, intersects with CR 32 (Snake Hill Road). Curving northward into the hamlet of Glenville Center, NY 147 intersects with CR 34 (Bolt Road) and CR 36 (Church Road) before leaving the hamlet. The route remains primarily residential, bending to the northwest a distance from the Saratoga County line. NY 147 enters the hamlet of Lower Corners, where it intersects with the terminus of CR 40 (West Glenville Road). Just north of Lowers Corners, NY 147 intersects with Charlton Road (a continuation of CR 51 in Saratoga County) before NY 147 does as well.

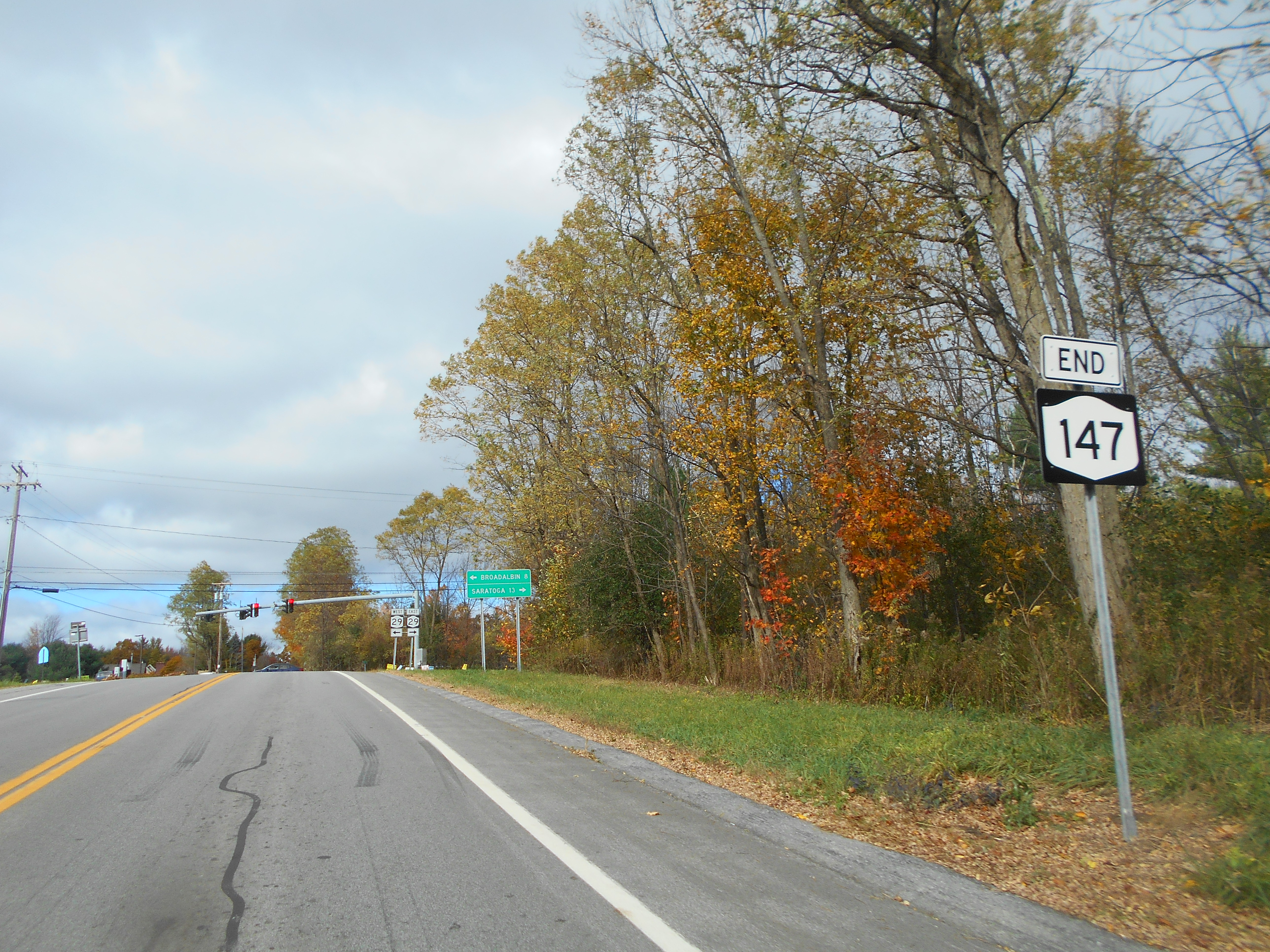
NY 147 approaching NY 29 in Galway

After crossing into Saratoga County, NY 147 intersects with CR 55 (North Road) in the town of Charlton. The backdrop becomes rural, entering the hamlet of West Charlton, a small residential part of Charlton. North of West Charlton, NY 147 intersects with NY 67 (Amsterdam Road) then crosses into the town of Galway. The road remains rural, passing through the village of Galway, crossing CR 45 (West Street / East Street) in the middle of Galway. NY 147 bends to the northeast out of downtown and continues northward as a two-lane rural highway through Galway, bending northwestward into the hamlet of Kimball Corners. In Kimball Corners, NY 147 intersects with NY 29, which is where the NY 147 designation terminates. The right-of-way continues north as Dean Lung Road.

== History ==
In 1912, the New York State Legislature created Route 37-a, an unsigned legislative route extending from Route 25 (now NY 50) in the village of Ballston Spa to Route 37 (modern NY 29) in the town of Galway by way of Scotch Church and the village of Galway. The portion of Route 37-a between Scotch Church and NY 29 north of Galway village became the northern half of NY 147, a new route extending from Scotia to Galway, as part of the 1930 renumbering of state highways in New York. NY 147 has remained unchanged since that time.

== Major intersections ==
County	Location	mi	km	Destinations	Notes
Schenectady	Scotia	0.00	0.00	NY 5 (Mohawk Avenue)	Southern terminus
Saratoga	Charlton	11.22	18.06	NY 67 – Amsterdam, Ballston Spa	
Saratoga	Town of Galway	17.14	27.58	NY 29 – Broadalbin, Saratoga	Northern terminus
1.000 mi = 1.609 km; 1.000 km = 0.621 mi
