= Gifford, New York =

Coordinates: 42°45′03″N 74°02′54″W

Gifford is a hamlet in Schenectady County, in the U.S. state of New York. A variant name was "Gifford's Corners".

== History ==
A post office called Gifford was established in 1881, and was discontinued in 1904. The community was named after J. Gifford, proprietor of a hotel.
