= Duanesburg (CDP), New York =

Duanesburg, New York
- Census-designated place
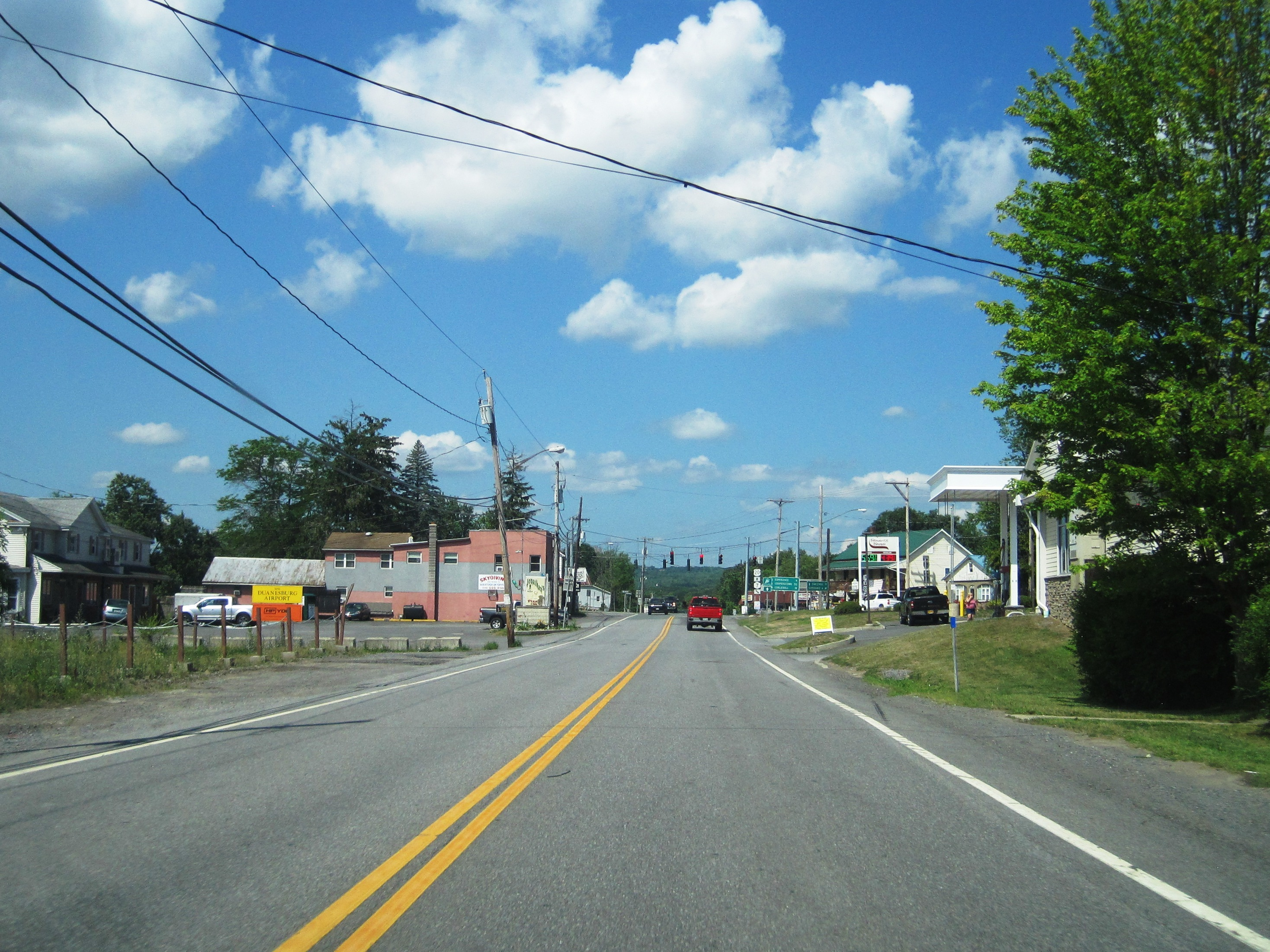
- Center of Duanesburg at US 20 and NY 7

- Location in Schenectady County and the state of New York.
- Coordinates: 42°45′43″N 74°7′45″W
- Country: United States
- State: New York
- County: Schenectady

Area
  - Total: 2.55 sq mi (6.60 km^{2})
  - Land: 2.45 sq mi (6.35 km^{2})
  - Water: 0.097 sq mi (0.25 km^{2})
- Elevation: 719 ft (219 m)

Population (2020)
  - Total: 379
  - Density: 154.5/sq mi (59.67/km^{2})
- Time zone: UTC-5 (Eastern (EST))
  - Summer (DST): UTC-4 (EDT)
- ZIP code: 12056
- Area code: 518
- FIPS code: 36-20995
- GNIS feature ID: 0948718

Duanesburg is a census-designated place within the town of Duanesburg in Schenectady County, New York, United States. The name of the CDP is the name of a hamlet in that region of the town. The town is named after James Duane, founder of the settlement. Duane served in the Continental Congress, as Mayor of New York City, and first federal judge of the district of New York. The census provides separate or additional population and demographic data for the more densely populated central settlement described by the CDP. The population was 391 at the 2010 census.

(For aggregate values and other information about the town as a whole, See: Duanesburg, New York. )

== Geography ==
According to the United States Census Bureau, the settlement consists of a total area of 2.5 square miles (6.6 km^{2}) within the town, of which 2.4 square miles (6.3 km^{2}) is land, and 0.077 square miles (0.2 km^{2}) (3.77%) is water.

== Demographics ==
Historical population
Census	Pop.	Note	%±
2020	379		—
U.S. Decennial Census

As of the census of 2000, there were 339 people, 153 households, and 93 families residing in the settlement. The population density was 132.2 inhabitants per square mile (51.0/km^{2}). There were 159 housing units at an average density of 23.9 inhabitants/km^{2} (62.0 inhabitants/mi^{2}). The racial makeup of the town was 98.23% White, 1.77% from other races. 3.54% of the population were Hispanic or Latino of any race.

There were 153 households, out of which 26.8% had children under the age of 18 living with them, 46.4% were married couples living together, 7.2% have a woman whose husband does not live with her, and 39.2% were non-families. 32.7% of all households were made up of individuals, and 11.8% had someone living alone who was 65 years of age or older. The average household size was 2.22 and the average family size was 2.80.

In the CDP, the population was spread out, with 20.6% under the age of 18, 7.4% from 18 to 24, 33.0% from 25 to 44, 28.9% from 45 to 64, and 10.0% who were 65 years of age or older. The median age was 38 years. For every 100 females, there were 93.7 males. For every 100 females age 18 and over, there were 99.3 males.

The median income for a household is $54,519, and the median income for a family was $59,844. Males had a median income of $40,278 versus $29,375 for females. The per capita income for the town was $28,088. None of the families and 1.7% of the population were below the poverty line. Out of the total people living in poverty, 0.0% are under the age of 18 and 0.0% are 65 or older.
