= New York State Route 159 =

State highway in Schenectady County, New York, US

New York State Route 159
- Mariaville Road
- NY 159 highlighted in red

Route information
- Maintained by NYSDOT
- Length: 13.52 mi (21.76 km)
- Existed: 1930–present

Major junctions
- West end: NY 30 in Duanesburg
- East end: NY 7 in Rotterdam

Location
- Country: United States
- State: New York
- Counties: Schenectady

Highway system
- New York Highways; Interstate; US; State; Reference; Parkways
| ← NY 158 | → NY 160 |

New York State Route 159 (NY 159) is a 13.52-mile-long (21.76 km) east–west state highway in New York, running from the town of Duanesburg through Mariaville Lake to the hamlet of Rotterdam, just outside the city of Schenectady. A two-lane highway for all of its length, it is entirely located in Schenectady County.

== Route description ==
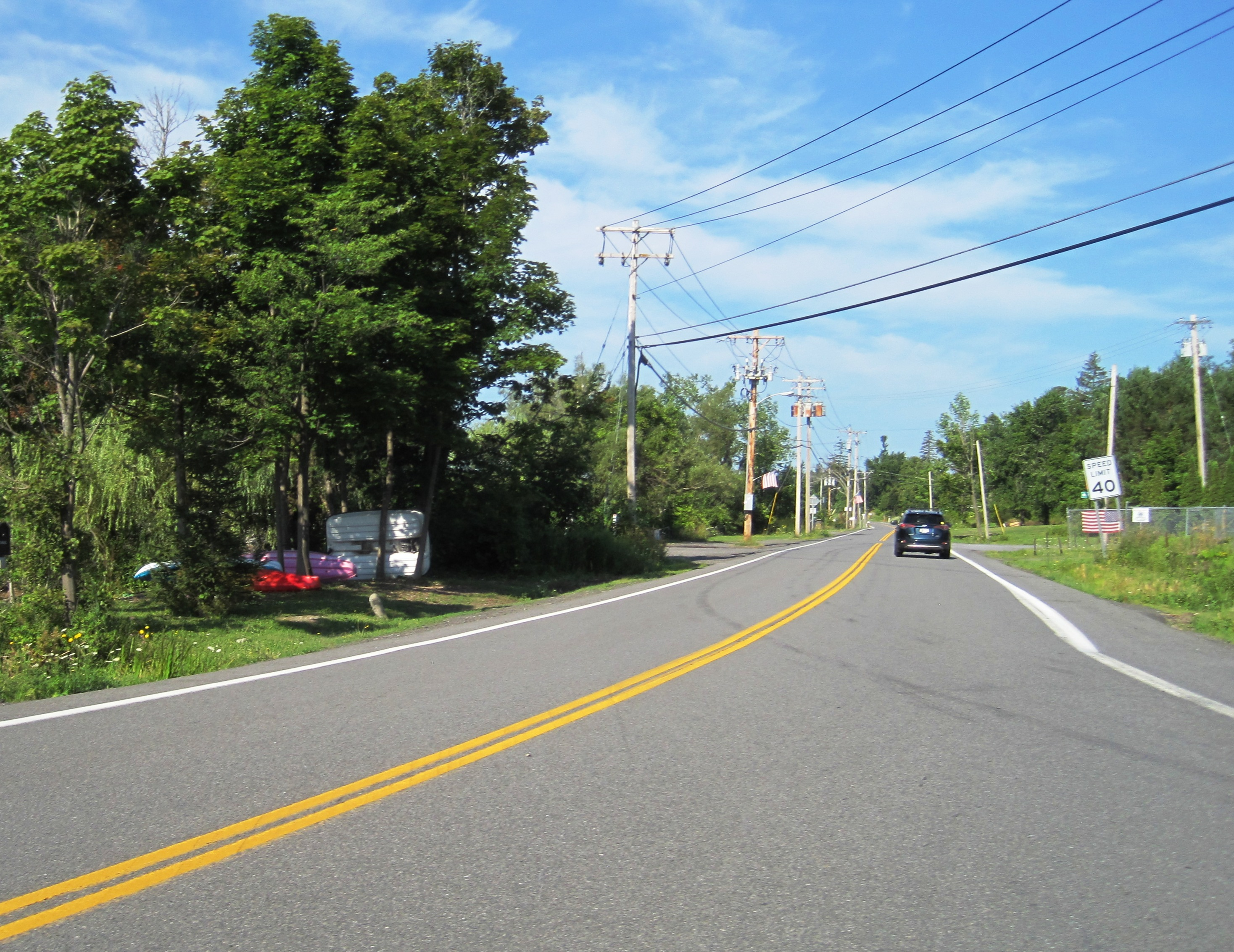
NY 159 westbound in Mariaville Lake

Known as Mariaville Road, NY 159 begins at NY 30 just south of the Montgomery County line. Three miles (4.8 km) in, it meets NY 160 at its southern terminus, turning right to meet Mariaville Lake. At a signal-controlled intersection with Batter Street, NY 159 turns a hard left to run along the lake's northern shore before turning a hard right to cross over the lake. After heading south for about a mile past the lake, NY 159 turns eastward. Three miles later, a long gentle curve toward a more southerly direction has it heading downhill until another turn takes it to its Thruway overpass.

From there, NY 159 is nearly straight and nearly eastward, crossing NY 337 in Rotterdam and ending at the complex intersection, locally known as the "Rotterdam Five Corners". Also at this intersection is Broadway for Schenectady, Princetown Road, Duanesburgh Road (NY 7 west), and Curry Road (NY 7 east).

== History ==
NY 159 was assigned to its current alignment as part of the 1930 renumbering of state highways in New York and has not had any major changes since.

== Major intersections ==
The entire route is in Schenectady County.

| Location | mi | km | Destinations | Notes |
|---|---|---|---|---|
| Town of Duanesburg | 0.00 | 0.00 | NY 30 – Esperance, Amsterdam | Western terminus |
| Town of Duanesburg | 3.20 | 5.15 | NY 160 north (Mariaville Scotch Church Road) – Pattersonville | Hamlet of Mariaville Lake; southern terminus of NY 160 |
| Rotterdam | 12.22 | 19.67 | NY 337 (Burdeck Road) | |
| Rotterdam | 13.52 | 21.76 | NY 7 (Curry Road / Duanesburg Road) | Eastern terminus; Rotterdam Five Corners |
1.000 mi = 1.609 km; 1.000 km = 0.621 mi
