= New York State Route 160 =

Highway in New York

New York State Route 160
- NY 160 highlighted in red, former routing west of Florida in grey

Route information
- Maintained by NYSDOT
- Length: 6.58 mi (10.59 km)
- Existed: 1930–present

Major junctions
- South end: NY 159 in Duanesburg
- North end: NY 5S in Rotterdam

Location
- Country: United States
- State: New York
- Counties: Schenectady, Montgomery

Highway system
- New York Highways; Interstate; US; State; Reference; Parkways
← NY 159	→ NY 161
← NY 406	NY 407	→ NY 408

New York State Route 160 (NY 160) is a 6.58-mile-long (10.59 km) north–south state highway mostly located within Schenectady County, New York, in the United States. The southern terminus of the route is at an intersection with NY 159 in the Duanesburg hamlet of Mariaville Lake. Its northern terminus is at a junction with NY 5S in the Rotterdam hamlet of Pattersonville. While its termini are both in Schenectady County, it briefly passes into Montgomery County near its midpoint.

Originally, NY 160 was little more than a loop route connecting NY 5S in Florida and Rotterdam to then-New York State Route 407 in Scotch Church when it was assigned in 1930. In 1981, NY 407, a connector between Mariaville Lake and Scotch Church, was replaced by a realigned NY 160 while NY 160's former routing through Florida was transferred to Montgomery County and redesignated as County Route 165 (CR 165).

== Route description ==
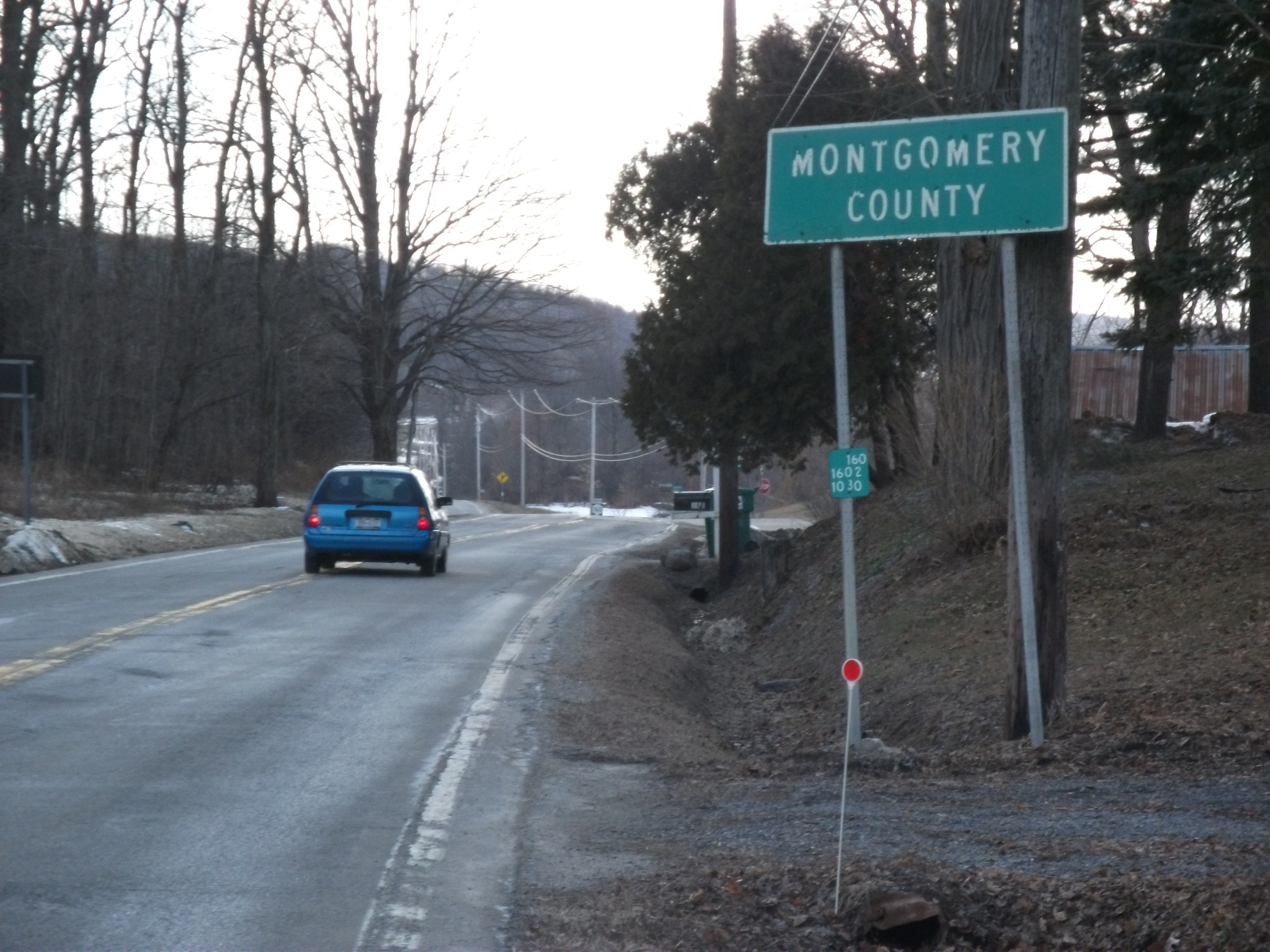
NY 160 at the Montgomery–Schenectady County line

NY 160 begins at an intersection with NY 159 near the northern edge of the hamlet of Mariaville Lake in western Schenectady County. The route heads north through rural Duanesburg, intersecting with Dennison Road (CR 96) before merging with Sulphur Springs Road on the Schenectady–Montgomery County line. NY 160 straddles the county line for roughly 0.6 miles (1.0 km) (and is officially located in Montgomery County for 0.4 miles or 0.6 kilometres) through the hamlet of Scotch Church prior to turning east off the county line as it exits the community. While in Montgomery County, NY 160 intersects one road of note: Thayer Road (CR 165), a connector leading northwest to the city of Amsterdam.

Back in Schenectady County, NY 160 clips the northeastern corner of the town of Duanesburg and passes quietly through Princetown on its way to Rotterdam. Just past the town line, NY 160 descends into the valley surrounding the Mohawk River and passes under the New York State Thruway (Interstate 90) as it enters the hamlet of Pattersonville, the western portion of a census-designated place that includes nearby Rotterdam Junction. The route continues northeast for an additional 500 feet (150 m) before making a hard left to avoid the Mohawk-Hudson Bike-Hike Trail (the former Selkirk Subdivision railroad). NY 160 parallels the trail for roughly 400 feet (120 m) before ending at NY 5S at a sharp angle.

== History ==
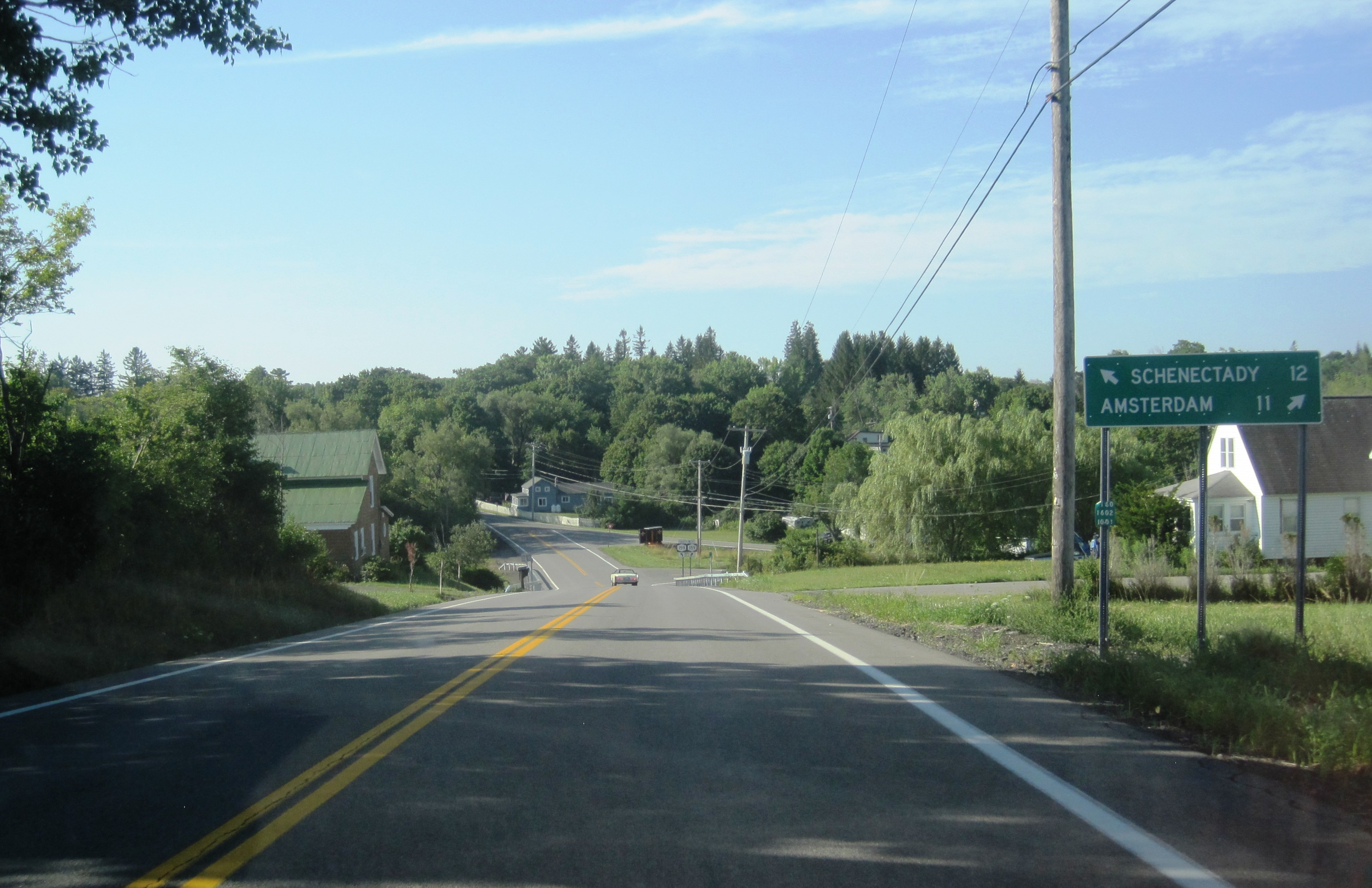
Southern terminus of NY 160 at NY 159 in Mariaville, formerly the southern terminus of NY 407

When NY 160 was originally assigned in 1930, it began at NY 5S south of Amsterdam and proceeded southeast through the town of Florida on Thayer Road to the hamlet of Scotch Church near the Montgomery–Schenectady County line. Here, it turned northeast to follow Scotch Church Road through the Rotterdam to the hamlet of Pattersonville, where it rejoined NY 5S. South of Scotch Church, what is now NY 160 was designated as NY 407 around the same time. Both NY 160 and NY 407 went unchanged until April 1, 1981, when ownership and maintenance of NY 160 northwest of Scotch Church was transferred from the state of New York to Montgomery County as part of a highway maintenance swap between the two levels of government. NY 160 was rerouted south of Scotch Church to follow NY 407 to Mariaville, resulting in the elimination of the NY 407 designation. The former routing of NY 160 on Thayer Road became CR 165.

== Major intersections ==
County	Location	mi	km	Destinations	Notes
Schenectady	Town of Duanesburg	0.00	0.00	NY 159 – Schenectady, Amsterdam	Southern terminus; hamlet of Mariaville Lake
Montgomery	Florida	2.90	4.67	Thayer Road (CR 165) – Amsterdam	Former routing of NY 160; hamlet of Scotch Church
Schenectady	Town of Rotterdam	6.58	10.59	NY 5S – Amsterdam, Schenectady	Northern terminus; hamlet of Pattersonville
1.000 mi = 1.609 km; 1.000 km = 0.621 mi

== See also ==
- List of county routes in Montgomery County, New York
