= Quaker Street Historic District =

Historic district in New York, United States

- U.S. National Register of Historic Places
- U.S. Historic district
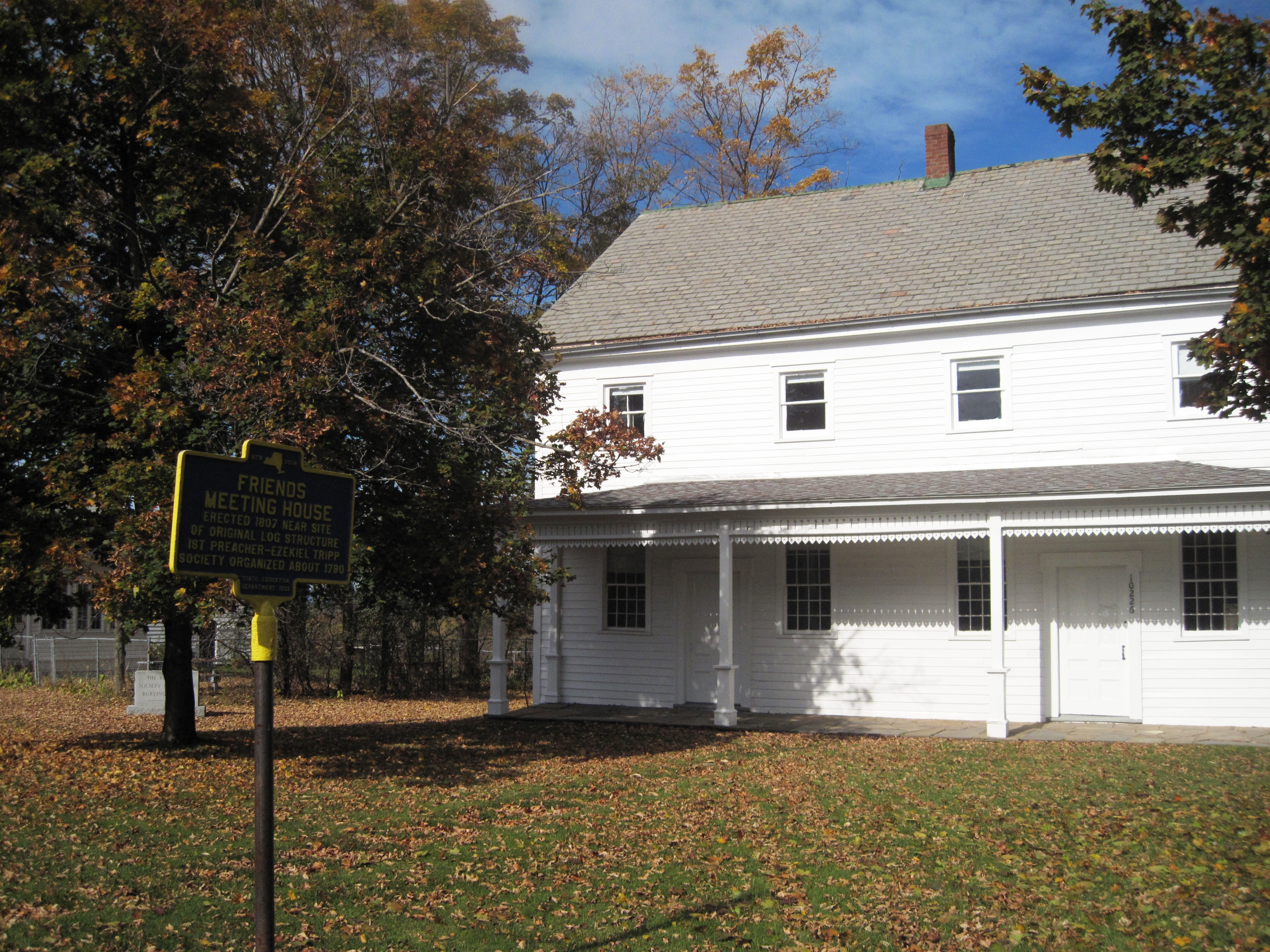
- Quaker Meeting House, October 2009

- Location within New York Location within the United States
- Location: Schoharie Tpk., Gallupville and Darby Hill Rds., Duanesburg, New York
- Coordinates: 42°44′1″N 74°11′16″W
- Area: 37 acres (15 ha)
- Built: 1817
- Architectural style: Greek Revival, Late Victorian, Federal
- MPS: Duanesburg MRA
- NRHP reference No.: 84003270
- Added to NRHP: October 11, 1984

Quaker Street Historic District is a national historic district located at Duanesburg in Schenectady County, New York. The district includes 61 contributing buildings on 43 properties in the hamlet of Quaker Street. It is predominantly residential, consisting mainly of one and one half and two story frame buildings. The district also includes the Quaker Meetinghouse (c. 1807), McDonald Shoe Factory (c. 1850), and Darious Gaige Store (c. 1830s). The buildings date from about 1807 to about 1910 and are representative of vernacular Federal and Greek Revival styles.

The property was covered in a 1984 study of Duanesburg historical resources. It was listed on the National Register of Historic Places in 1984.
