= New York State Route 337 =

State highway in Schenectady County, New York, US

New York State Route 337
- Map of Schenectady in eastern New York with NY 337 highlighted in red

Route information
- Maintained by NYSDOT
- Length: 2.61 mi (4.20 km)
- Existed: April 1, 1980–present

Major junctions
- South end: NY 7 in Rotterdam
- North end: I-890 in Rotterdam

Location
- Country: United States
- State: New York
- Counties: Schenectady

Highway system
- New York Highways; Interstate; US; State; Reference; Parkways
← NY 336	→ NY 338

New York State Route 337 (NY 337) is a short state highway located entirely within the Town of Rotterdam in Schenectady County, New York. It forms a connection from NY 7 to Interstate 890 along the western edge of the city of Schenectady and passes by the Rotterdam Square shopping mall.

== Route description ==
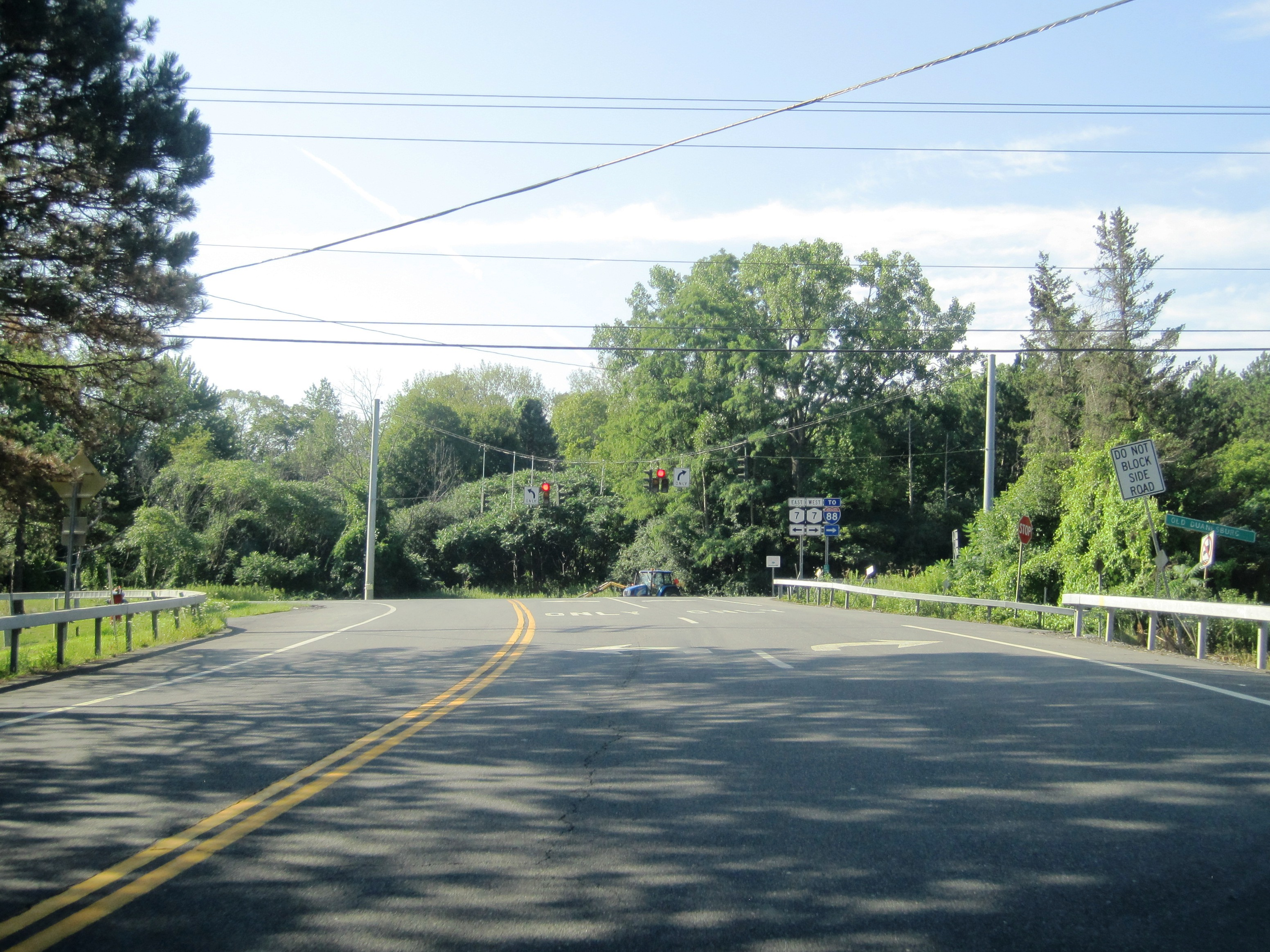
Southern terminus of NY 337 at NY 7 in Rotterdam

NY 337 begins at NY 7 (Duanesburg Road) just southeast of New York State Thruway (Interstate 90) exit 25A in the Schenectady County town of Rotterdam and heads northeast as the two-lane Burdeck Street through a largely residential area of the town. Just over a half-mile (0.8 km) from NY 7, NY 337 intersects NY 159 (Mariaville Road). North of NY 159, the structures surrounding the route gradually become more commercial and industrial in nature. This trend ends, however, upon crossing the CSX Transportation-owned Selkirk Subdivision.

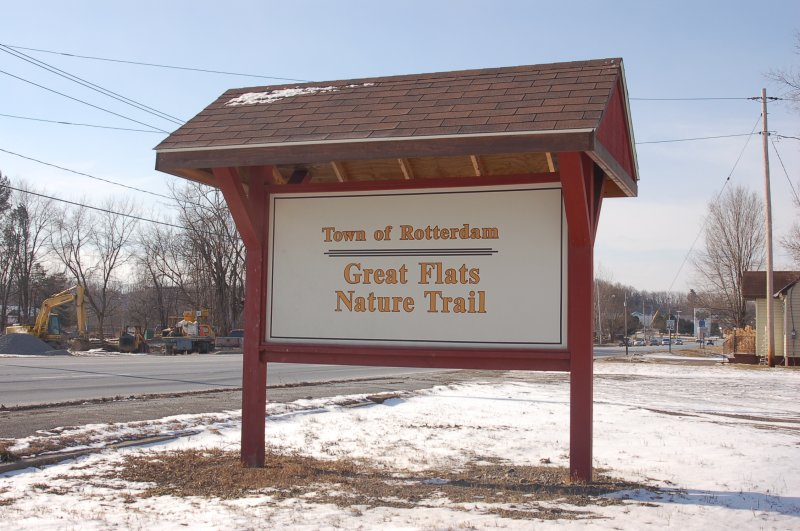
Signage for the Great Flats Nature Trail on NY 337 near I-890

The route continues on through lightly developed residential and commercial neighborhoods to West Campbell Road, a westward extension of Schenectady's Campbell Avenue. While Burdeck ends here, NY 337 continues on, following Campbell northwest under the Delaware and Hudson Railway mainline as the route descends into a small valley surrounding Poentic Kill. At the base of the dip, NY 337 widens to four lanes as it approaches Rotterdam Square, a large shopping mall situated to the east of Campbell Road. The route heads north, then east along the western and northern edges of the mall property before curving to the northeast toward the Mohawk River. NY 337 passes east of the Great Flats Nature Trail in its final quarter-mile (0.4 km) before terminating at Interstate 890 exit 2 across the river from Scotia.

== History ==
Burdeck Street and the portion of West Campbell Road between Burdeck and Interstate 890 were maintained by Schenectady County until April 1, 1980, when both were transferred to New York State as part of a large highway maintenance swap between the two levels of government. Following the swap, the two roads were designated as NY 337. The bridge carrying NY 337 over Poentic Kill near the western entrance to Rotterdam Square, 25.9 metres (85 ft) in length, was replaced in 1999.

== Major intersections ==
The entire route is in Rotterdam, Schenectady County.

mi	km	Destinations	Notes
0.00	0.00	NY 7 (Duanesburg Road) to I-88	Southern terminus
0.54	0.87	NY 159 (Mariaville Road)	
2.61	4.20	I-890 west to I-90 west / New York Thruway – Amsterdam	Northern terminus; exit 2 (I-890); westbound on/ off ramps and eastbound off ramp only
2.61	4.20	To I-890 east / I-90 east / New York Thruway – Schenectady	To exit 4 (I-890) via unsigned NY 912W; eastern terminus of unsigned NY 912W
1.000 mi = 1.609 km; 1.000 km = 0.621 mi: Incomplete access
