= Joseph Braman House =

Historic house in New York, United States

- U.S. National Register of Historic Places
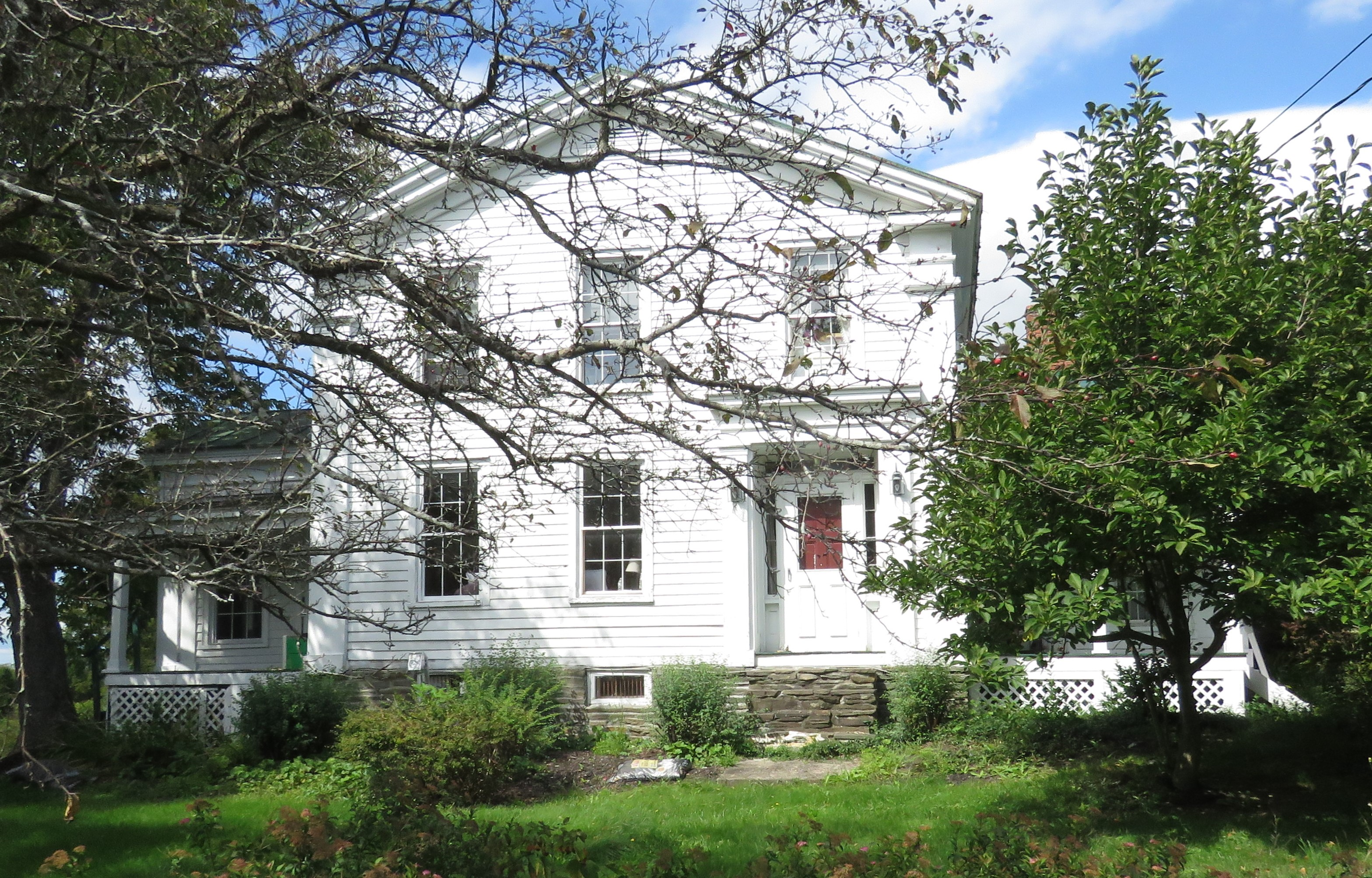

- Location within New York Location within the United States
- Interactive map showing the location of Joseph Braman House
- Location: Braman's Corners; Duanesburg, New York
- Coordinates: 42°48′31″N 74°13′10″W
- Area: 0.7 acres (0.28 ha)
- Built: 1850s
- Architectural style: Greek Revival; Vernacular Greek Revival
- MPS: Duanesburg MRA
- NRHP reference No.: 87000917
- Added to NRHP: April 24, 1987

The Joseph Braman House is a historic house located at Braman's Corners in Duanesburg, Schenectady County, New York.

== Description and history ==
It was built in the 1850s and is a two-story, three-bay wide frame building on a random-coursed stone foundation in a constructed vernacular Greek Revival style. It has a gabled roof, flanking one-story wings, and a 1 1/2-story rear wing. Also on the property is a contributing carriage house.

The property was covered in a 1984 study of Duanesburg historical resources. It was listed on the National Register of Historic Places on April 24, 1987.
