= Five Corners, Rotterdam =

Coordinates: 42°47′24.2″N 73°58′48.5″W

Five Corners is an intersection of New York State Route 7 (Duanesburg Road to the west, and Curry Road to the east), New York State Route 159 (Princetown Road just after an intersection with Mariaville Road), Broadway as an extension of Duanesburg Road, and Wallace Avenue in Rotterdam, New York, just south of the city of Schenectady. It is part of a large suburban and semi-industrial/warehousing hub that includes freight rail connections in the area.
