= Great Flats Nature Trail =

Protected habitat in Rotterdam, New York

Coordinates: 42.813159°N 73.983393°W

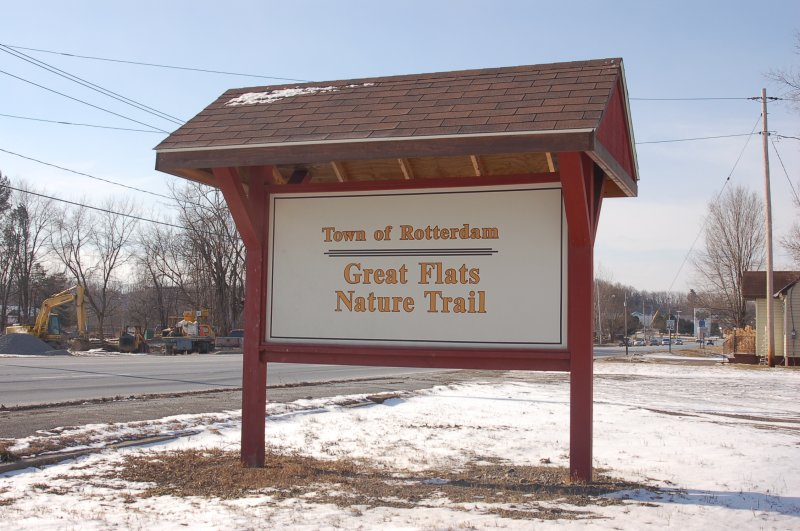
- Trail entrance sign
- Length: 4 mi (6.4 km)
- Location: New York, United States
- Use: Recreation and Natural History
- Difficulty: Easy
- Season: All year round
- Sights: Variety of birds and other wildlife
- Hazards: Deep mud and open water

The Great Flats Nature Trail is a protected wetland habitat mostly located in the town of Rotterdam, New York, United States. It is situated just west of the city of Schenectady on West Campbell Road (NY 337).

== History ==
The Great Flats date back to 1661 when Van Curler, a statesman from Schenectady, New York along with 14 other persons applied to Peter Stuyvesant, the Dutch Director-General of New York for permission to buy a tract of land known by its Dutch name of Groote Vlachte, (Great Flats) from the Mohawk.

The area was originally an alluvial tract of land alongside the Mohawk River and contained several hundred acres of land. At that time it was a mainly cleared area which held water well enabling crops to be grown but had good drainage to prevent flooding. The area was settled by the Dutch and many farmsteads were set up

As the towns of Schenectady and Rotterdam grew, the area became an important source of water for the towns in 1897 the first public wells were installed to utilize the Great Flats aquifer. and still remains so today drawing more than 54 million gallons a day.

In the 1960s a proposal was put forward to build a shopping mall called Rotterdam Square Mall on the land. The building of the mall was dogged with controversy when it was first proposed. The area was at the time a nature preserve and environmental groups were concerned that the building of the mall would endanger wildlife and pollute the wet lands. Eventually a permit was given containing numerous deed restrictions These restrictions, were put in place in order to protect this critical area, prohibit any further construction or excavation activities, improvements or changes of any kind or nature, except as permitted by the Department of Environmental Conservation (DEC) for a wildlife sanctuary, park, and nature trails.

Today, the area has been tidied up and contains a variety of protected habitats for both woodland and wetland species of animals and birds. There is however constant pressure to develop land adjacent to the preserve and many environmental groups are involved in protecting it.

== Status ==
The Great Flats Nature Preserve is classed as containing Class I wetland; Class I is the most environmentally sensitive of the five wetlands classifications. Wetlands serve as filters which remove pollutants from surface water and are important for the purity of aquifer water as well as for the health and cleanliness of the river.

== The trail ==
From the trailhead, a well-defined path is followed through woodland displaying a variety of plants and trees. The wooded area eventually gives way to wetlands and a small lake. Here the path becomes a boardwalk round the lake. The trail is a circular route of about 3 miles (4.8 km) total, there are several small side paths taking the total trail length to about 4 miles (6.4 km).

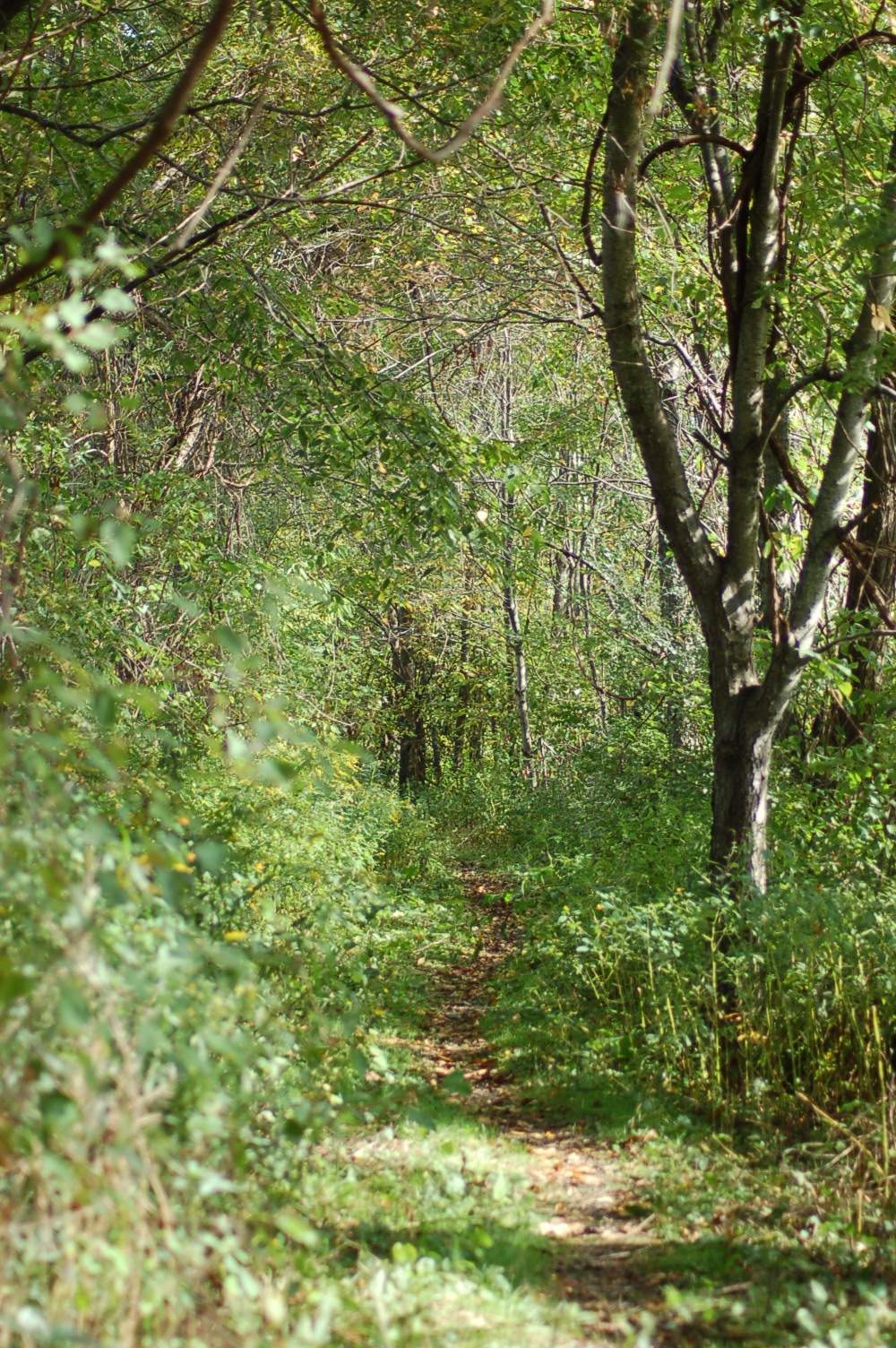
Typical path through the woodland

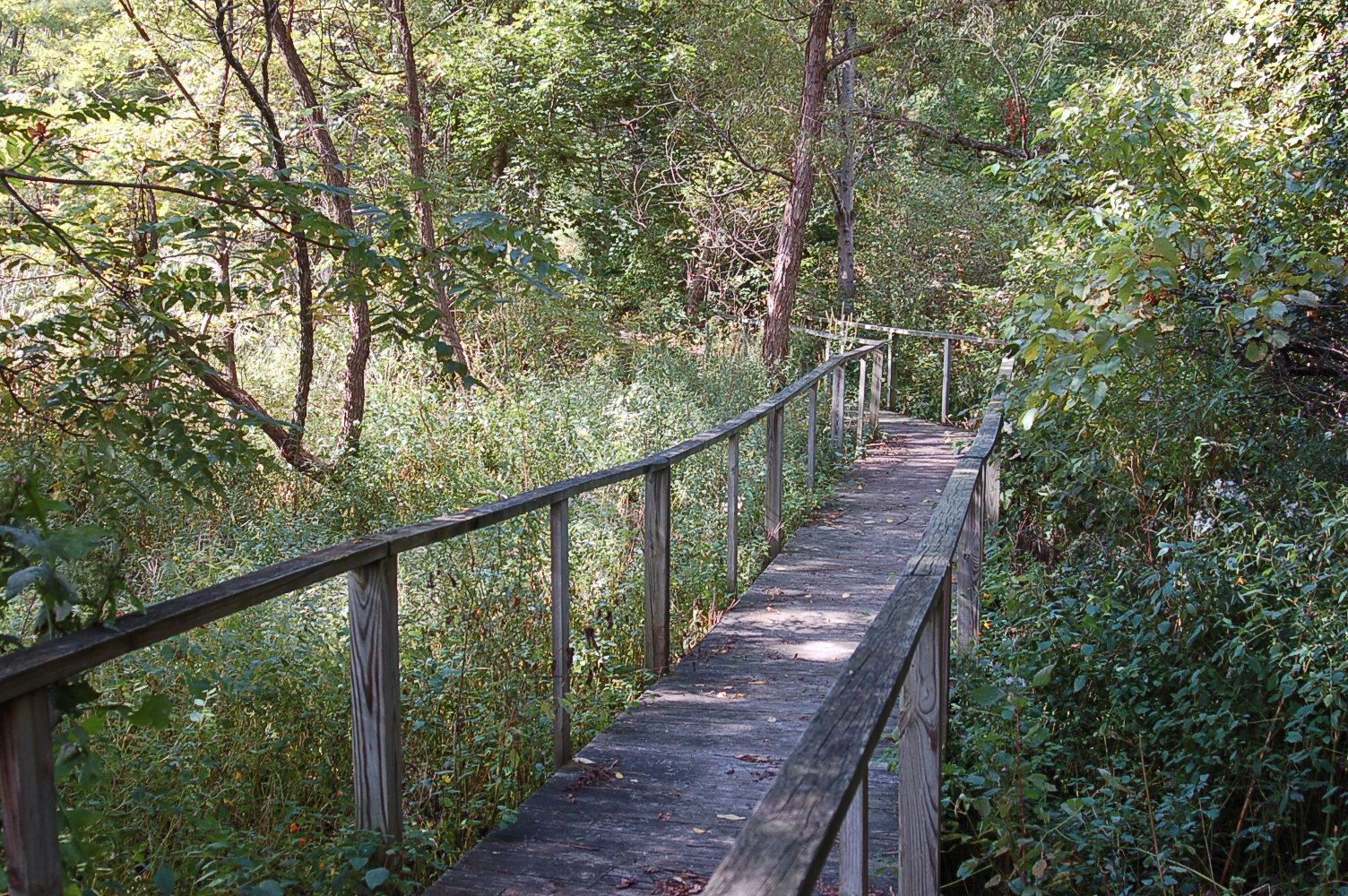
Section of the boardwalk

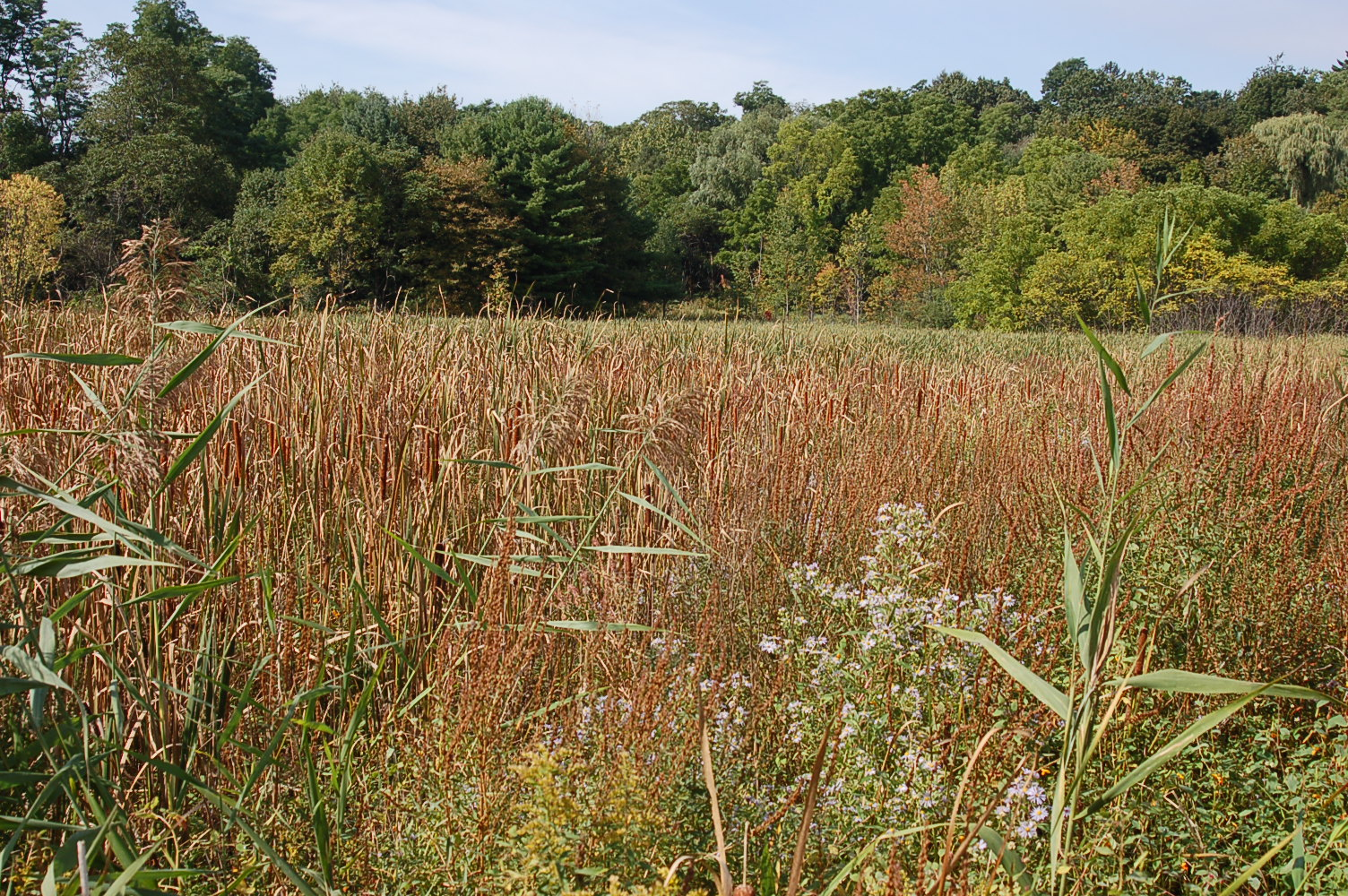
Rushes along the edge of the lake

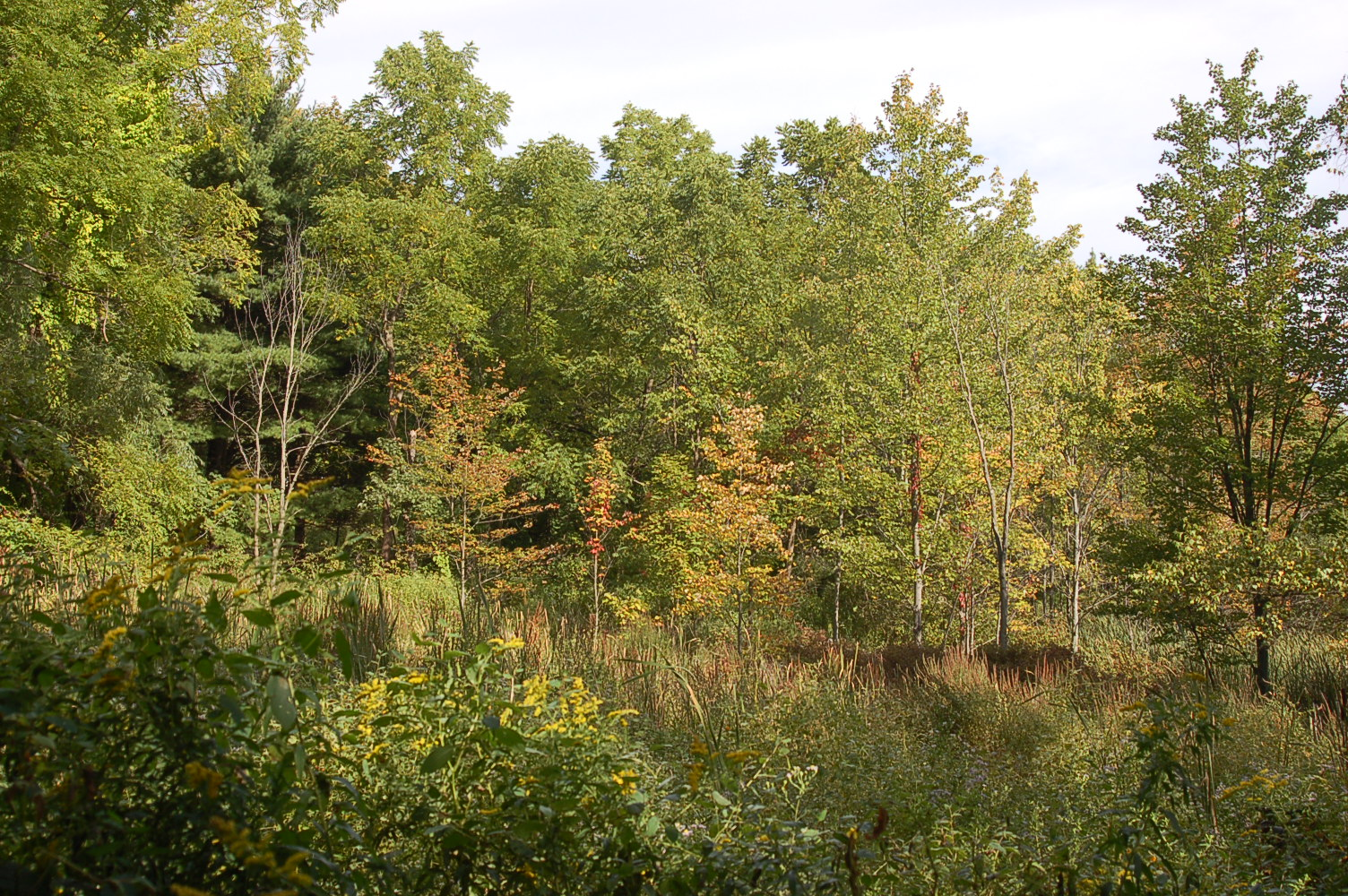
General View

== Natural history ==
The area provides both dry wood and wetland habitats that support many species of trees, plants, animals and insects. Many of the animals whilst not rare or endangered are found locally only in this area.

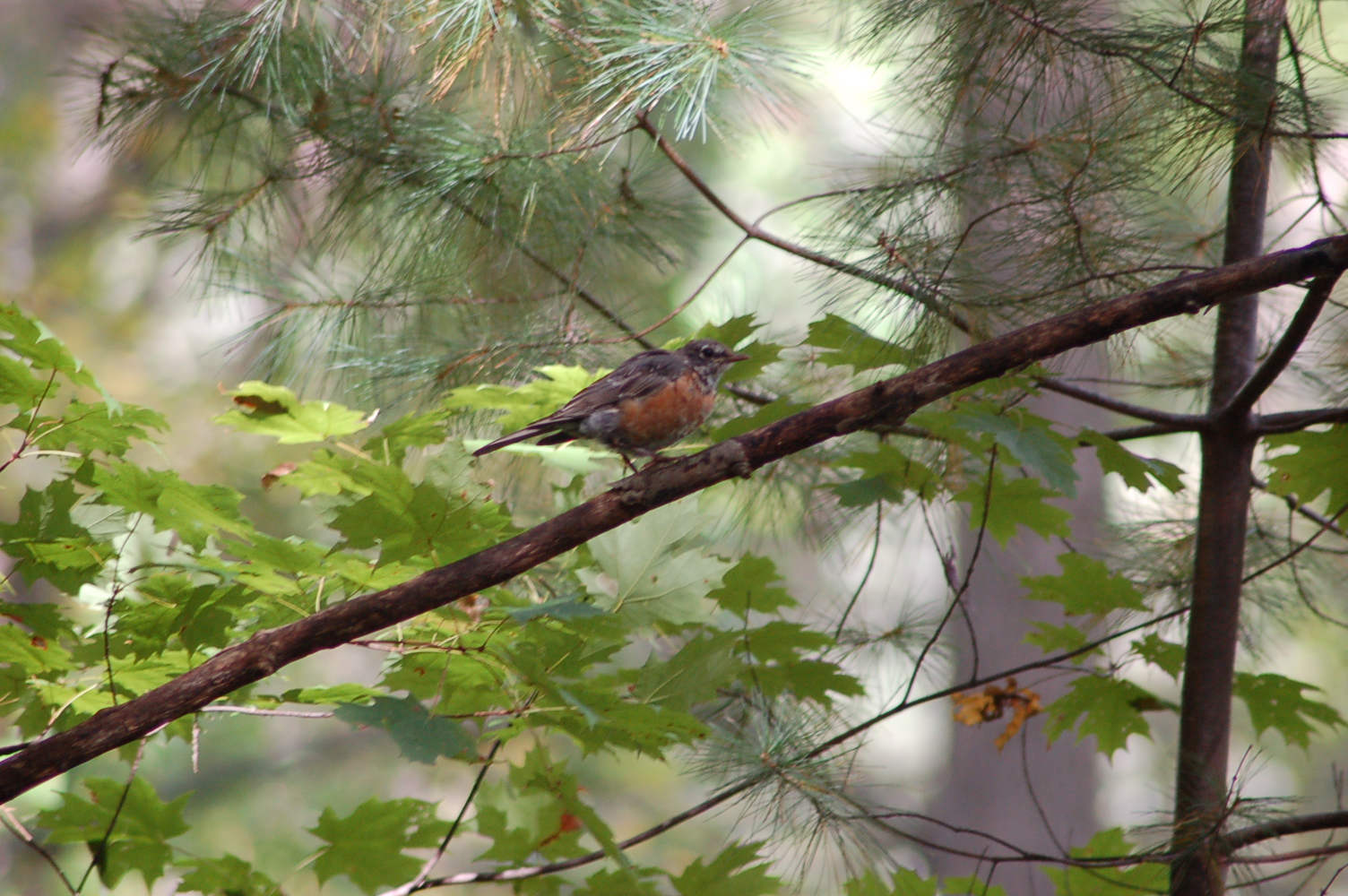
Robin

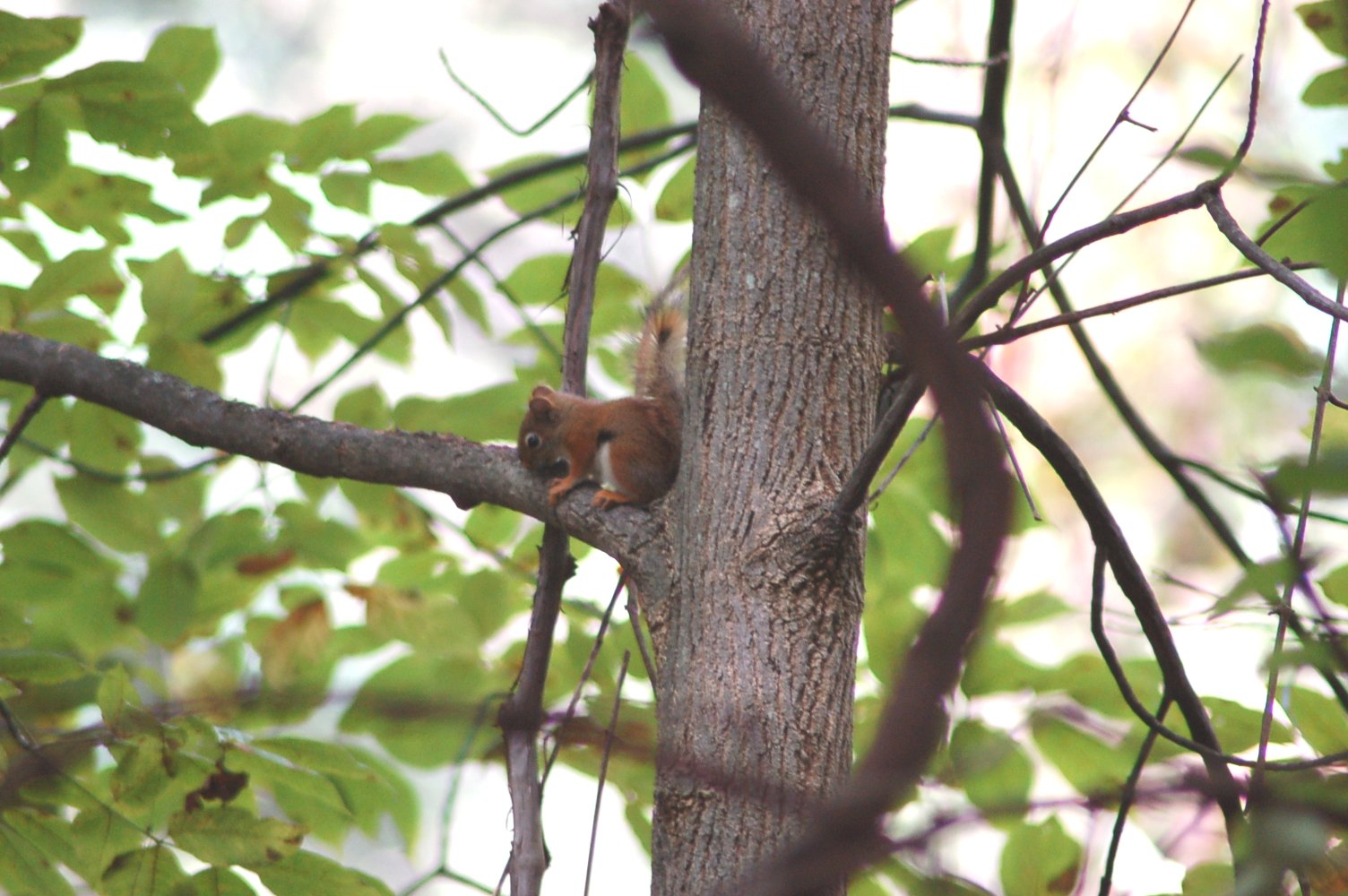
Red Squirrel

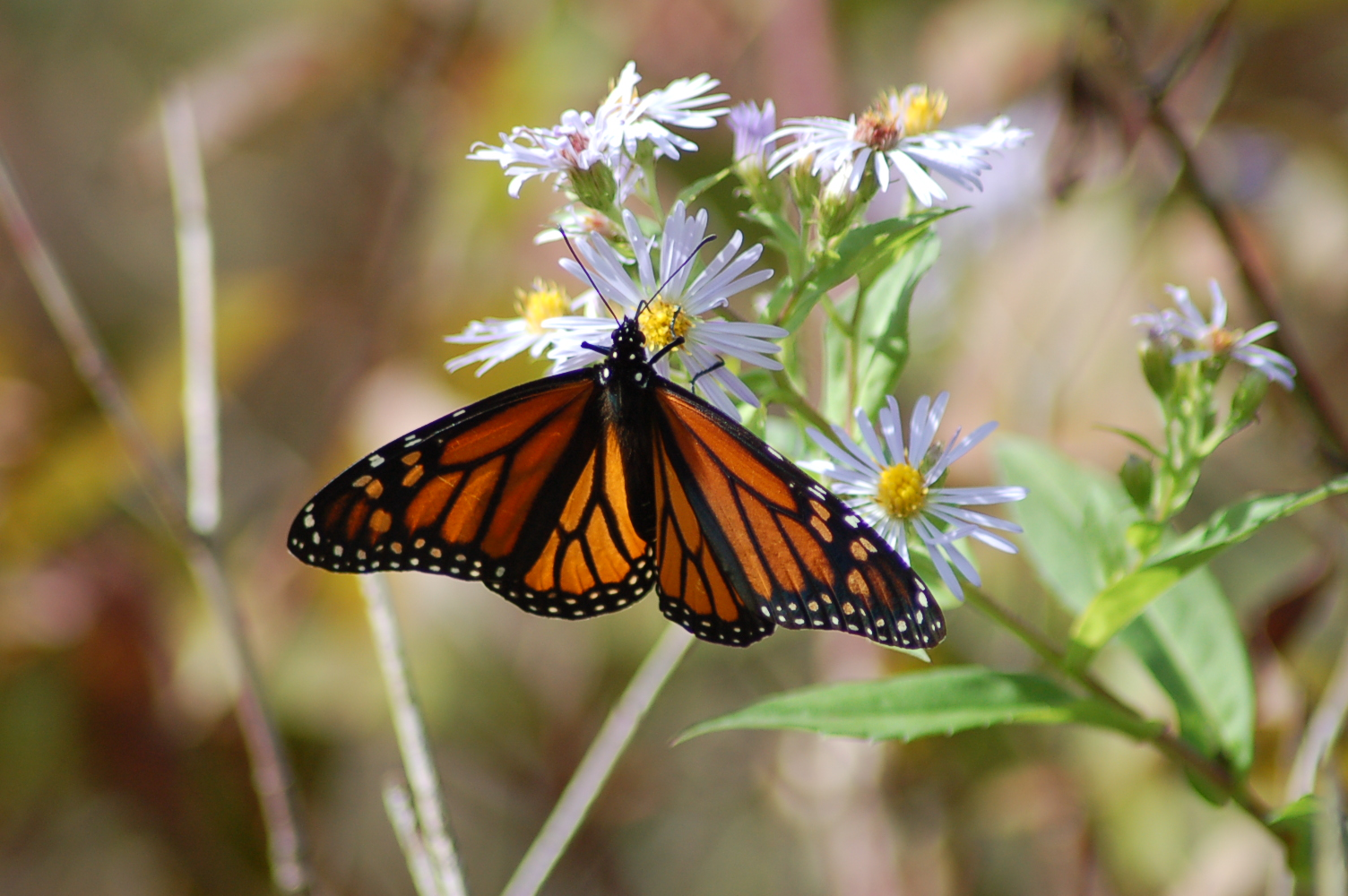
Monarch Butterfly

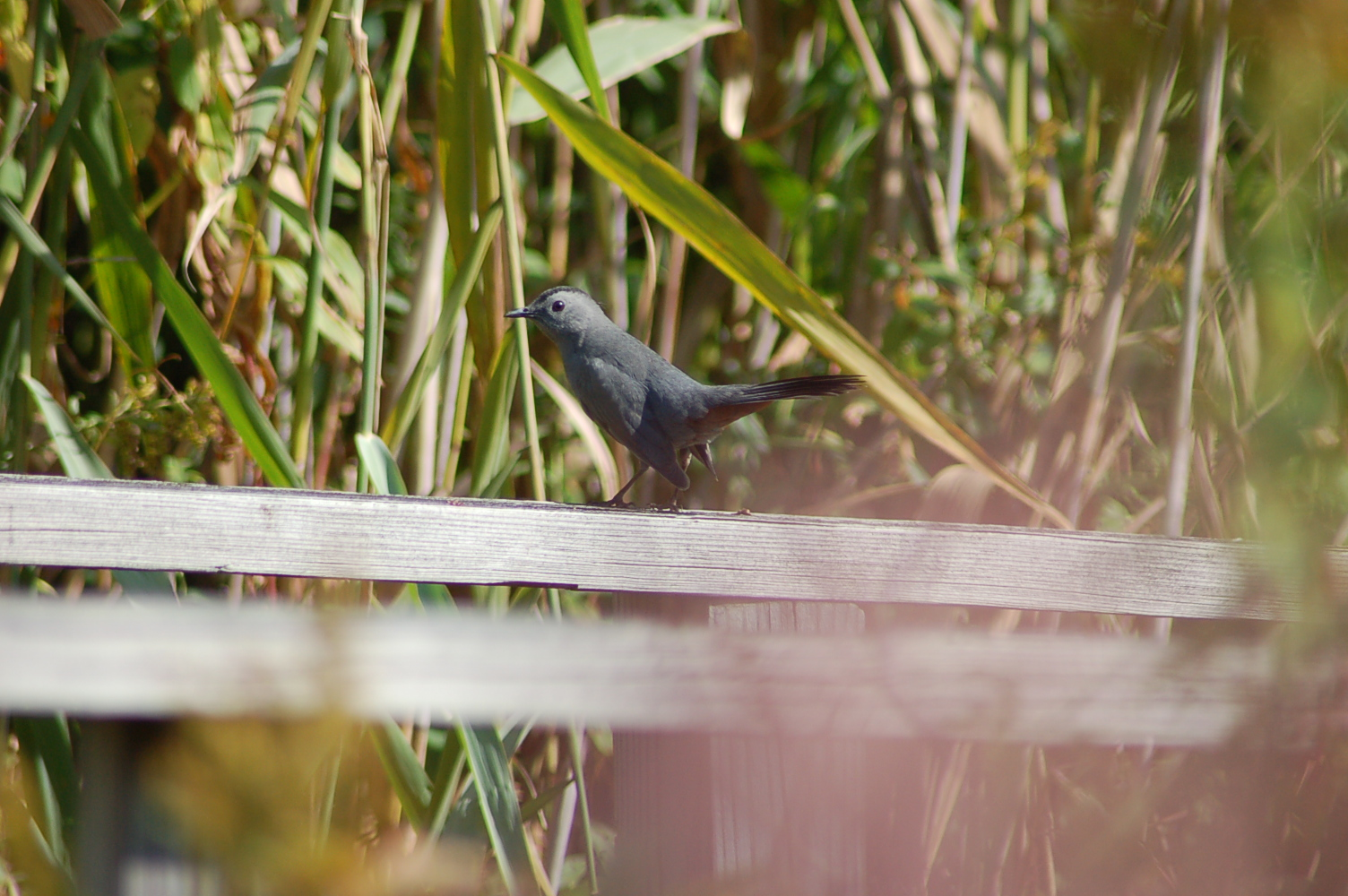
Catbird

== See also ==
- Rotterdam Square Mall
