= Isabelle Bronk =

American academic

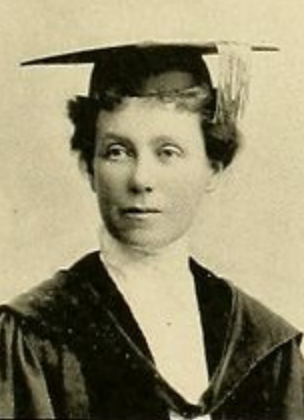
- Isabelle Bronk, from the 1906 yearbook of Swarthmore College
- Born: December 4, 1858; Duanesburg, New York
- Died: January 10, 1943 (aged 84); Media, Pennsylvania
- Occupations: College professor, writer
- Relatives: Detlev Bronk (nephew)

Isabelle Anna Bronk (December 4, 1858 – January 10, 1943) was an American college professor and head of the Romance Languages department at Swarthmore College from 1901 to 1927.

== Early life and education ==
Isabelle Bronk was born in Duanesburg, New York, the daughter of Abram Bronk and Cynthia Brewster Bronk. She trained as a teacher at the state normal school in Brockport, earned a bachelor's degree from Illinois Wesleyan University in 1893, and a PhD from the University of Chicago in 1900. She pursued further studies at Wellesley College and in Europe, at universities in Paris, Leipzig, Madrid, and Grenoble.

== Career ==
Bronk taught French at a private boarding school in New York City for three years, and at the University of Chicago from 1900 to 1901. She was head of the Romance Languages department at Swarthmore College from 1901 to 1927. She was an active member of the Women's International League for Peace and Freedom (WILPF), the American Association of University Women (AAUW), the Modern Language Association, and the Colonial Dames of America, among many other organizations. She attended the second conference of the International Federation of Women, held in Paris in 1922.

Her memoir Paris Memories (1927), presented "a telling picture of that side of Paris which is not gay and heedless but concerned with the graver aspects of living, and with tranquillity", according to one reviewer.

== Publications ==
- Poésies Diverses of Antoine Furetière (1908, edited and introduced by Bronk)
- "Notes on Méré" (1915)
- "Attainable Aims in Modern Language Teaching in Colleges, or, What May We Safely Hope to Accomplish in Modern Language Courses in College" (1921)
- Paris Memories (1927)

== Personal life ==
Bronk died in 1943, at a convalescent home in Media, Pennsylvania, at the age of 84. Scientist and college president Detlev Bronk was her nephew. Her niece was a university librarian, also named Isabelle Bronk (1903–1955).
