= Duane Lake, New York =

- Census-designated place
- Location in Schenectady County and the state of New York.
- Coordinates: 42°45′8″N 74°6′49″W
- Country: United States
- State: New York
- County: Schenectady

Area
  - Total: 2.59 sq mi (6.72 km^{2})
  - Land: 2.40 sq mi (6.22 km^{2})
  - Water: 0.19 sq mi (0.50 km^{2})
- Elevation: 922 ft (281 m)

Population (2020)
  - Total: 329
  - Density: 137.1/sq mi (52.93/km^{2})
- Time zone: UTC-5 (Eastern (EST))
  - Summer (DST): UTC-4 (EDT)
- FIPS code: 36-20989
- GNIS feature ID: 1852896

Duane Lake is a census-designated place (CDP) in Schenectady County, New York, United States. As of the 2020 census, Duane Lake had a population of 329.

The CDP is named after a small lake in the southern part of the town of Duanesburg.

== Geography ==
Duane Lake is located at 42°45′8″N 74°6′49″W (42.752223, -74.113563).

According to the United States Census Bureau, the CDP has a total area of 2.6 square miles (6.7 km^{2}), of which 2.4 square miles (6.2 km^{2}) is land and 0.2 square miles (0.52 km^{2}), or 7.00%, is water.

== Demographics ==
Historical population
Census	Pop.	Note	%±
2020	329		—
U.S. Decennial Census

As of the census of 2000, there were 357 people, 128 households, and 104 families residing in the CDP. The population density was 149.3 inhabitants per square mile (57.6/km^{2}). There were 144 housing units at an average density of 60.2 per square mile (23.2/km^{2}). The racial makeup of the CDP was 99.16% White, 0.28% Native American, 0.28% from other races, and 0.28% from two or more races. Hispanic or Latino of any race were 0.28% of the population.

There were 128 households, out of which 34.4% had children under the age of 18 living with them, 69.5% were married couples living together, 7.0% had a female householder with no husband present, and 18.8% were non-families. 10.2% of all households were made up of individuals, and 2.3% had someone living alone who was 65 years of age or older. The average household size was 2.79 and the average family size was 3.01.

In the CDP, the population was spread out, with 24.1% under the age of 18, 6.4% from 18 to 24, 28.6% from 25 to 44, 33.9% from 45 to 64, and 7.0% who were 65 years of age or older. The median age was 40 years. For every 100 females, there were 98.3 males. For every 100 females age 18 and over, there were 108.5 males.

The median income for a household in the CDP was $77,913, and the median income for a family was $78,702. Males had a median income of $45,278 versus $31,250 for females. The per capita income for the CDP was $28,530. About 8.0% of families and 11.1% of the population were below the poverty line, including 38.8% of those under age 18 and none of those age 65 or over.
