= Quaker Street, New York =

- hamlet
- Location within New York
- Coordinates: 42°44′05″N 74°11′10″W
- Country: United States
- State: New York
- County: Schenectady
- Elevation: 1,017 ft (310 m)
- Time zone: UTC-5 (Eastern (EST))
  - Summer (DST): UTC-4 (EDT)
- ZIP code: 12141
- Area code: 518
- GNIS feature ID: 962063

Quaker Street is a hamlet in the town of Duanesburg, Schenectady County, New York, United States. The zipcode is: 12141.
