= Mariaville Lake, New York =

- Census-designated place
- Location in Schenectady County in the state of New York.
- Coordinates: 42°49′43″N 74°7′24″W
- Country: United States
- State: New York
- County: Schenectady

Area
  - Total: 6.00 sq mi (15.55 km^{2})
  - Land: 5.63 sq mi (14.57 km^{2})
  - Water: 0.38 sq mi (0.98 km^{2})
- Elevation: 1,289 ft (393 m)

Population (2020)
  - Total: 666
  - Density: 118.4/sq mi (45.71/km^{2})
- Time zone: UTC-5 (Eastern (EST))
  - Summer (DST): UTC-4 (EDT)
- FIPS code: 36-45573
- GNIS feature ID: 1852906

Mariaville Lake is a census-designated place (CDP) in Schenectady County, New York. The population was 666 at the 2020 census.

The census-designated place is located in the town of Duanesburg and is named after a small lake in the eastern part of the town.

== Geography ==
Mariaville Lake is located at 42°49′43″N 74°7′24″W (42.828640, -74.123331).

According to the U.S. Census Bureau, the CDP has a total area of 6.0 square miles (16 km^{2}), of which 5.7 square miles (15 km^{2}) is land and 0.3 square miles (0.78 km^{2}), or 5.82%, is water.

== Demographics ==
Historical population
Census	Pop.	Note	%±
2010	722		—
2020	666		−7.8%
U.S. Decennial Census

As of the census of 2000, there were 710 people, 258 households, and 188 families residing in the CDP. The population density was 125.6 inhabitants per square mile (48.5/km^{2}). There were 341 housing units at an average density of 60.3 per square mile (23.3/km^{2}). The racial makeup of the CDP was 99.01% White, 0.14% African American, 0.42% Asian, 0.28% from other races, and 0.14% from two or more races. Hispanic or Latino of any race were 0.99% of the population.

There were 258 households, of which 38.0% had children under the age of 18 living with them, 58.5% were married couples living together, 9.3% had a female householder with no husband present, and 27.1% were non-families. 22.5% of all households were made up of individuals, and 7.4% had someone living alone who was 65 years of age or older. The average household size was 2.75, and the average family size was 3.23.

In the CDP, the population was spread out, with 29.4% under the age of 18, 6.2% from 18 to 24, 29.2% from 25 to 44, 25.4% from 45 to 64, and 9.9% who were 65 years of age or older. The median age was 37 years. For every 100 females, there were 107.6 males. For every 100 females age 18 and over, there were 106.2 males.

The median income for a household in the CDP was $48,269, and the median income for a family was $57,083. Males had a median income of $41,216 versus $22,269 for females. The per capita income for the CDP was $20,618. None of the population or families were below the poverty line.
