= Duanesburg, New York =

- Town
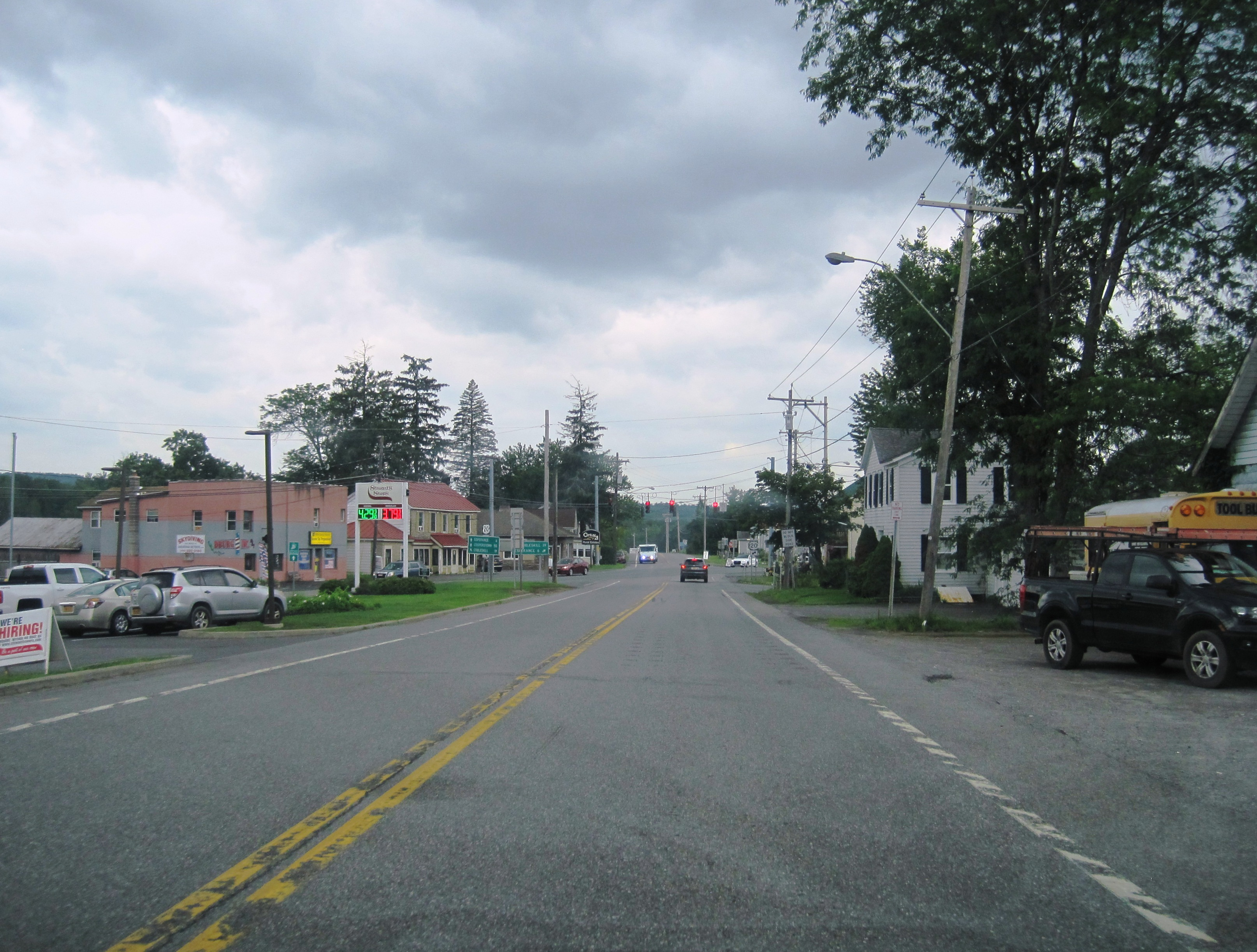
- New York State Route 7 approaching U.S. Route 20 in Duanesburg
- Nickname: D-Burg
- Location in Schenectady County and the state of New York.
- Coordinates: 42°46′51″N 74°10′14″W
- Country: United States
- State: New York
- County: Schenectady

Area
  - Total: 72.03 sq mi (186.56 km^{2})
  - Land: 70.78 sq mi (183.33 km^{2})
  - Water: 1.25 sq mi (3.23 km^{2})
- Elevation: 1,280 ft (390 m)

Population (2020)
  - Total: 5,863
  - Density: 82.83/sq mi (31.98/km^{2})
- Time zone: UTC-5 (Eastern (EST))
  - Summer (DST): UTC-4 (EDT)
- ZIP code: 12056
- Area code: 518
- FIPS code: 36-21006
- GNIS feature ID: 0978910
- Website: Town of Duanesburg

Duanesburg is a town in Schenectady County, New York, United States. The population was 5,863 at the 2020 census. Duanesburg is named for James Duane, who held most of it as an original land grant. The town is in the western part of the county.

== History ==
Originally known as Duanes' Bush, Duanesburg was established as a township by patent on March 13, 1765. According to Documentary History of New York Vol. lV, pg. 1067, "Mr. Duane entered in March, 1765 into contract with a company of twenty Germans from Pennsylvania of whom about sixteen (families) came on tract, and they made the first permanent settlement in that now flourishing town". The township was combined with Schoharie, New York, as the United Districts of Schoharie and Duanesburg on March 24, 1772, which became the town of Schoharie in 1788. Duanesburg became its own town once again in 1789.

The town's earliest settlers chiefly comprised English Quakers from Dutchess County, New York, as well as a group of settlers who were originally from the town of Kent, Connecticut.

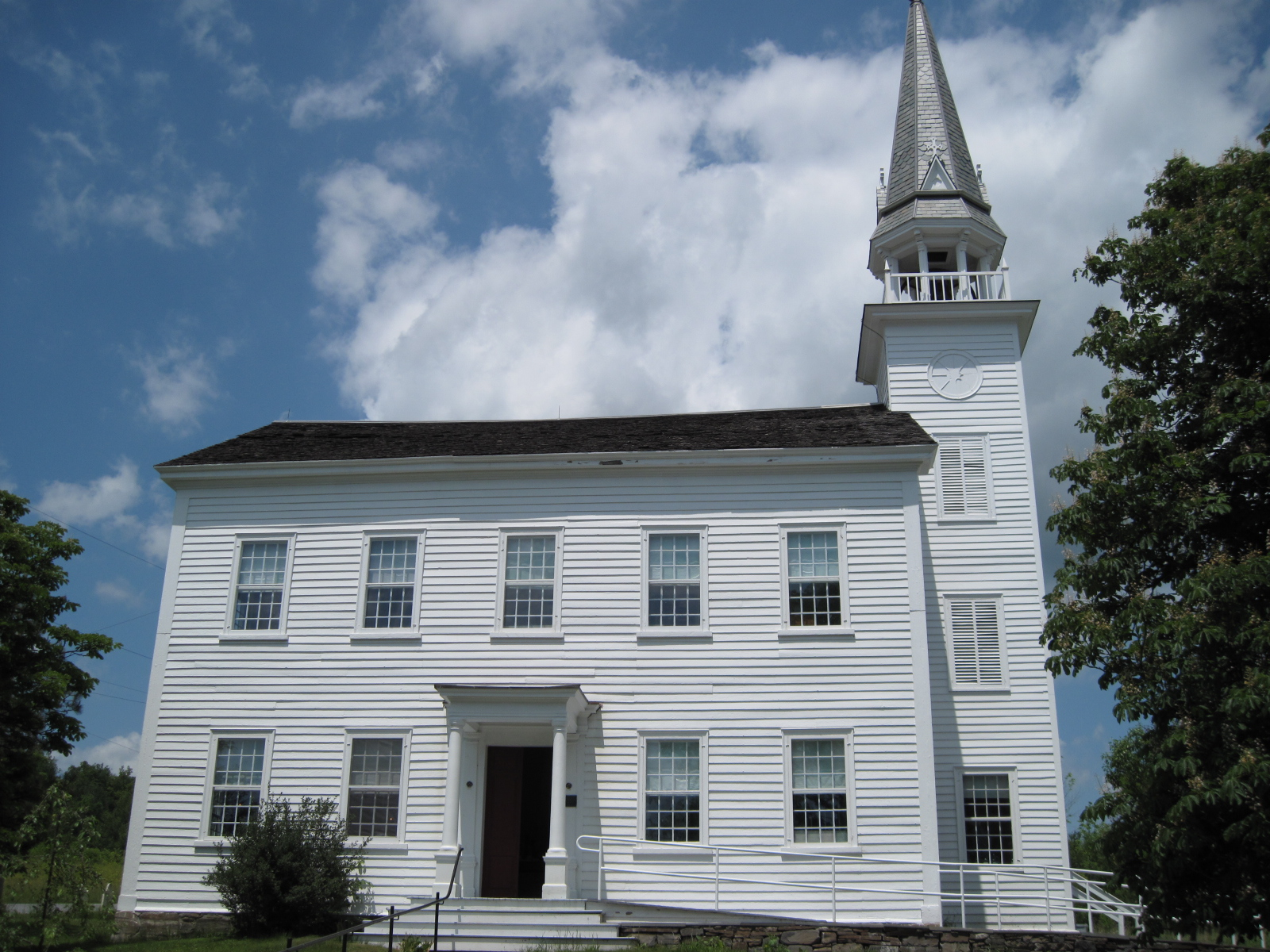
Christ Episcopal Church, June 2009

The village of Delanson within the town of Duanesburg was an important stop for the Delaware and Hudson Railroad. Major freight traffic carried Pennsylvania coal northeast through Duanesburg and on to Albany, Boston, and other major eastern cities. In the flat-bottomed valley east of the village of Delanson were huge coal storage piles over 100 feet (30 m) high. The village of Delanson had a rough reputation at the time, catering to "rowdy" railroad men. Many densely packed wooden shops lined the village street on the north and south sides of the tracks. Most of the rest of the town of Duanesburg was dairy farms. Pine Grove Farms was the most notable dairy farm.

In the late 20th century farming fell into decline, and the town became a home for commuters working in Albany and Schenectady. Many of the "great" farm families of Duanesburg (the Liddles, Gages, and others) saw their farms shut down and children move on. Most of the farms were subdivided into smaller parcels in the 1970-2000 period. The disappearance of open land was most apparent from 1975 to 1989. Commuters built homes with average lot sizes of 2+ acres. This zone beyond suburbia is termed "exurbia". Most commuters in Duanesburg travel from 16 to 33 miles (26 to 53 km) each way. Interstate 88 has made the commute east significantly easier since its completion in the early 1980s. General Electric provided a stable and lucrative income for many non-agricultural residents who built homes in the town during this time.

== Economy ==
Since 2000 a number of factors has contributed to an economic slowdown in the town. Regional economic prosperity shifted north of Albany (a difficult commute from Duanesburg). An aging population with no available low-cost housing for young people makes it hard for the young to stay. Housing stock is mostly limited to single family homes and antiquated multi-unit properties. Lack of available water for some commercial/industrial uses has limited this type of growth. Despite this, the town government has support the birth and growth of the first Winery in Duanesburg, Helderberg Meadworks, which began selling their mead in October 2012 through local wine stores and as of June 2014 has expanded to statewide distribution.

Due to a lack of diversity in revenue (lack of commercial and industrial presence), individual property taxes may be higher than those of the surrounding area. The town's small population's desire to maintain a school district, two water districts, 46 miles of town owned-roads and other services have required that taxes be collected, but the town and school boards have attempted to contain costs as much as possible.

The town has been known for its many private airports. Skydiving is one activity that has brought in visitors for the last 30 years, although skydiving operations have since moved to Saratoga. Jonathan's Restaurant is located next to one of the airports. During the late 1990s Harrison Ford used to be a repeat visitor at the restaurant during rest stops at the local airport while en route to other destinations. The restaurant has since closed. Knox Airport (private), located the neighboring town of Knox, in Albany County, was involved in a large drug investigation. There have been numerous small airplane crashes over the last couple decades, and at least one suicide/fatality from skydiving.

In addition to skydiving, the town is known for cross-country skiing. Beardsford Farms and Oak Hill provided miles of trails on hundreds of acres. Both areas are now closed. The town continues to provide an extensive network of ATV trails through picturesque woods and rural land, most of which is private. Snowmobiling is popular during the winter; residents use the same ATV trails to access other trail networks in Albany, Schoharie, and Montgomery counties.

== Geography ==
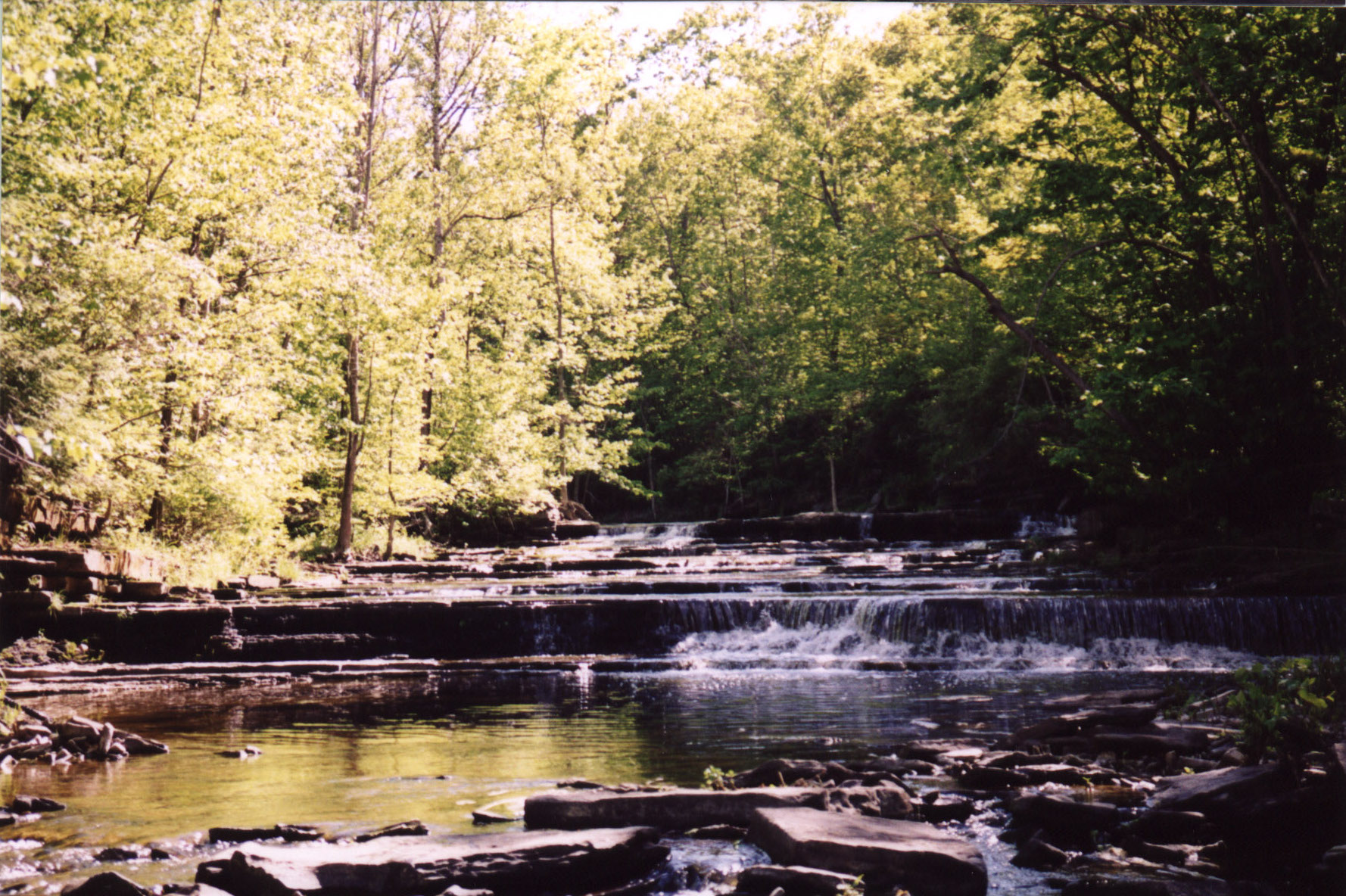
Normanskill Creek in Duanesburg

According to the United States Census Bureau, the town has a total area of 72.0 square miles (186.6 km^{2}), of which 70.8 square miles (183.3 km^{2}) is land and 1.2 square miles (3.2 km^{2}), or 1.74%, is water.

The town consists of mostly wooded hills up to an elevation of approximately 1,400 feet (430 m) above sea level. Most of the town was cleared farmland until the late 20th century. After this point forests grew to cover 60% of the total land area with a canopy higher than 40 feet (12 m). The forest is primary composed of poplar, hemlock, oak, maple, white pine, and balsam fir. The maximum tree heights in Duanesburg are approximately 80 feet (24 m) high.

The town is the source of the Normans Kill and of Bozenkill Creek. These creeks drop over a series of rapids and waterfalls cut through shale and sandstone rock beds. Christman's Sanctuary highlights some of this topography.

Most of the soil contains clay, significant loose rock, and/or shallow depth, therefore making it inadequate for a large farming industry. There is a significant amount of swamps at high and low elevations in the town due to clay soil and past glacial activity.

The town is unique for its east-west oriented drumlins formed during the last ice age. Most drumlins (oblong hills of glacial sediment) in New York State are north-south oriented.

Due to its higher elevation and position, Duanesburg provides a view that extends as far as southern Vermont, the Adirondack Mountains, and the Catskill Mountains.

US 20, NY 7, and Interstate 88 pass through the town.

Part of the south town line is the border of Albany County. The rest of the south and part of the west town line is the border of Schoharie County. The rest of the west and part of the north town line is the border of Montgomery County.

== Demographics ==
Historical population
Census	Pop.	Note	%±
1820	3,510		—
1830	2,837		−19.2%
1840	3,357		18.3%
1850	3,464		3.2%
1860	3,222		−7.0%
1870	3,042		−5.6%
1880	2,995		−1.5%
1890	2,557		−14.6%
1900	2,428		−5.0%
1910	2,211		−8.9%
1920	2,115		−4.3%
1930	1,937		−8.4%
1940	2,141		10.5%
1950	2,822		31.8%
1960	3,070		8.8%
1970	3,800		23.8%
1980	4,729		24.4%
1990	5,474		15.8%
2000	5,808		6.1%
2010	6,122		5.4%
2020	5,863		−4.2%
U.S. Decennial Census

As of the census of 2000, there were 5,808 people, 2,141 households, and 1,663 families residing in the town. The population density was 81.5 inhabitants per square mile (31.5/km^{2}). There were 2,307 housing units at an average density of 12.5 persons/km^{2} (32.4 persons/sq mi). The racial makeup of the town was 97.66% White, 0.45% African American, 0.29% Native American, 0.28% Asian, 0.03% Pacific Islander, 0.28% from other races, and 1.02% from two or more races. Hispanic or Latino of any race were 0.81% of the population.

There were 2,141 households, out of which 38.0% had children under the age of 18 living with them, 66.6% were married couples living together, 7.0% had a female householder with no husband present, and 22.3% were non-families. 17.8% of all households were made up of individuals, and 5.9% had someone living alone who was 65 years of age or older. The average household size was 2.71 and the average family size was 3.07.

In the town, the population was spread out, with 26.9% under the age of 18, 5.6% from 18 to 24, 30.4% from 25 to 44, 27.8% from 45 to 64, and 9.3% who were 65 years of age or older. The median age was 38 years. For every 100 females, there were 101.0 males. For every 100 females age 18 and over, there were 101.9 males.

The median income for a household in the town was $58,463, and the median income for a family was $65,461. Males had a median income of $40,237 versus $28,125 for females. The per capita income for the town was $23,345. About 2.2% of families and 3.9% of the population were below the poverty line, including 6.1% of those under the age of 18 and 4.7% ages 65 or older.

== Communities and locations in Duanesburg ==
- Braman Corners – A hamlet in the western part of the town. The community was named after Joseph Braman. The Joseph Braman House stands there.
- Millers Corners – A hamlet in the northwestern part of the town.
- Delanson – The Village of Delanson in the southeast part of the town.
- Duane – A hamlet south of Duanesburg.
- Duanesburg – The hamlet of Duanesburg in the southern part of the town.
- Duanesburg Churches – A location north of Duanesburg.
- Duane Lake – A hamlet.
- Duane Lake – A small man-made lake southeast of Duanesburg village.
- Eaton Corners – A location in the western part of the town.
- Mariaville – A hamlet near the northeast town line.
- Mariaville Lake – A hamlet.
- Mariaville Lake – A small lake near the east town line.
- Quaker Street – A hamlet in the southwest part of the town. Much of the hamlet is included in the Quaker Street Historic District, listed on the National Register of Historic Places in 1984.

== Notable people ==
- Lisa Barlow, cast member on The Real Housewives of Salt Lake City
- Isabelle Bronk (1858–1943), head of the romance languages department at Swarthmore College, 1901–1927
- Blackleach Burritt, noted clergyman during the American Revolution
- Charles A. Cady, Wisconsin State Assemblyman
- Orestes Cleveland (1829–1896), mayor of Jersey City 1864-1867 and 1886–1892; represented New Jersey's 5th congressional district from 1869-1871
- Stephen J. Dubner, co-author of Freakonomics
- Nick Gwiazdowski, freestyle wrestler and two-time NCAA Division I Wrestling National Champion for North Carolina State University
- Marybeth Tinning (1942–present), convicted murderer of eight of her nine children
- Emma White, American cyclist

== See also ==
- Duanesburg High School
