= Via Port Rotterdam =

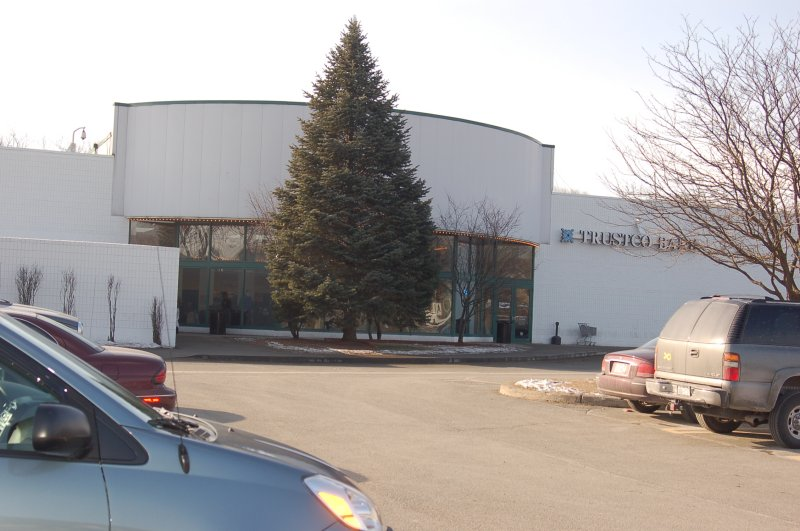
- View of the Food Court Entrance
- Location: Rotterdam, New York, United States
- Coordinates: 42°48′32″N 73°59′17″W
- Opened: September 1, 1988; 38 years ago
- Manager: Via Properties
- Owner: Via Properties
- Num. of stores: 36
- Num. of anchor tenants: 5 (4 open, 1 vacant)
- Floor area: 900,000 sq ft (84,000 m^{2})
- Floors: 1
- Public transit: CDTA bus: 354
- Website: viaportrotterdam.com

Via Port Rotterdam, formerly Rotterdam Square, is a shopping mall located in Rotterdam, New York, United States. When it opened, the mall was originally called Rotterdam Square and owned by Wilmorite Properties (who also owned Wilton Mall in Wilton) until 2005, when Wilmorite was acquired by The Macerich Company, who then took over ownership and management of most of their properties. The mall has an area of 900,000 square feet (84,000 m^{2}) on one level with 36 stores, a 450-seat food court as well as restaurants, an aquarium, entertainment center, and a seven-screen Sony-Loews Cineplex, now operated by Zurich Cinemas. The mall was purchased by Kohan Retail Investment Group in January 2014, and was later sold to Via Properties in June 2015. In 2016, Via Properties renamed the mall Via Port Rotterdam.

== History ==
The mall is situated on a site once owned by the Vedder Family. Harmen Albertse Vedder of Schenectady bought the land in 1672 and built a home on it. In 1832 Harmens' great-grandson Johannes sold it to Colonel Daniel David Schermerhorn Campbell, who constructed a 26-bedroom mansion on the site.

At the time of construction, the area around the mall was a nature preserve, and environmental groups were concerned that the building of the mall would endanger wildlife and pollute the wet lands on the opposite side of Route 337, now the Great Flats Nature Trail and Preserve.

In January 2015, Macy's, originally Hess's and later Filene's, announced that its store would be closing as part of a plan to close 14 stores nationwide. The space was taken over by a call center for the New York State Department of Taxation and Finance.

Mike Kohan bought the mall from Macerich in January 2014 for $8.5 million. In June 2015, the mall was sold for $9.25 million to Via Properties, which renamed the mall to Viaport Rotterdam in 2016. They announced plans to invest $10 million into mall improvements, including exterior upgrades, a 25,000-square-foot (2,300 m^{2}) aquarium, and a nearly 30,000 sq ft (2,800 m^{2}) entertainment center with a bowling alley, sports bar, restaurant, and arcade.

On April 21, 2016, it was announced that Sears would also be closing as part of a plan to close 78 stores nationwide. The store closed in July 2016. On October 15, 2018, Sears Holdings announced that Kmart would be closing as well in December 2018 as part of a plan to close 142 stores nationwide which left the mall with no anchor stores left.

== Features ==
=== Carousel ===
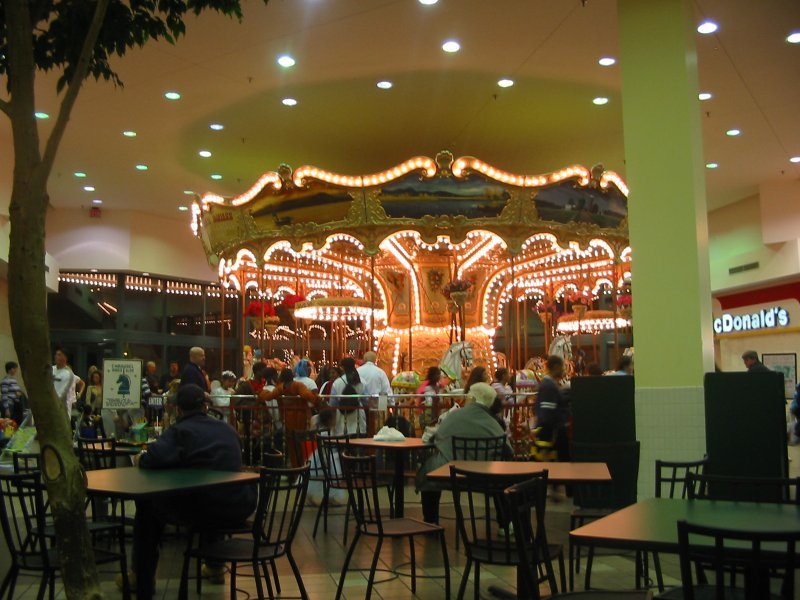
The carousel in the food court

From 1988 until January 2007, Rotterdam Square featured a full-size Italian carousel in the food court. The management sold the carousel in late 2006, and in January 2007, it was dismantled and moved to Southland Mall in Miami.

=== Graveyard ===
The mall features a graveyard within the complex. Located in a corner between the food court entrance and the front side entrance, the graveyard is the family cemetery of the Vedder Family dating back to around 1715.

=== Theater ===
A basic mall-based theater that was previously part of the Sony-Loews Cineplex (and then AMC) circuit. The theater was initially a six-screen cinema and is now operated by an independently owned theater company named Zurich Cinemas. The theater added a 7th screen and has been refitted with stadium seating, and digital projectors along with 3D capabilities.

== Gallery ==
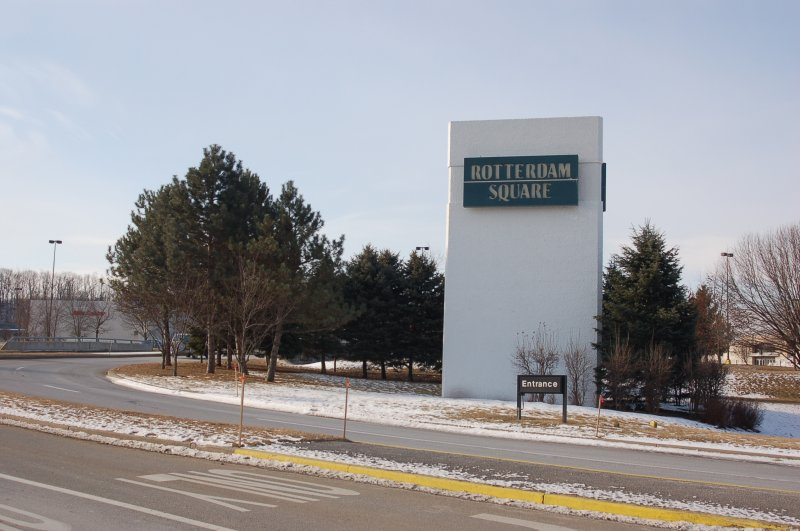
Entrance off West Campbell Road

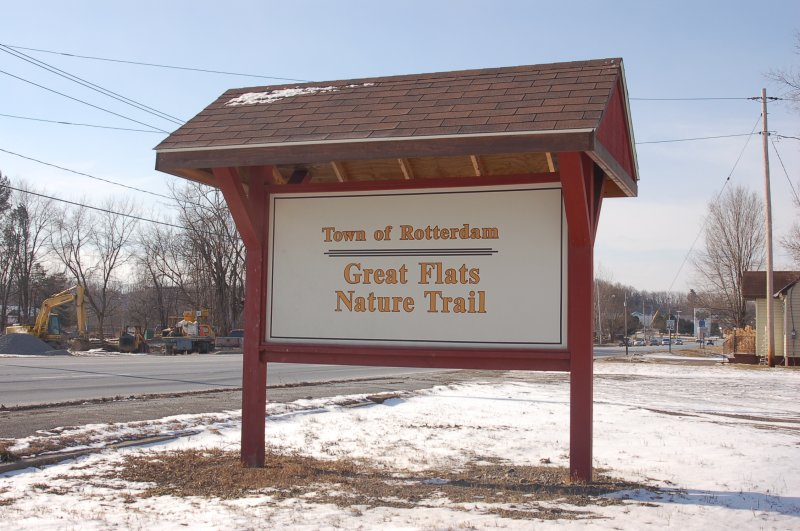
Great Flats entrance; the mall entrance can just be seen in the right hand background

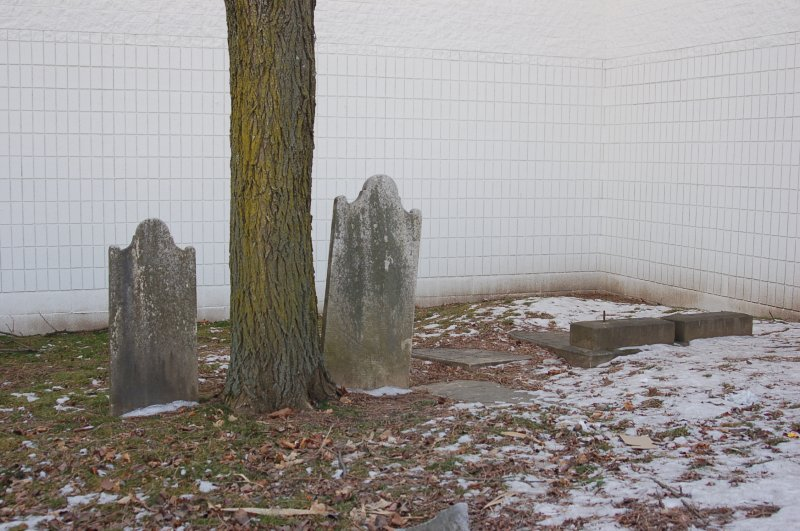
View of the graves

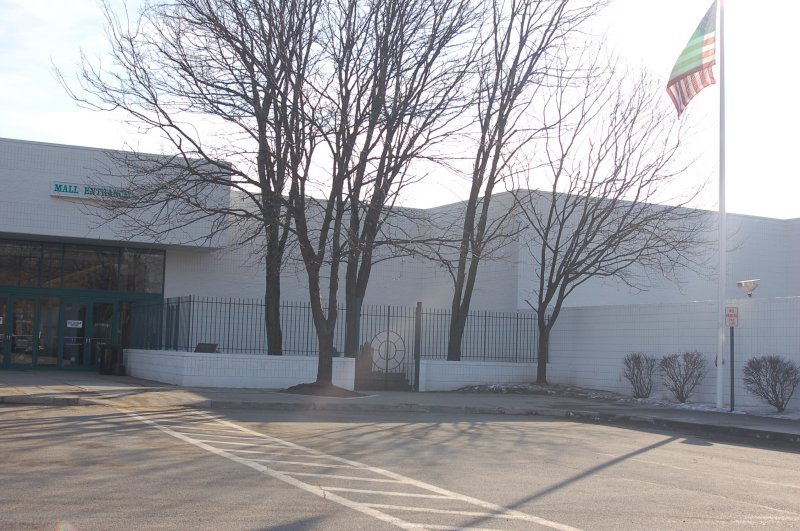
The location of the graveyard

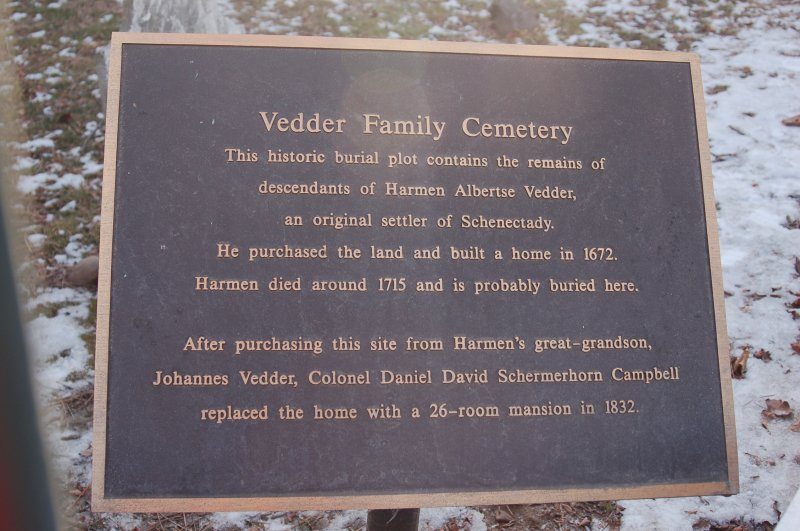
Inscription in the graveyard
