= Schenectady County, New York =

County in New York, United States

- County
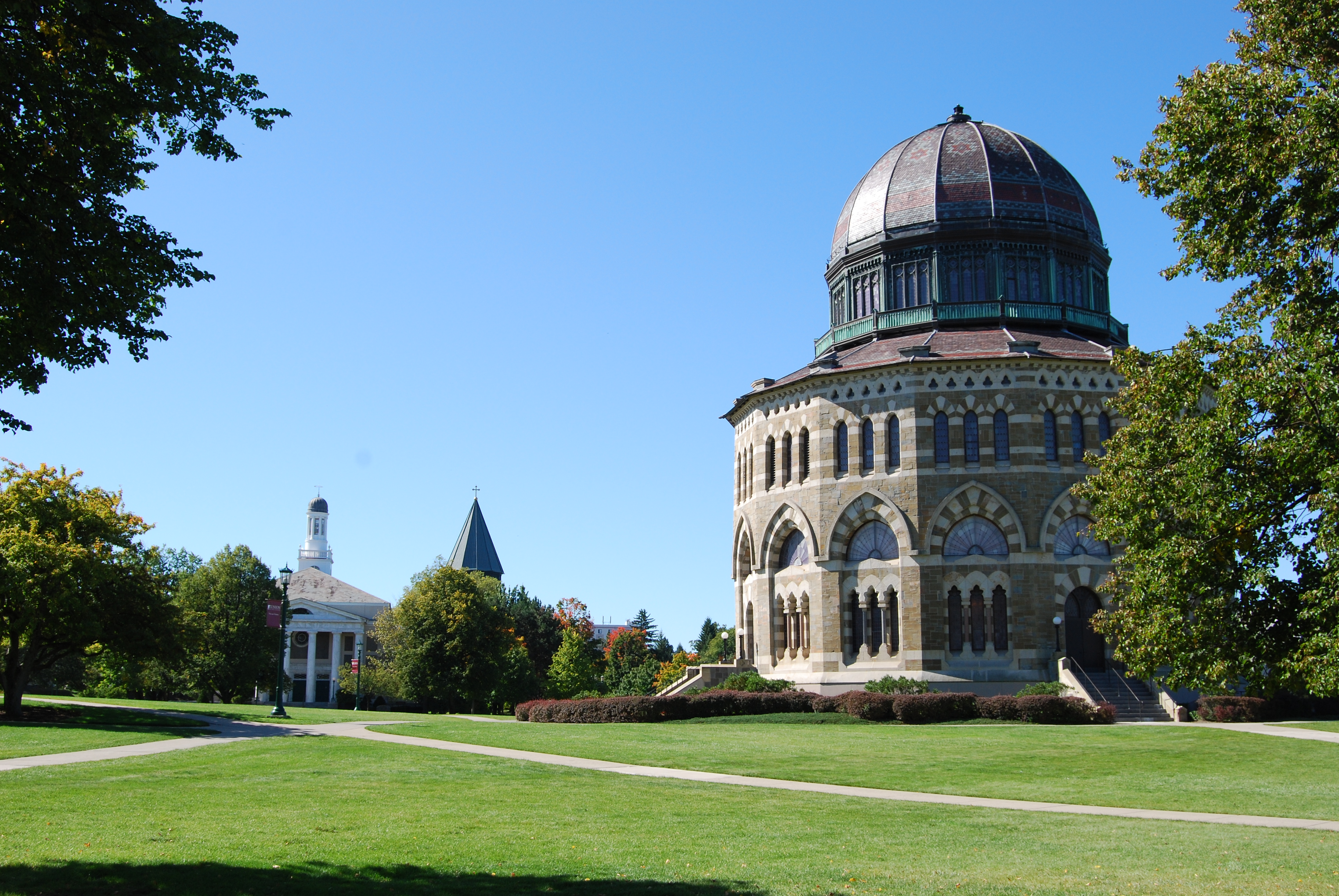
- The Nott Memorial

- Flag Seal

- Location within the U.S. state of New York
- Coordinates: 42°49′N 74°04′W
- Country: United States
- State: New York
- Founded: 1809
- Named for: Mohawk skahn-éht-ati, "beyond the pines"
- Seat: Schenectady
- Largest city: Schenectady

Area
  - Total: 209 sq mi (540 km^{2})
  - Land: 205 sq mi (530 km^{2})
  - Water: 4.9 sq mi (13 km^{2}) 2.3%

Population (2020)
  - Total: 158,061
  - Estimate (2025): 162,581 ▲
  - Density: 772.3/sq mi (298.2/km^{2})
- Time zone: UTC−5 (Eastern)
  - Summer (DST): UTC−4 (EDT)
- Congressional district: 20th
- Website: www.schenectadycountyny.gov

Schenectady County (/skəˈnɛktədi/) is a county in the U.S. state of New York. As of the 2020 census, the population was 158,061. The county seat is Schenectady. The name is from a Mohawk language word meaning "on the other side of the pine lands," a term that originally applied to Albany. The county is part of the Capital District region of the state.

Schenectady County is part of the Albany-Schenectady-Troy, NY Metropolitan Statistical Area, and is west of the confluence of the Mohawk with the Hudson River. It includes territory on the north and the south sides of the Mohawk River. Since 2020, the economy of Schenectady County and the entire Capital District has been directed toward artificial intelligence, AI-based photonics, quantum computing hardware manufacturing, nanotechnology, and digital electronics.

== History ==
This area of the river valley was historically occupied by the Mohawk people, the easternmost of the Five Nations comprising the Iroquois Confederacy or Haudenosaunee. They cultivated maize fields in the flats along the Mohawk River and had villages in the hills.

European settlement started in the present-day county by Dutch colonists in the 17th century; the village of Schenectady was founded in 1661. The fur traders in Albany kept a monopoly and prohibited settlers in Schenectady from the trade; those residents mostly became farmers. Other areas of the county were also developed for farming. The English enforced the Albany monopoly on the fur trade when they took over the New Netherland colony in 1664.

The English organized counties in the Province of New York in 1683; the area of the present-day Schenectady County was included in Albany County. Albany County contained an enormous area, including the northern part of New York State as well as all of the present State of Vermont and, in theory, extending westward to the Pacific Ocean. This county was reduced in size on July 3, 1766, by the creation of Cumberland County, and further on March 16, 1770, by the creation of Gloucester County, both containing territory now within the state of Vermont.

On March 12, 1772, Albany County was divided to form two other counties. The area of Schenectady County was still within the reduced Albany County.

From 1772 to 1786 Albany County included, besides the present territory of Albany County, all of the present Columbia, Rensselaer, Saratoga, and Schenectady counties, parts of the present Greene and Washington counties, and a piece of what is now southwestern Vermont.

In 1786 Albany County was reduced in size when Columbia County was organized; and again in 1791 by the splitting off of Rensselaer and Saratoga counties and the transfer of the Town of Cambridge to Washington County. It was further reduced in size in 1795 by the splitting off of a part that was combined with a portion of Otsego County to create Schoharie County. It was further reduced in size in 1800 by the splitting off of a part that was combined with a portion of Ulster County to create Greene County.

In 1809, Schenectady County was split from Albany County and has kept its current borders. The city of Schenectady was designated as the county seat and is the only city in the county. Major European immigration began in the mid-19th century, with the arrival of Irish refugees from the Great Famine. More immigrants were attracted to the city for its industrial jobs, including those from Italy and Poland. In the late 19th and early 20th centuries, the city became an industrial powerhouse and center of innovation, the headquarters of General Electric and other national corporations.

The city of Schenectady reached its peak of population in 1930 but the county reached its peak in 1970, according to US Census data (see table below for county data.) These differences reflect different settlement patterns and the development of suburban housing outside the city limits. The city of Schenectady lost many jobs and population in the late 20th century due to industrial and railroad restructuring; some people stayed in the county working at alternative positions, including commuting to the capital of Albany.

== Geography ==
According to the U.S. Census Bureau, the county has a total area of 209 square miles (540 km^{2}), of which 205 square miles (530 km^{2}) is land and 4.9 square miles (13 km^{2}) (2.3%) is water.

Schenectady County is located in east central New York State, northwest of Albany, an area usually considered "Upstate".

=== Adjacent counties ===
- Saratoga County - northeast
- Albany County - southeast
- Schoharie County - southwest
- Montgomery County - west

== Demographics ==
Historical population
Census	Pop.	Note	%±
1810	10,201		—
1820	13,081		28.2%
1830	12,347		−5.6%
1840	17,387		40.8%
1850	20,054		15.3%
1860	20,002		−0.3%
1870	21,347		6.7%
1880	23,538		10.3%
1890	29,797		26.6%
1900	46,852		57.2%
1910	88,235		88.3%
1920	109,363		23.9%
1930	125,021		14.3%
1940	122,494		−2.0%
1950	142,497		16.3%
1960	152,896		7.3%
1970	160,979		5.3%
1980	149,946		−6.9%
1990	149,285		−0.4%
2000	146,555		−1.8%
2010	154,727		5.6%
2020	158,061		2.2%
2025 (est.)	162,581	▲	2.9%
U.S. Decennial Census; 1790-1960 1900–1990; 1990-2000 2010-2020

=== 2020 census ===
Schenectady County, New York – Racial and ethnic composition Note: the US Census treats Hispanic/Latino as an ethnic category. This table excludes Latinos from the racial categories and assigns them to a separate category. Hispanics/Latinos may be of any race.
Race / Ethnicity (NH = Non-Hispanic)	Pop 1980	Pop 1990	Pop 2000	Pop 2010	Pop 2020	% 1980	% 1990	% 2000	% 2010	% 2020
White alone (NH)	142,372	138,428	126,538	119,409	104,878	94.95%	92.73%	86.34%	77.17%	66.35%
Black or African American alone (NH)	4,631	6,133	9,456	13,528	15,943	3.09%	4.11%	6.45%	8.74%	10.09%
Native American or Alaska Native alone (NH)	197	242	309	445	930	0.13%	0.16%	0.21%	0.29%	0.59%
Asian alone (NH)	1,022	1,783	2,862	4,917	8,281	0.68%	1.19%	1.95%	3.18%	5.24%
Native Hawaiian or Pacific Islander alone (NH)	x	x	38	81	130	x	x	0.03%	0.05%	0.08%
Other race alone (NH)	347	210	267	2,708	4,469	0.23%	0.14%	0.18%	1.75%	2.83%
Mixed race or Multiracial (NH)	x	x	2,446	4,812	10,925	x	x	1.67%	3.11%	6.91%
Hispanic or Latino (any race)	1,377	2,489	4,639	8,827	12,505	0.92%	1.67%	3.17%	5.70%	7.91%
Total	149,946	149,285	146,555	154,727	158,061	100.00%	100.00%	100.00%	100.00%	100.00%

=== 2010 census ===
As of the census of 2010, there were 154,727 people, 60,684 households, and 39,918 families residing in the county. The population density was 275/km^{2} (710/mi^{2}). There were 68,032 housing units at an average density of 122/km^{2} (320/mi^{2}). The racial makeup of the county was 79.77% White, 9.79% Black or African American, 0.23% Native American, 3.97% Asian, 0.03% Pacific Islander, 1.21% from other races, and 2.00% from two or more races. 6.17% of the population were Hispanic or Latino of any race. 24.3% were of Italian, 14.7% Irish, 8.7% German, 6.4% Polish, 4.0 Puerto Rican, 3.9% English ancestry according to Census 2010. 87.6% spoke English, 4.7% Spanish and 1.1% Italian as their first language.

There were 60,684 households, out of which 30.00% had children under the age of 18 living with them, 45.50% were married couples living together, 14.30% had a female householder with no husband present, and 36.30% were non-families. 30.60% of all households were made up of individuals, and 12.60% had someone living alone who was 65 years of age or older. The average household size was 2.58 and the average family size was 3.17.

In the county, the population was spread out, with 24.30% under the age of 18, 7.90% from 18 to 24, 28.10% from 25 to 44, 23.00% from 45 to 64, and 16.60% who were 65 years of age or older. The median age was 39 years. For every 100 females there were 92.60 males. For every 100 females age 18 and over, there were 88.30 males.

The median income for a household in the county was $53,399 ($41,739-2000), and the median income for a family was $57,670. Males had a median income of $41,840 versus $29,339 for females. The per capita income for the county was $24,992. About 7.80% of families and 11.90% of the population were below the poverty line, including 17.70% of those under age 18 and 5.50% of those age 65 or over.

== Government and politics ==
United States presidential election results for Schenectady County, New York
Year	Republican		Democratic		Third party(ies)	
Year	No.	%	No.	%	No.	%
1884	3,260	51.07%	2,977	46.64%	146	2.29%
1888	3,633	51.03%	3,328	46.75%	158	2.22%
1892	3,481	43.22%	4,081	50.66%	493	6.12%
1896	4,903	55.05%	3,711	41.66%	293	3.29%
1900	6,769	56.48%	4,783	39.91%	432	3.60%
1904	9,535	59.04%	5,981	37.03%	634	3.93%
1908	9,944	52.72%	7,129	37.80%	1,789	9.48%
1912	5,230	31.49%	5,345	32.19%	6,032	36.32%
1916	9,759	47.45%	8,962	43.58%	1,845	8.97%
1920	19,208	57.20%	8,741	26.03%	5,633	16.77%
1924	24,514	61.75%	9,167	23.09%	6,018	15.16%
1928	29,428	56.58%	21,277	40.91%	1,304	2.51%
1932	28,187	52.81%	22,230	41.65%	2,954	5.53%
1936	26,914	45.30%	31,027	52.23%	1,466	2.47%
1940	34,101	51.30%	32,041	48.20%	334	0.50%
1944	35,178	51.08%	33,397	48.49%	294	0.43%
1948	35,495	52.60%	28,225	41.82%	3,765	5.58%
1952	54,272	66.48%	27,157	33.27%	208	0.25%
1956	58,540	72.98%	21,673	27.02%	0	0.00%
1960	40,180	52.01%	37,003	47.90%	70	0.09%
1964	21,848	29.60%	51,892	70.30%	80	0.11%
1968	33,687	46.79%	34,786	48.31%	3,529	4.90%
1972	47,529	61.46%	29,619	38.30%	191	0.25%
1976	40,789	54.58%	31,838	42.60%	2,105	2.82%
1980	32,003	45.37%	29,932	42.44%	8,599	12.19%
1984	42,808	58.09%	30,612	41.54%	277	0.38%
1988	33,364	47.40%	36,483	51.83%	539	0.77%
1992	26,258	35.55%	32,335	43.77%	15,277	20.68%
1996	22,106	33.14%	35,404	53.07%	9,199	13.79%
2000	27,961	41.76%	35,534	53.07%	3,459	5.17%
2004	32,066	46.16%	35,971	51.78%	1,432	2.06%
2008	29,758	42.61%	38,611	55.28%	1,473	2.11%
2012	26,568	40.92%	36,844	56.74%	1,521	2.34%
2016	28,953	43.03%	33,747	50.16%	4,580	6.81%
2020	30,741	40.96%	42,465	56.58%	1,841	2.45%
2024	31,975	44.04%	39,733	54.72%	902	1.24%

Voters in Schenectady County have typically leaned Democratic since the mid-20th century. They have given small to moderate leads to Democrats since 1988 in presidential elections. The congressman Paul Tonko is a Democrat. Schenectady County is a statewide bellwether in presidential elections, as it has voted for the statewide presidential winner in every presidential election since 1980. This is the longest such streak of any county in the state. Legislative authority is vested in the County Legislature, which consists of 15 members representing 8 communities, separated into four districts. The current composition of the Legislature is as follows (10 Democrats, 2 Republicans, and 3 Conservatives who caucus with the Democrats):

District 1 - Schenectady:

- Richard Patierne (D)
- Richard Ruzzo (D)
- Margaret King (D)

District 2 - Schenectady:

- Philip Fields (D), deputy chair
- Gary Hughes (D), majority leader
- Jeffrey M. McDonald (D), vice chair

District 3 - Glenville, Niskayuna, and Scotia:

- Thomas Constantine (D)
- Cathy Gatta (D)
- Grant Socha (C)
- Sara Mae Pratt (D)
- Michelle Ostrelich (D)

District 4 - Duanesburg, Princetown, and Rotterdam:

- Anthony Jasenski (D), chair
- Brian McGarry (R), minority leader
- Randy Pascarella (C)
- Holly Vellano (C)

=== County government ===
Schenectady County was governed by an elected board of supervisors until 1966, after voters approved a new county charter under New York's home rule law.

On January 2, 1966, a board of representatives replaced the county supervisors. In 1987, a 15-member legislature replaced the board of representatives. The legislature hires a county manager to oversee day-to-day government operations.

Schenectady County managers
Name	Term
Theodore Birbilis	January 2, 1966 – December 31, 1967
Robert W. Williams	January 1, 1968 – June 30, 1968 (interim)
Carl F. Sanford	July 1, 1968 – November 30, 1977
Robert D. McEvoy	1978 – December 31, 2000
George A. Davidson	January 1, 2001 – February 10, 2002 (interim)
Kevin D. DeFebbo	February 11, 2002 – December 31, 2005
Kathleen A. Rooney	January 1, 2006 – June 6, 2019
Dr. Rory L. Fluman	June 7, 2019 – present

=== County services ===
The county operates the Schenectady County Public Library (SCPL), which consists of a central library and eight branches.

== Communities ==
=== Larger settlements ===
#	Location	Population	Type	Sector
1	†Schenectady	67,047	City	East
2	Rotterdam	22,968	CDP	East
3	Niskayuna	20,787	CDP	East
4	Scotia	7,729	Village	East
5	East Glenville	6,616	CDP	East
6	Mariaville Lake	722	CDP	West
7	Duanesburg	391	CDP	West
8	Delanson	377	Village	West
9	Duane Lake	323	CDP	West

† - County seat

=== Towns ===
- Duanesburg
- Glenville
- Niskayuna
- Princetown
- Rotterdam

=== Hamlets ===
- Alplaus
- Aqueduct
- Quaker Street

== See also ==
- List of counties in New York
- National Register of Historic Places listings in Schenectady County, New York
