= Prospect Mountain =

Prospect Mountain may refer to:

== Mountains ==
- Prospect Mountain (Alabama)
- Prospect Mountain (Alberta)
- Prospect Mountain (Conejos County, Colorado)
- Prospect Mountain (Lake County, Colorado)
- Prospect Mountain (Larimer County, Colorado)
- Prospect Mountain (Connecticut)
- Prospect Mountain (Idaho)
- Prospect Mountain (Minnesota)
- Prospect Mountain (Belknap County, New Hampshire), elevation 1,420 feet (430 m), southeast of New Durham, New Hampshire
- Prospect Mountain (Carroll County, New Hampshire), elevation 1,482 feet (452 m), east of Freedom, New Hampshire
- Prospect Mountain (Coos County, New Hampshire), elevation 2,204 feet (672 m), west of First Connecticut Lake
- Prospect Mountain (Grafton County, New Hampshire), elevation 2,064 feet (629 m), west of Squam Lake
- Prospect Mountain (Lancaster, New Hampshire), elevation 2,066 feet (630 m), located within the Weeks Estate
- Prospect Mountain (Nevada)
- Prospect Mountain (Broome County, New York)
- Prospect Mountain (Essex County, New York)
- Prospect Mountain (Orange County, New York)
- Prospect Mountain (Warren County, New York)
- Prospect Mountain (Oregon)
- Prospect Mountain (Vermont)
- Prospect Mountain (Wyoming)

== Other uses ==
- Prospect Mountain High School, in Alton, New Hampshire
- Prospect Mountain Veterans Memorial Highway, in Lake George, New York

== See also ==
- Mount Prospect (disambiguation)
