= New York State Route 17H =

New York State Route 17H may refer to:

- New York State Route 17H (1930–1937) in Cattaraugus County
- New York State Route 17H (1940s–1971) in Broome County
