= Mount Prospect =

Mount Prospect may refer to:

- Mount Prospect, Illinois, an incorporated village in Cook County, Illinois
  - Mount Prospect Public Library
  - Mount Prospect School District 57
  - Mount Prospect station, a railroad station
- Mount Prospect (Leggett, North Carolina), a historic house
- Mount Prospect Baptist Church, in Rock Hill, South Carolina
- Mount Prospect Methodist Church, in Richland, Arkansas
- Mount Prospect Park, in Brooklyn, New York
- Mount Prospect School for Boys, in Waltham, Massachusetts
- Mount Prospect Ski Tow, in Lancaster, New Hampshire

== See also ==
- Prospect Mountain (disambiguation)
- Prospect Hill (disambiguation)
