= New York State Route 363 =

State highway in Broome County, New York, US

North Shore Drive
- Map of the city of Binghamton in New York with NY 363 highlighted in red

Route information
- Maintained by NYSDOT
- Length: 1.38 mi (2.22 km)
- Existed: 1974–present

Major junctions
- South end: NY 434 / NY 992E in Binghamton
- US 11 in Binghamton
- North end: NY 7 in Binghamton

Location
- Country: United States
- State: New York
- Counties: Broome

Highway system
- New York Highways; Interstate; US; State; Reference; Parkways
← NY 362	→ NY 364

New York State Route 363 (NY 363) is a north–south expressway in the city of Binghamton, New York, in the United States. The highway is maintained by the New York State Department of Transportation (NYSDOT) and extends for 1.38 miles (2.22 km) through Downtown Binghamton. The southern terminus of the highway is at NY 434 and its northern terminus is at NY 7, where the right-of-way continues as the Brandywine Highway. The entire route is located within the city of Binghamton.

The entire route of NY 363, as well as NY 992E, an unsigned reference route which is a westward extension of the right-of-way to Washington Street and Riverside Drive (NY 990D) in the city of Binghamton, is also known as North Shore Drive.

== Route description ==
NY 363 begins at an interchange with NY 434 in Downtown Binghamton near the confluence of the Susquehanna and Chenango rivers, as a northern continuation of the right-of-way of NY 992E, an unsigned reference route connecting Riverside Drive (NY 990D), Washington Street, and Exchange Street in the city of Binghamton. The route, a limited-access extension of North Shore Drive, heads northeasterly along the north bank of the Susquehanna River and around the downtown district. While on the riverbank, NY 363 southbound connects to Susquehanna Street by way of an interchange. Due to the presence of the Susquehanna River south of the expressway, the onramps from NY 434 north and Susquehanna Street (via Carroll Street) to NY 363 north are actually located north of NY 363 southbound for a short distance (thus running anti-parallel to traffic on NY 363 southbound) before passing under NY 363 south and merging with NY 363 northbound on the left-hand side of the road.

Past Susquehanna Street, NY 363 continues along the Susquehanna River to a parclo interchange with U.S. Route 11 (US 11, Court Street) just east of Mirabito Stadium. Past US 11, the expressway leaves the riverbank and heads northward over the Norfolk Southern Railway's Southern Tier Line before merging with NY 7 (Brandywine Avenue) northbound. Here, NY 363 ends and the expressway continues north as Brandywine Highway, part of NY 7.

== History ==
The Brandywine Highway and North Shore Drive were constructed as one highway in the early 1960s, with North Shore Drive opened to traffic by 1965, initially being unnumbered. Brandywine Highway (north of Robinson Street) became the Brandywine Highway, a realignment of NY 7 upon the completion of the connected North Shore Drive/Brandywine Highway by 1968. North Shore Drive was designated as NY 363 on July 1, 1974.

== Exit list ==
The entire route is in Broome County. All exits are unnumbered.

Location	mi	km	Destinations	Notes
Binghamton	0.00	0.00	NY 434 / NY 992E (North Shore Drive) – Vestal	Southern terminus of NY 363; eastern terminus of NY 992E; Northbound entrance only from NY 434 East (State Street)
Binghamton			Carroll Street	Northbound entrance; closure pending as part of NY 434/NY 363 Gateway Project
Binghamton			Susquehanna Street	Southbound exit
Binghamton	0.84	1.35	US 11 (Court Street) / NY 7 south	NY 7 not signed southbound
Binghamton	1.38	2.22	NY 7 east (Brandywine Highway) to I-81 / I-86 / I-88 / NY 17	Southbound exit and northbound entrance; northern terminus of NY 363
Binghamton	1.000 mi = 1.609 km; 1.000 km = 0.621 mi: Incomplete access			
