= List of reference routes in New York =

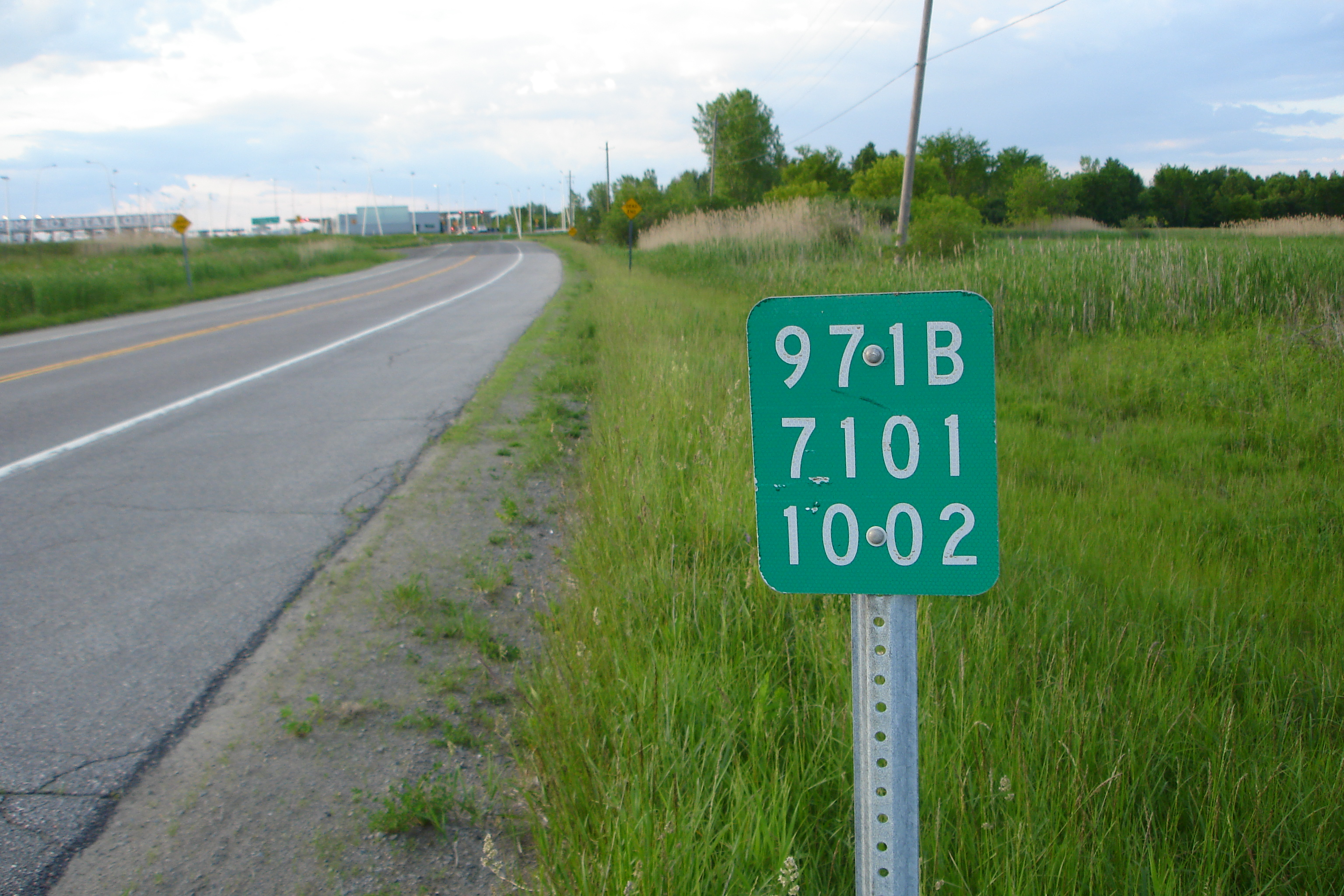
- Last reference marker on NY 971B northbound in Clinton County

Highway names
- Interstates: Interstate X (I-X)
- US Highways: U.S. Route X (US X)
- State: New York State Route X (NY X)
- County: County Route X (CR X)

System links
- New York Highways; Interstate; US; State; Reference; Parkways

A reference route is an unsigned highway assigned by the New York State Department of Transportation (NYSDOT) to roads that possess a signed name (mainly parkways), that NYSDOT has determined are too minor to have a signed touring route number, or are former touring routes that are still state-maintained. The majority of reference routes are owned by the state of New York and maintained by NYSDOT; however, some exceptions exist. The reference route designations are normally posted on reference markers, small green signs located every tenth-mile on the side of the road, though a few exceptions exist to this practice as well. These designations are not signed like other highways on normal reassurance marker road signs for drivers to see clearly, with four exceptions.

Reference route numbers are always three digit numbers in the 900s with a single alphabetic suffix. The designations are largely assigned in numerical and alphabetical order within a region, and designations are not reused once they are removed. Certain letters are avoided, such as "I" (used to indicate Interstate Highways and potential confusion with the number 1), "N" (used for institutional roads), "O" (potential confusion with the number 0), "R" (used for reservation roads), "S" (potential confusion with the number 5), "X" (a designation sometimes used in region 10), "Y", and "Z" (at the end of alphabet and not used). "Q" and "U" are not currently being assigned due to confusion in the past. Designations are assigned as follows:

- The first digit is 9, distinguishing the number as a reference route designation.
- The second digit corresponds to the NYSDOT region number the route is in, with regions 10 and 11 using the digit 0.
- The third digit is 6 for collector/distributor roads along limited access highways, 7–9 for parkways, and 0–5 for all other roads.

An older system of reference route numbering used numbers ranging from 800 to 999 without an alphabetic suffix. Some reference markers with these older numbers still exist, even though these reference routes have new numbers. Every road maintained by NYSDOT also has a state highway (SH) number, used in state laws.

== Region 1 ==
NYSDOT Region 1 primarily covers the Capital District, Saratoga–Champlain and Upper Hudson Valley areas. The counties comprising this region are Albany, Essex, Greene, Rensselaer, Saratoga, Schenectady, Warren, and Washington.

Route	Length (mi)	Length (km)	From	Via	To	Notes
910A	4.03	6.49	NY 32 (Elm Avenue)	Feura Bush and Glenmont roads (SH 367) in Bethlehem	NY 144 (River Road)	Former routing of NY 32
910B	1.92	3.09	NY 5 (Central Avenue)	Wolf Road (SH 69-1) in Colonie	Albany CR 151 (Albany Shaker Road), To NY 155/Albany International Airport, and I-87 exits 3&4	
910C	0.05	0.08	Albany city line	Broadway (SH 977) in Menands	NY 32 (Wolfert Avenue)	Former routing of NY 32
910D	3.30	5.31	NY 155 (Karner Road) in Albany	Washington Avenue Extension (SH 67-15)	I-90 eastbound Exit 2 in Albany	Extended from Fuller Road when that intersection was rebuilt as an interchange
910E	0.92	1.48	NY 85 / NY 140	New Scotland Road (SH 5237) in Bethlehem	Albany city line	Former number; still shown in the 2017 route log; former routing of NY 85
910F	1.18	1.90	US 20 (Western Avenue) in Guilderland	Fuller Road Alternate (SH 59-8 and SH 57-12)	I-87 / I-90 in Albany	
910G	1.03	1.66	Albany CR 354 / CR 362	Potter Hollow Road (SH 364) in Rensselaerville	NY 81 at NY 145	
910H	0.30	0.48	NY 143	Beckman Road in Westerlo	NY 32	Former number
910J	0.38	0.61	NY 443	Thacher Park Road (SH 5501) in Berne	NY 157A	
910K	0.61	0.98	I-87 exit 29	Blue Ridge Road (SH 8535) in North Hudson	US 9	
910L	4.11	6.61	NY 9N / NY 22	Bridge Road (SH 1796 and SH 9527) in Crown Point	Crown Point Bridge at Vermont state line (became Vermont Route 17)	Former number; formerly NY 903; now NY 185
910M	0.81	1.30	John Brown's Grave	John Brown Road (SH 1945) in North Elba	NY 73	
910P	0.36	0.58	US 9W	US 9W north ramps (SH 8482) in Catskill	NY 23	
910U	0.19	0.31	NY 385	Mansion Street Extension (SH 5198) in Coxsackie	US 9W	Former routing of US 9W
911E	0.21	0.34	NY 32 (Highland Avenue)	Lower Warren Street (SH 656) in Queensbury	NY 254 (Quaker Road)	
911F	2.23	3.59	Nott Street in Schenectady	Erie Boulevard and Freemans Bridge Road (SH 82-20 and SH 1172)	NY 50 in Glenville	
911G	0.34	0.55	NY 146 / NY 914T	Union Street (SH 1) in Niskayuna	NY 7	Formerly NY 950; former routing of NY 7
911H	0.98	1.58	NY 7 (Curry Road)	Altamont Avenue (SH 577B) in Rotterdam	Schenectady city line	Formerly NY 951; former routing of NY 7
911P	1.91	3.07	I-87 exit 8	Crescent Road (SH 9385) in Halfmoon	US 9	Formerly NY 819; previously NY 819 went from CR 47 in Rome via Rabbitt and Old Floyd roads to NY 365 in Floyd
911T	0.59	0.95	Pierce Road	Ushers Road (SH 9386) in Clifton Park	US 9	Formerly NY 822
911U	0.87	1.40	I-87 exit 11 in Malta	Round Lake Road (SH 9387)	US 9 in Round Lake	Former number; Formerly NY 823
911V	0.63	1.01	Austin Acres Road	Mohican Trail (SH 613) in Catskill	I-87 / Thruway exit 21	Continues in both directions as Greene CR 23B
912C	0.08	0.13	NY 156	Main Street (one block of SH 849) in Altamont	NY 146	
912E	0.08	0.13	NY 85A	Wye connection (SH 8461) in New Scotland	NY 155	Eliminated due to construction of a roundabout
912F	0.81	1.30	US 9 / US 20	Miller Road (SH 9394) in Schodack	Reno Road	Serves I-90 exit 10
912G	0.14	0.23	US 20 (Madison Avenue)	Grand Street (SH 67-1) in Albany	Market Street	
912M	6.59	10.61	I-87 / Thruway in Coeymans	Berkshire Connector (SH 56004, SH 56070, SH 56003, and SH 56001)	I-90 in Schodack	Maintained by the New York State Thruway Authority
912Q	0.65	1.05	I-87 exit 22	Ramp connection (SH 63-6) in Lake George	NY 9N	Connects I-87 with US 9 and NY 9N
912S	0.60	0.97	US 9W (McCarty Avenue)	Ramp connection (SH 62-4 and SH 62-3) in Albany	I-787 exit 1	
912T	0.08	0.13	NY 373	Wye connection (SH 1946) in Chesterfield	US 9	
912V	0.13	0.21	NY 146	Wye connection (SH 5721) in Clifton Park	NY 146A	Eliminated in 2019 due to construction of a roundabout
912W	1.32	2.12	NY 337 (Campbell Road) at I-890 exit 2	Rice Road (SH 641 and SH 1853) in Rotterdam	I-890 exit 4	Former extension of NY 5S
913B	0.06	0.10	NY 85	Wye connection (SH 1280) in Westerlo	NY 143	
913C	0.07	0.11	NY 157	Wye connection (SH 8244) in New Scotland	NY 85	
913D	0.05	0.08	NY 157	Wye connection (SH 5724) in Berne	NY 157A	
913E	0.03	0.05	NY 156	Wye connection (SH 978) in Knox	NY 157	
913G	0.07	0.11	NY 7 at I-890 exit 9	Curry Road (SH 9371) in Guilderland	East of I-890	
913H	0.10	0.16	US 9W / NY 32	Wye connection (SH 5499) in Bethlehem	NY 32	
913J	0.08	0.13	NY 32	Wye connection (SH 9101) in Bethlehem	US 9W	
913M	0.03	0.05	NY 30	Wye connection (SH 789) in Duanesburg	NY 159	
913P	0.05	0.08	NY 9P	Wye connection (SH 1528) in Stillwater	NY 423	Wye replaced by T-intersection before March 2022
913Q	0.73	1.17	Mount Van Hoevenberg	Bobsled Run Road (SH 67-17) in North Elba	NY 73	
913T	0.25	0.40	NY 32	Ramp connection (SH 68-2) in Menands	I-787 exit 6	
913V	0.78	1.26	Empire State Plaza	South Mall Arterial (SH 74-1, SH 67-2, and SH 67-12) in Albany	US 20	
914A	0.50	0.80	NY 22	Moses Road and Main Street (SH 5478) in Petersburg	NY 2	Two connecting roads; former routing of NY 2
914B	0.40	0.64	NY 337 (Campbell Road) at I-890 exit 2	Campbell Road Extension (SH 70-4) in Rotterdam	Old Rice Road	
914C	1.02	1.64	Washington Avenue	Ring Road ramps (SH 63-13) in Albany	Washington Avenue	Former number; still shown in the 2017 route log.
914D	0.23	0.37	NY 915D (Broadway) at I-890 exit 5	Broadway (SH 53-7) in Schenectady	Millard Street and Edison Avenue	
914E	0.25	0.40	Millard Street	Veeder Avenue (SH 63-6) in Schenectady	NY 5 (State Street)	
914F	0.10	0.16	US 20	Wye connection (SH 439) in Nassau	NY 66	
914H			I-787/NY 7	SH 69-6	Arch Street	Former number; now NY 787
914T	1.94	3.12	NY 5	Balltown Road (SH 9420) in Niskayuna	NY 146 / NY 911G	Reference markers show NY 546
914V	2.29	3.69	NY 50 in Glenville	Glenridge Road (SH 9421 and SH 9459)	NY 146 in Clifton Park	
915B	0.38	0.61	Hudson Avenue in Green Island	Green Island Bridge (SH 75-77)	US 4 in Troy	
915C	0.22	0.35	US 4 / NY 32 (Hudson Avenue) in Stillwater	Stillwater Bridge (SH 1791)	Rensselaer CR 125 at Canal Road in Schaghticoke	Former routing of NY 67
915D	0.16	0.26	NY 914D (Broadway) at I-890 exit 5	Broadway (SH 89-2) in Schenectady	Weaver Street	
915E	1.66	2.67	NY 151	3rd Avenue Extension (SH 5533) in East Greenbush	US 4	Former routing of NY 43
915F	0.32	0.51	I-87 exit 27	Vanderwalker Road (SH 65-10) in Schroon	US 9	
915G	1.19	1.92	NY 7	Bennington Bypass in Hoosick	Vermont state line (becomes Vermont Route 279)	
915H	1.39	2.24	I-87	New York State Thruway (SH 53002) in Albany	I-90	Maintained by the New York State Thruway Authority
915J	1.77	2.85	NY 911U near I-87 exit 11 in Malta	Round Lake Bypass (SH 9387 and SH 2006-3)	US 9 / NY 67 in Round Lake	Opened 2009
915K	0.19	0.31	US 9 / NY 22	Connector highway in Chesterfield	I-87 exit 33	Assigned between 2007 and 2009
915L	0.11	0.18	NY 85	Maher Road (SH 64-13) in Bethlehem	NY 910E	Former number; assigned between 2009 and 2012; still shown in the 2017 route log; former routing of NY 85
915M	0.47	0.76	Schenectady CR 69 at Tower Avenue	Chrisler Avenue (SH 60-9) in Rotterdam	I-890 / NY 7	Assigned between 2009 and 2012
915P	0.11	0.18	I-87 in Warrensburg	I-87 exit 24	Warren CR 10 (Schroon River Road) in Warrensburg	
915Q			US 20	SH 78-3 in Duanesburg	NY 7	I-88 exit 24 connection
917A	5.87	9.45	US 9	Prospect Mountain Veterans Memorial Highway (SH 66-1) in Lake George	Prospect Mountain	Maintained by the New York State Department of Environmental Conservation

== Region 2 ==
Region 2 primarily covers the Central, Mohawk Valley, and south-central Adirondack areas of New York. The counties comprising this region are Fulton, Hamilton, Herkimer, Madison, Montgomery, and Oneida.

Route	Length (mi)	Length (km)	From	Via	To	Notes
920A	0.06	0.10	NY 67	South East Avenue (SH 1375) in Johnstown	Johnstown city line	
920B	0.14	0.23	Fulton CR 140 at Yanney Road	SH 620 in Ephratah	NY 10	Former routing of NY 10; transferred to Fulton County
920C	0.26	0.42	Oakwood Avenue	Briggs Street (SH 52-1) in Johnstown	NY 30A	
920D	0.68	1.09	NY 29	Harrison Street (SH 544 and SH 56-19) in Johnstown	NY 30A	
920E	0.77	1.24	Gloversville city line	Easterly Street in Johnstown	Fulton CR 102 / CR 122	Ownership transferred to Fulton County; now extended CR 102
920H	0.20	0.32	NY 30	Bridge Street (SH 362) in Northampton	Northville village line	Former routing of NY 30
920J	2.09	3.36	Gloversville city line	Saratoga Boulevard and Steele Avenue (SH 1377) in Johnstown	NY 29	Former routing of NY 29A
920L				Old Route 5	NY 5	Former routing of NY 5
920M	0.83	1.34	NY 169	Fincks Basin Road	NY 169	Former routing of NY 169
920P	2.22	3.57	NY 30A in Fultonville	Riverside Drive (SH 5656A and SH 9467)	NY 5S in Glen	Former NY 862
920T	0.56	0.90	Midway between Maple and 3rd avenues	Moyer Street (SH 1763) in Canajoharie	Montgomery Street	Formerly part of NY 361; former NY 927
920V	2.80	4.51	NY 365 in Prospect	Prospect Street (SH 5345 and SH 5346)	NY 12 / NY 28 in Remsen	Formerly NY 28B
920W			NY 13	Lakeshore Road in Verona	NY 13	Former number; former routing of NY 13; gap in designation at Verona Beach State Park
921B	1.95	3.14	Main Street in New York Mills	Burrstone Road (SH 1943 and SH 72-3)	Bennett Street in Utica	Former routing of NY 31
921C	1.33	2.14	NY 5S	Genesee Street (SH 71-22, SH 65-18, and SH 62-12) in Utica	Herkimer Road	Former routing of NY 5 / NY 8 / NY 12
921D	0.72	1.16	NY 12 / NY 28	Mappa Avenue (SH 931) in Barneveld	NY 365	Former routing of NY 12 / NY 28; former NY 921
921E	1.06	1.71	NY 12	Genesee Street (SH 60-12, SH 250, and SH 5052) in New Hartford	Utica city line	Former routing of NY 5 / NY 12; former NY 922
921F	0.82	1.32	Utica city line	Barnes Avenue (SH 1517) in Marcy	Mohawk, Adirondack and Northern Railroad grade crossing	Former number; former NY 923
921G	0.13	0.21	NY 29	Mechanic Street (SH 464) in Salisbury	NY 29A	Wye connection; former NY 928
921K			Lakeshore Road	Forest Avenue in Verona	Spencer Avenue	Former number
921P	0.12	0.19	NY 5S	John Street (SH 71-22) in Utica	Broad Street	
921T	0.63	1.01	NY 8	Campion and Oxford roads and Mill Street (SH 66-6) in New Hartford	NY 8	
921V	0.02	0.03	NY 5 eastbound	Schuyler Street in Amsterdam	NY 5 westbound	Former number; now part of NY 5
921W	2.05	3.30	Utica city line	French Road, Champlin Avenue and Whitesboro Street (SH 9464) in Utica	NY 5A	
922A	1.92	3.09	NY 69 in Whitesboro	Mohawk Street (SH 9463)	NY 49 in Marcy	
922B	0.70	1.13	NY 5S in German Flatts	Washington Street (SH 9468)	NY 5 / NY 28 in Herkimer	
922C	0.07	0.11	Oneida CR 13	College Hill Road (SH 1610) in Kirkland	NY 233 / NY 412	
922E	1.24	2.00	NY 69 in Oriskany	River Street (SH 9528)	NY 49 in Marcy	
926A	1.27	2.04	NY 8 / NY 12 northbound in Utica	Horatio Street (SH 8N)	NY 8 / NY 12 northbound in Deerfield	

== Region 3 ==
Region 3 primarily covers the eastern Finger Lakes area. The counties comprising this region are Cayuga, Cortland, Onondaga, Oswego, Seneca, and Tompkins.

Route	Length (mi)	Length (km)	From	Via	To	Notes
930B	0.85	1.37	Onondaga Street	West Street Arterial (SH 62-7) in Syracuse	I-690 exit 11	
930C	0.78	1.26	West Street Arterial	Seymour and Adams streets (SH 62-7, SH 53-18, and SH 66-7) in Syracuse	I-81 exit 18	
930F	0.50	0.80	Ithaca city line	East Shore Drive (SH 454) in Ithaca	NY 34	Former routing of NY 34
930J	0.49	0.79	US 11	Bear Road (SH 57-7) in North Syracuse	South Bay Road	
930M	0.76	1.22	NY 298 in Salina	New Court Street (SH 672 and SH 672A)	Syracuse city line in DeWitt	Former number; formerly part of NY 433; now part of NY 598
930P	0.88	1.42	NY 5	Bridge Street (SH 70-2 and SH 68-4) in DeWitt	NY 290	
930Q	0.65	1.05	NY 281	Ramp connection (SH 62-13) in Cortlandville	I-81 exit 12	
930T	2.30	3.70	NY 5 in Camillus	SH 5016, SH 71-3, and SH 54-5	I-690 exit 6 in Geddes	Former number; now NY 695
930W	0.18	0.29	Camillus town line	West Genesee Street (SH 132) in Geddes	NY 5	Former routing of NY 5
931B	0.91	1.46	NY 297	State Fair Boulevard (SH 9425) in Geddes	I-690 exit 6	Formerly part of NY 48
931E	0.68	1.09	NY 326	Half Acre Road (SH 9470) in Aurelius	US 20 / NY 5	
931F	1.15	1.85	NY 321	Forward Road (SH 897) in Camillus	NY 174	Former routing of NY 321
931G	0.19	0.31	NY 370	Oswego Street (SH 5274) in Liverpool	Onondaga CR 91 at Tulip Street	Formerly part of NY 57
931H	0.22	0.35	US 11	Circle Drive (SH 69-5) in Cicero	Culvert east of NY 481 exit 10	
931J	0.16	0.26	NY 31	Pardee Road (SH 57-6) in Cicero	I-81 exit 30 northbound on-ramp	
931K	0.18	0.29	NY 481 southbound on-ramp	Soule Road (SH 69-5) in Clay	NY 31	
931L	0.26	0.42	US 11	South State Street (SH 64-7) in Syracuse	Brighton Avenue	
931M	0.21	0.34	Teall Avenue	Arterial Road (SH 672A) in Salina	NY 298	
931P	0.14	0.23	Ramp to NY 690 southbound	Sorrell Hill Road (SH 8496) in Van Buren	NY 31	
936A	1.58	2.54	US 11 in Salina	I-81 northbound service road (SH 81IN)	East Taft Road in Cicero	
936B	1.55	2.49	East Taft Road in Cicero	I-81 southbound service road (SH 81IS)	US 11 in Salina	
936C	0.90	1.45	Syracuse east city line	I-690 eastbound service road (SH 690IE) in East Syracuse	Bridge Street	
936D	0.87	1.40	Bridge Street	I-690 westbound service road (SH 690IW) in East Syracuse	Syracuse east city line	
936E	0.49	0.79	Hiawatha Boulevard	I-81 northbound service road (SH 81IN) in Syracuse	NY 370 westbound	
936F	0.80	1.29	Ramp to I-81 southbound	I-81 southbound service road (SH 81IS) in Syracuse	NY 298 westbound	

== Region 4 ==
Region 4 primarily covers the western Finger Lakes and Genesee Valley areas. The counties comprising this region are Genesee, Livingston, Monroe, Ontario, Orleans, Wayne, and Wyoming.

Route	Length (mi)	Length (km)	From	Via	To	Notes
940D	0.24	0.39	NY 15A	Wye connection (SH 1868) in Mendon	West Main Street	
940G	1.74	2.80	NY 252	East River Road (SH 1367) in Brighton	Rochester city line	Designation removed November 26, 2007; now part of Monroe CR 84
940H	1.18	1.90	Livingston County line (becomes CR 84)	River Road (SH 5507) in Wheatland	NY 251	Formerly part of NY 35
940J	1.62	2.61	NY 15A in Mendon	Monroe Street (SH 575 and SH 1803)	NY 65 in Honeoye Falls	Designated NY 363 from c. 1932 to the late 1950s
940K	3.96	6.37	NY 33	Mount Read Boulevard (SH 57-10, SH 50-5, SH 53-3P, SH 50-4, and SH 53-4P) in Rochester	Joanne Drive	
940L	2.37	3.81	NY 33A	Howard Road (SH 9350) in Gates	NY 31	Formerly part of NY 47
940M	2.18	3.51	Lyell Avenue	Lake Avenue (SH 48-5) in Rochester	NY 104	
940P	1.03	1.66	NY 386	Spencerport Expressway (SH 61-7) in Gates	I-490	Former number; now part of NY 531
940T	1.82	2.93	I-490 exit 13	Inner Loop (SH 71-7, SH 70-1, SH 70-2, SH 60-7, SH 63-23, and SH 56-3) in Rochester	North Union Street	
940U	0.88	1.42	I-490 exit 24	West Commercial Street (SH 56-9 and SH 64-7) in East Rochester	NY 153	
941A	1.24	2.00	NY 18	Latta Road (SH 399) in Greece	Rochester city line	
941B	0.65	1.05	Rochester city line	Empire Boulevard (SH 98) in Irondequoit	NY 404 at NY 590 exit 8	Formerly part of US 104
941C	0.33	0.53	Ontario CR 25	Outlet Road in Phelps	NY 88	Designation removed c. 2004; now part of CR 25
941D	1.14	1.83	Ontario CR 32 at Hickox Road	Bristol Road (SH 187) in Canandaigua	NY 21	Designation removed between 2004 and 2007; now part of CR 32
941E	1.14	1.83	NY 245	SH 203 in Gorham	Ontario CR 18 northwest of NY 245	Designation removed between 2004 and 2007; now part of CR 18
941F	0.52	0.84	Ontario CR 24 / CR 29	South Street (SH 662) in Gorham	NY 245	Designation removed between 2004 and 2007; now part of CR 24
941G	0.47	0.76	US 20 / NY 5	Pre-Emption Road and Washington Street (SH 333) in Geneva	Geneva city line	Designation removed between 2004 and 2007; Pre-Emption Road portion now part of Ontario CR 6
941H	0.04	0.06	NY 245	Blodgett Road (SH 662) in Gorham	NY 247	Wye connection; designation removed between 2004 and 2007; now Ontario CR 50
941K	0.13	0.21	NY 63 in Geneseo	Court Street (SH 49-11)	Lower Court in Geneseo	
941L	5.66	9.11	Irondequoit Bay Outlet	Lake Road (SH 573) in Webster	NY 250	Former extension of NY 18; designation removed November 26, 2007; now part of Monroe CR 1
941M	0.22	0.35	NY 98	Roosevelt Highway (SH 1926) in Carlton	NY 18	Wye connection
941P	2.17	3.49	NY 360	Redman Road (SH 286) in Hamlin	Cook Road	Formerly NY 215; designation removed November 26, 2007; now part of Monroe CR 236
941V	2.23	3.59	Rochester city line	Blossom Road (SH 408)	NY 286 in Penfield	Formerly NY 286A
942B	0.17	0.27	NY 441	Washington Street (SH 1337) in Penfield	Monroe CR 270 at bridge over Irondequoit Creek	Designation removed November 26, 2007; now part of CR 270
942D	0.43	0.69	NY 63	Mary Jemison Drive (SH 49-11) in Geneseo	US 20A / NY 39	Connection for NY 63 south to US 20A / NY 39 east
942G	0.51	0.82	I-490 exit 14	Plymouth Avenue (SH 54-15 and SH 52-12) in Rochester	Inner Loop	
942J	0.02	0.03	NY 251	Wye connection (SH 8223) in Victor	NY 96	Designation removed between 2004 and 2007
942T	0.14	0.23	Lakeshore Drive	South Main Street (SH 49-7) in Canandaigua	US 20 / NY 5 / NY 21 / NY 332	Former routing of US 20 / NY 5
942W	0.47	0.76	US 20 / NY 5	West Avenue (SH 5576) in Canandaigua	Canandaigua city line	Former routing of US 20 / NY 5; designation removed between 2004 and 2007
943A	0.44	0.71	US 20 / NY 5 / NY 21	Bristol Road (SH 187) in Canandaigua	Canandaigua city line	Former routing of NY 21; designation removed between 2004 and 2007
943B	1.52	2.45	NY 31 (Redman Road)	West Avenue (SH 5425) in Brockport	NY 19	Former routing of NY 31; designation removed November 26, 2007; now Monroe CR 281
943C	1.68	2.70	NY 65	Calkins Road (SH 497) in Pittsford	NY 64	Former extension of NY 253
943E	0.97	1.56	NY 253	Erie Station Road (SH 1499A) in Henrietta	NY 15	Former routing of NY 253
943F	0.35	0.56	Lake Ontario State Parkway at Lake Avenue in Rochester	Colonel Patrick O'Rorke Memorial Bridge	Thomas Avenue in Irondequoit	Assigned November 26, 2007
946A	1.87	3.01	Clinton Avenue in Rochester	NY 104 eastbound service road (SH 104E)	Goodman Street in Irondequoit	Assigned between 2004 and 2007
946B	2.64	4.25	Culver Road in Irondequoit	NY 104 westbound service road (SH 104W)	Clinton Avenue in Rochester	Assigned between 2004 and 2007
946C	2.27	3.65	Five Mile Line Road	NY 104 eastbound service road (SH 104E) in Webster	NY 250	Assigned between 2004 and 2007
946D	2.28	3.67	NY 250	NY 104 westbound service road (SH 104W) in Webster	Five Mile Line Road	Assigned between 2004 and 2007
946E	1.10	1.77	Manitou Road	NY 531 eastbound service road (SH 531E) in Gates	NY 386	Assigned between 2004 and 2007
946F	1.10	1.77	NY 386	NY 531 westbound service road (SH 531W) in Gates	Manitou Road	Assigned between 2004 and 2007
947A	35.06	56.42	Lakeside Beach Road in Carlton	Lake Ontario State Parkway (SH 69-2, SH 70-3, SH 69-1, SH 50-2, SH 49-1, SH 49-2, SH 51-3, SH 52-2, SH 53-5, SH 55-1, SH 58-4, and SH C58-25)	Lake Avenue in Rochester	Maintained by the New York State Department of Transportation (partially under New York State Office of Parks, Recreation and Historic Preservation jurisdiction)
948A	0.55	0.89	NY 18	Lakeside Beach Road (SH 69-2) in Carlton	Lakeside Beach State Park access road	Maintained by the New York State Office of Parks, Recreation and Historic Preservation

== Region 5 ==
Region 5 primarily covers the Niagara Frontier and southwestern New York. The counties comprising this region are Cattaraugus, Chautauqua, Erie, and Niagara.

Route	Length (mi)	Length (km)	From	Via	To	Notes
950A	12.71	20.45	Pennsylvania state line in South Valley	Brown Run and West Bank Perimeter roads (SH 65-1, SH 67-1, SH 65-2, SH 64-2, and SH 68-1)	NY 394 at I-86 / NY 17 exit 17 in Coldspring	
950B	0.51	0.82	West State Street	North State Street (SH 40-2) in Salamanca	NY 353	Former number; concurrent with Cattaraugus CR 94 north of Salamanca city line
950C	1.51	2.43	NY 266	Grand Island Boulevard (SH 9333) in Tonawanda	NY 324	Eastbound only. Former routing of NY 324
950D	1.22	1.96	US 20	Shortman Road (SH 62-8) in Ripley	NY 5	Serves I-90 / Thruway exit 61
950E	0.32	0.51	NY 5 / NY 384	Church and Division streets (SH 75-33 and SH 69-8) in Buffalo	Elm Street	Overlaps NY 5
950H	2.87	4.62	I-290 exit 2 in Tonawanda	Twin Cities Memorial Highway (SH 63-3, SH 67-23, and SH 67-24)	Wheatfield Street in North Tonawanda	Former number; now part of NY 425
950J	0.22	0.35	NY 75	Camp Road (SH 1067) in Hamburg	NY 5	Former routing of NY 75
950K	1.56	2.51	Buffalo city line	Niagara Falls Boulevard (SH 5193) on Tonawanda–Amherst town line	US 62 / NY 324	
950M	0.69	1.11	Buffalo city line	Potters Road (SH 9219) in West Seneca	NY 240	Former routing of NY 240
950U	0.23	0.37	Maryland Avenue	Highland Avenue (SH 58-24) in Niagara Falls	NY 61	
951A	2.80	4.51	NY 384 in Niagara Falls	LaSalle Expressway (SH 68-2, SH 67-15, and SH 67-1)	Williams Road in Wheatfield	
951B	0.40	0.64	NY 31	Walnut Street (SH 56-18) in Lockport	Pound Street	
951C	1.09	1.75	NY 60 / NY 394	Washington Street (SH 61-10) in Jamestown	Fluvanna Avenue	Designation removed; now NY 430
951E	0.58	0.93	US 62	Big Tree Road (SH 1586) in Hamburg	US 20 / US 20A	
951H	0.34	0.55	U.S. Customs Plaza	Connector from the customs plaza to I-190 (SH 69-1) in Buffalo	I-190	
951J	0.57	0.92	Massachusetts Avenue	Ramp connection (SH 69-1) in Buffalo	I-190 / Thruway southbound	Maintained by New York State Thruway Authority
951K	0.26	0.42	NY 5 east	Ramp connection (SH 66-1) in Buffalo	I-190 / Thruway northbound	
951L	0.42	0.68	I-190 / Thruway northbound	Ramp connection (SH THUWY and SH 69-1) in Buffalo	NY 266	
951M	1.07	1.72	Allegany State Park Route 1 at Salamanca city line	Parkway Drive (SH 55-11) in Salamanca	I-86 / US 219 / NY 17 exit 21	
951T	9.43	15.18	NY 394 in Coldspring	Allegheny Reservoir service road (SH 8328, SH 8308, and SH 54-5)	NY 417 in Salamanca	Formerly part of NY 17; gap in designation in Red House
951V	2.08	3.35	NY 16 / NY 400	Olean Road (SH 5317) in Aurora	NY 16 at NY 400	Former routing of NY 16
952A	3.22	5.18	Buffalo city line	Genesee Street (SH 1212) in Cheektowaga	NY 33	Formerly part of NY 33B
952B	0.09	0.14	Niagara Scenic Parkway	John B. Daly Boulevard (SH 75-5) in Niagara Falls	NY 384	
952G	0.44	0.71	NY 384	Church Street (SH 75-33 and SH 54-2) in Buffalo	I-190 / Thruway exit 7	
952H	0.05	0.08	NY 5	Central Avenue (SH 9240) in Silver Creek	US 20	Former routing of NY 5; part of US 20 Truck
952J	1.06	1.71	Erie CR 44 at CR 463	New Armor Duells Road (SH 72-1) in Orchard Park	NY 240 / NY 277	
952M	1.08	1.74	I-86 / NY 17 exit 16	West Main Street (SH 9400) in Randolph	NY 394	
952P	7.64	12.30	Pennsylvania state line in Busti	Forest Avenue (SH 9407 and SH 9408)	NY 60 in Jamestown	
952Q	14.05	22.61	Buffalo city line in Cheektowaga	Walden Avenue (SH 9411)	NY 33 in Alden	Longest non-parkway reference route
952T	2.25	3.62	Erie CR 171 at CR 192	Sweet Home Road (SH 82-12 and SH 9409) in Amherst	Erie CR 301 at CR 232	
952V	1.95	3.14	NY 265 / NY 384 in Wheatfield	Williams Road (SH 9431)	US 62 in Niagara Falls	
952W	0.45	0.72	NY 417	West Five Mile Road (SH 9401) in Allegany	I-86 / NY 17 exit 24	
953A	0.21	0.34	I-86 / NY 17 exit 15	School House Road (SH 66-4) in Randolph	NY 394	
953B	0.43	0.69	NY 430	Strunk Road (SH 69-6) in Jamestown	I-86 / NY 17 exit 11	
953C	0.37	0.60	NY 16	Ramp connection (SH 56-4) in West Seneca	NY 400	
954D	0.95	1.53	NY 16	Oak and Elm streets (SH 77-25) in Buffalo	NY 33	
954E	0.49	0.79	Reed Street	Buffalo Street (SH 8010) in Olean	I-86 / NY 17 exit 25	
954F	0.51	0.82	I-990 exit 1	Ramp connector (SH 81-2) in Amherst	SUNY Buffalo North Campus	
954G	6.13	9.87	US 20A / NY 78 in Wales	Two Rod Road (SH 9412, SH 5635, and SH 529)	NY 354 in Marilla	Part is former NY 358
954J	1.73	2.78	NY 430	Southern Tier Expressway spur (SH 73-7) in Ellery	I-86 / NY 17 exit 10	Former routing of NY 17
954K	1.11	1.79	NY 394	McDaniel Avenue and Third Street (SH 86-7 and SH 86-4) in Jamestown	NY 60	
954L	3.11	5.01	Washington Street	Broadway (SH 86-8 and SH 92-3) in Buffalo	Fillmore Avenue	Formerly part of NY 130
954M	3.47	5.58	Lockport city line in Lockport	Akron Road (SH 749)	NY 93 in Royalton	Former routing of NY 93; designation removed October 1, 1998; now CR 142; 2017 route log still shows NY 954M as a current route.
954P	0.53	0.85	Niagara Scenic Parkway	Upper Mountain Road (SH 60-2) in Lewiston	NY 265	
954T	0.57	0.92	I-86 / US 219 / NY 17 exit 23	SH 8018 and SH 8144 in Carrollton	NY 417	Former routing of US 219; part of US 219 Business
954V	0.85	1.37	NY 384	Rainbow Blvd and 1st Street (SH 75-4 and SH 73-4)	NY 104	
955A	0.19	0.31	Canada–US border	Rainbow Bridge in Niagara Falls	NY 384	Maintained by Niagara Falls Bridge Commission
955B	0.19	0.31	Canada–US border	Peace Bridge in Buffalo	Peace Bridge customs plaza	Maintained by Peace Bridge Authority
955C	0.13	0.21	Canada–US border	Whirlpool Rapids Bridge in Niagara Falls	NY 182	Maintained by Niagara Falls Bridge Commission
957A	19.20	30.90	LaSalle Expressway in Niagara Falls	Niagara Scenic Parkway (SH PKWAY and SH RAMP)	NY 18 in Porter	Maintained by New York State Parks Department
957B	2.29	3.69	West River Road	South Parkway (SH 35-2 and SH 35-1) on Grand Island	I-190 / Thruway	Maintained by New York State Parks Department
957C	8.48	13.65	South Parkway	West River Parkway (SH 49-1 and SH 51-3) on Grand Island	I-190 / Thruway	Maintained by New York State Parks Department
958A	1.20	1.93	Niagara Scenic Parkway	Spur to Fort Niagara (SH 65-2) in Porter	Fort Niagara State Park	Maintained by New York State Parks Department

== Region 6 ==
Region 6 primarily covers the western and central portions of the Southern Tier. The counties comprising this region are Allegany, Chemung, Schuyler, Steuben, and Yates. Reference routes for Tioga County are also listed here, as Tioga County was in Region 6 until August 2007.

Route	Length (mi)	Length (km)	From	Via	To	Notes
960B	0.78	1.26	University Street	North Main Street (SH 1654) in Alfred	NY 244	Former NY 856
960D			Steuben County line	Sagetown Road in Southport	NY 328	Former number; former routing of NY 328; now Chemung CR 78
960H	0.22	0.35	NY 96	Mill Street (SH 5471) in Candor	NY 96B	In Region 9; former routing of NY 96B
960J	0.73	1.17	NY 434	NY 17 exit 65 connection (SH 65-3 and SH 66-3) in Owego	NY 17C	In Region 9
960M	0.31	0.50	NY 415 in Erwin	Meads Creek Road (SH 9380)	I-86 / NY 17 exit 42 in Campbell	Former NY 960
960Q	0.70	1.13	NY 352	Madison Avenue in Elmira	Washington Avenue	Former number; formerly part of NY 13
960U	0.74	1.19	I-86 / NY 17 exit 39	Babcock Hollow Road (SH 69-2) in Bath	NY 415	Former routing of NY 15; formerly NY 866
961A	0.16	0.26	NY 17 exit 59 / NY 427	Wyncoop Creek Road (SH 67-4) in Chemung	Chemung CR 3 at CR 60	
961B	0.14	0.23	Pennsylvania state line	Wilawana Road (SH 1764) in Chemung	NY 427	Former routing of NY 427
961F	5.89	9.48	NY 70 in Burns	West Avenue (SH 1366 and SH 5532)	NY 36 in Arkport	Former routing of NY 70; signed as a touring route
961G	0.08	0.13	NY 244	Hamilton Hill Road (SH 5502) in Alfred	NY 21	
961H	0.37	0.60	NY 54	Extension of Hopeton Road (SH 1721) in Torrey	NY 14	
961J	0.54	0.87	NY 415	Michigan Hollow Road (SH 73-3) in Avoca	Kanona Road	
961K	0.80	1.29	NY 427	Maple Avenue (SH 355) in Elmira	Elmira city line	Former number; former routing of NY 427; now Chemung CR 85
961L	0.09	0.14	Steuben County line (becomes CR 87)	Hammondsport–Wayne Road (SH 1684) in Tyrone	NY 230	Former routing of NY 230
961M	0.18	0.29	NY 14	Clemens Center Parkway (SH 80-2) in Elmira	Grand Central Avenue	
961P	1.85	2.98	NY 414 in Corning city	Southern Tier Expressway	NY 17 / NY 961Q in Corning	Former number; now part of I-86
961Q	0.12	0.19	I-86 / NY 17 exit 47	SH 82-22 in Corning	NY 352	
961T	0.43	0.69	NY 352	SH 55-5 in Corning	I-86 / NY 17 exit 48	Former routing of NY 17
962A	0.50	0.80	NY 21	Karr Valley Road (SH 70-14) in Almond	I-86 / NY 17 exit 33	
962B	0.28	0.45	Steuben CR 70A	Mill Road (SH 69-4) in Howard	Steuben CR 70 at Miller and Smith Pond Roads	
962C	0.33	0.53	NY 14A	SH 5334 in Reading	NY 14	
962D	0.50	0.80	I-390 exit 2	Loon Lake Road (SH 74-1) in Cohocton	NY 415	Formerly part of NY 371
962E	0.70	1.13	I-86 / NY 17 exit 52A	Extension of Chemung CR 64 (SH 69-3) in Horseheads	NY 14	
962F	0.38	0.61	NY 14	Extension of NY 962E (SH 69-3) in Horseheads	Lackawanna Avenue	
962G	0.31	0.50	NY 434	Halstead and Lackawanna avenues (SH 66-3) in Owego	NY 17 exit 64	In Region 9
962J	0.41	0.66	NY 434	SH 2000-3 in Owego	NY 17C	In Region 9; serves NY 17 exit 66; signed as a touring route

== Region 7 ==
Region 7 primarily covers the North Country and the northern portion of the Adirondacks. The counties comprising this region are Clinton, Franklin, Jefferson, Lewis, and St. Lawrence.

Route	Length (mi)	Length (km)	From	Via	To	Notes
970B	0.95	1.53	NY 37 / NY 420	Main Street (SH 5467) in Massena	NY 37B	Former extension of NY 420
970C	1.42	2.29	NY 37 / NY 56	Andrews Street (SH 8100 and SH 1631) in Massena	Main Street (970B)	Former extension of NY 56
970E	0.50	0.80	NY 812 in Oswegatchie	State Street (SH 1388 and SH 67-29)	NY 68 in Ogdensburg	Formerly part of NY 87
970F	0.08	0.13	NY 374	SH 776 in Plattsburgh	NY 3	Former routing of NY 374; provides access from NY 374 eastbound to NY 3
970G	0.25	0.40	NY 3	Eastbound ramp connection (SH 69-2) in Plattsburgh	NY 374	
970H	0.41	0.66	NY 374	Westbound ramp connection (SH 69-2) in Plattsburgh	NY 3	
970J	0.03	0.05	NY 12D	McAlpine Street (SH 9317) in Lyons Falls	Mohawk, Adirondack and Northern Railroad crossing	Formerly part of NY 337
970K	0.33	0.53	Ramp from I-81 southbound	Old Rome State Road (SH 9374) in Watertown	NY 232	
970M	.46	0.74	NY 195	Stockholm–Lawrence Road in Lawrence	US 11	Decommissioned.
971G	0.56	0.90	NY 37	Rooseveltown traffic circle (SH 1861) in Massena	NY 37	Eliminated between 2009 and 2012 as part of redesign of Seaway International Bridge approach
970T	0.98	1.58	NY 37	Water Street (SH 9393) in Fort Covington	Canada–US border (becomes Quebec Route 132)	
971A	0.57	0.92	NY 37 / NY 812	Ford Street (SH 57-16) in Ogdensburg	Greene Street	Former routing of NY 37
971B	0.46	0.74	US 9 at I-87 exit 43 northbound ramps	East Service Road (SH 46-2) in Champlain	Cul-de-sac at Canada–US border	Formerly part of US 9
971D	0.58	0.93	NY 421	Mountain Camp Road in Piercefield	Warren Point	Former number; former routing of NY 421
971G	0.56	0.90	NY 37	Rooseveltown traffic circle (SH 1861) in Massena	NY 37	Eliminated between 2009 and 2012 as part of redesign of Seaway International Bridge approach
971H	0.16	0.26	NY 12F in Hounsfield	Bridge Street (SH 9439)	NY 12E in Brownville	Former number
971J	0.12	0.19	NY 131	SH 5536 in Massena	St. Lawrence CR 43	Wye connection; former routing of NY 131
971K	0.49	0.79	NY 12 / NY 26	Church, James, and Market streets (SH 5304) in Alexandria Bay	Fuller Street	
971L	0.04	0.06	NY 190	SH 8480 in Ellenburg	US 11	Former routing of NY 190
971P	0.78	1.26	0.12-mile (0.19 km) west of I-81 exit 43 southbound ramps	Kellogg Hill Road (SH 57-2) in Adams	US 11	
971Q	0.22	0.35	US 11	Fort Drum Memorial Drive (SH 87-1) in Le Ray	East end of bridge over CSX Transportation rail line	
971T	0.08	0.13	NY 56	Park Street (SH 9389) in Potsdam	US 11	
971U	0.52	0.84	US 11	Maple Street (SH 5308) in Potsdam	NY 56	Former routing of US 11
971V	0.90	1.45	Fort Drum Gate 1	SH 9436 in Rutland	NY 3	
972A	0.63	1.01	I-87 exit 43 southbound ramps	West Service Road (SH 46-2) in Champlain	Cul-de-sac at Canada–US border	
972B	0.29	0.47	I-87 exit 37	Ramp connection (SH 58-23) in Plattsburgh	NY 3	
972C	0.95	1.53	NY 972E at St. Lawrence CR 45	Seaway International Bridge in Massena	Canada–US border	Former number; Maintained by Seaway International Bridge Corporation
972D	0.40	0.64	US 9	West Service Road (SH 46-2) in Champlain	I-87 exit 43 southbound ramps	
972E	0.04	0.06	NY 37	Seaway International Bridge approach (SH 1861)	NY 972C at St. Lawrence CR 45	Assigned between 2009 and 2012 as part of redesign of Seaway International Bridge approach

== Region 8 ==
Region 8 primarily covers the Middle and Lower Hudson Valley. The counties comprising this region are Columbia, Dutchess, Orange, Putnam, Rockland, Ulster, and Westchester.

Route	Length (mi)	Length (km)	From	Via	To	Notes
980B	0.35	0.56	US 9	Main Street (SH 8141) in Valatie	NY 203	
980C	0.31	0.50	US 20	Wye connection (SH 615) in New Lebanon	NY 22	
980D	0.21	0.34	NY 22	Albany Street (SH 8514) in Canaan	Massachusetts state line (becomes Route 102)	Former NY 958
980E	0.16	0.26	NY 71	Wye connection (SH 1780) in Hillsdale	NY 22	Former NY 959
980F	0.30	0.48	NY 22	Old Route 22 (SH 5645 and SH 5347) in Copake	NY 344	Former NY 960
980G	0.71	1.14	NY 22	Old Route 22 (SH 5460 and SH 1722) in Washington	NY 343	
980J	1.67	2.69	Beacon city line	Fishkill Avenue (SH 567) in Fishkill	NY 52 at I-84 exit 44	Part of NY 52 Business
980P	2.12	3.41	NY 52 at I-84 exit 8 in Newburgh	South Street Arterial (SH 8408 and SH 61-7)	Liberty Street in Newburgh	Former routing of NY 52
980T	4.06	6.53	US 9W in New Windsor	Old Route 9W, River Road, Water Street, North Street, and Plank Road (SH 415, SH 1808, and SH 85-2)	US 9W / NY 32 in Newburgh	
980U	1.29	2.08	US 9W	Main Street (SH 8078) in Highlands	NY 218	
980W	0.64	1.03	NY 218	West Point Highway (SH 9115) in Highlands	U.S. Military Academy	
981B	0.28	0.45	I-684 at I-84 exit 68	SH 5203 and SH 64-6 in Southeast	NY 22	
981F	0.48	0.77	US 202	West Side Avenue (SH 1660) in Haverstraw	US 9W	
981G	0.33	0.53	NY 17	Seven Lakes Road (SH 49-1 and SH 63-10) in Sloatsburg	Seven Lakes Parkway	
981H	0.11	0.18	NY 340	Highland Avenue (SH 1697) in Orangetown	US 9W	
981J	0.17	0.27	NY 340	Highland Avenue (SH 8250) in Orangetown	US 9W	
981K	0.58	0.93	Hurley Avenue in Kingston	Washington Avenue (SH 62-21 and SH 5173)	NY 28 in Ulster	Former routing of NY 28
981L	0.21	0.34	Van Steenberg Lane	Reservoir Road (SH 1186) in Olive	NY 28	
981M	1.18	1.90	NY 983F at Kingston city line	Albany Avenue (SH 5000) in Ulster	US 9W	Former routing of US 209
981U	0.29	0.47	Memorial Highway	Cross Avenue (SH 65-20) in New Rochelle	I-95 exit 16	
981V	0.71	1.14	US 1 (Main Street)	Memorial Highway (SH 65-20, SH 54-7, and SH 57-7) in New Rochelle	Lincoln Avenue	
982B	0.92	1.48	Rye city line	Midland Avenue (SH 63-7 and SH 9479) in Port Chester	US 1	
982C	0.73	1.17	NY 120A	Putnam Avenue (SH 9369) in Port Chester	US 1	
982E	0.33	0.53	US 9W	Crystal Lake Cross Road (SH 9328) in Highlands	NY 218	
982H	0.33	0.53	NY 55	Burnett Boulevard (SH 549) in Poughkeepsie	US 44	
982J	0.81	1.30	River Street (NY 982K)	Palmer Avenue and Petersville Road (SH 66-22) in New Rochelle	Potter Avenue	
982K	1.07	1.72	US 1 north	River, Cedar, and Harrison Streets (SH 66-22) in New Rochelle	US 1 north	Not shown in the 2017 route log.
982L	2.29	3.69	New Jersey state line; continues as Garden State Parkway (unsigned NJ 444)	Garden State Parkway Connector (SH 56028) in Ramapo	I-87 / I-287 / Thruway exit 14A	Maintained by the New York State Thruway Authority
982M	2.30	3.70	Railroad bridge in Rhinebeck	Rhinecliff Road (SH 1530)	NY 308 at US 9 in Rhinebeck village	
982P	0.32	0.51	NY 17M (Brookside Avenue)	Main Street (SH 5297) in Chester	NY 94 (Academy Avenue)	
982Q	0.05	0.08	River Street (NY 982K)	Spring Street (SH 66-22) in New Rochelle	Cedar Street (NY 982K)	Not shown in the 2017 route log.
983B	2.37	3.81	South Broadway	Nepperhan Avenue Arterial and Old Nepperhan Avenue (SH 82-7, SH 72-8, SH 84-3, and SH 93-1) in Yonkers	NY 9A (Saw Mill River Road)	
983C	0.67	1.08	Nepperhan Avenue	Yonkers Avenue (SH 72-8 and SH 73-11) in Yonkers	Saw Mill River Parkway exit 5	
983D	0.39	0.63	NY 124	Spring Street (SH 899) in Lewisboro	NY 35	
983F	0.51	0.82	NY 32	Albany Avenue Arterial (SH 75-30 and SH 78-21) in Kingston	NY 981M at Ulster town line	Former routing of US 209
983G	0.16	0.26	Broadway	Albany Avenue (SH 58–14) in Kingston	NY 32	
983T	0.68	1.09	NY 376 (Raymond Avenue)	Hooker Avenue (SH 1529) in Poughkeepsie	Poughkeepsie city line	
983W	0.25	0.40	Fairmont Avenue	East West Arterial (SH 549) in Poughkeepsie	US 44 / NY 55	
984A	0.25	0.40	Poughkeepsie city line	Salt Point Turnpike (SH 9451) in Poughkeepsie	NY 115	
984C	0.50	0.80	NY 17	SH 53-15 in Woodbury	I-87 / Thruway exit 16	
984D	0.57	0.92	US 9W in Esopus	Old Route 9W (SH 5599D and SH 5599C)	Abeel Street in Kingston	
984E	2.54	4.09	Saw Mill River Parkway exit 5	Yonkers Avenue (SH 79-12) in Yonkers	Bronx River Parkway	
984G	0.50	0.80	NY 984J	Manhattanville Road (SH 81-8) in Harrison	NY 120	Former number; still shown in the 2017 route log as a current route.
984H	1.57	2.53	New York City line	Riverdale Avenue Arterial (SH 82-16 and SH 81-13) in Yonkers	Warburton Avenue	
984J	1.53	2.46	Hutchinson River Parkway	I-684 east spur (SH 65-17) in Harrison	I-684	
984K	0.40	0.64	US 9W	River Road (SH 41-2) in New Windsor	NY 980T (Old Route 9W)	
984L	0.43	0.69	NY 9A	Tuckahoe Road (SH 89-3) in Yonkers	I-87 / Thruway exit 6	
984M	0.08	0.13	Saw Mill River Parkway	Farragut Avenue (SH 9539) in Hastings-on-Hudson	NY 9A	
984P	1.55	2.49	NY 82 / NY 343	North Avenue and Franklin Avenue (SH 1114) in Millbrook	US 44	Former routing of US 44
987A	5.59	9.00	Seven Lakes Parkway in Haverstraw	Lake Welch Parkway (SH 67-3 and SH 67-4)	Palisades Interstate Parkway in Stony Point	Maintained by the New York State Department of Transportation (under Palisades Interstate Park Commission jurisdiction)
987C	26.14	42.07	New Jersey state line	Palisades Interstate Parkway (SH 54-1, SH 55-1, SH 56-1, SH 53-9, SH 53-1, SH 51-2, SH 50-2, SH 48-1, SH 50-1, SH 52-1, and SH 58-1)	US 6 / US 9W / US 202 in Highlands	Maintained by the New York State Department of Transportation (under Palisades Interstate Park Commission jurisdiction)
987D	29.81	47.97	New York City line	Saw Mill River Parkway (SH 9484, SH 9485, and SH 9486)	I-684 exit 5 in Bedford	Maintained by the New York State Department of Transportation
987E	17.27	27.79	Johnsontown Road in Sloatsburg	Seven Lakes Parkway (SH 61-1, SH 77-3, SH 74-1, SH 65-2, SH 58-1, SH 50-1, SH 74-4, and SH 77-4)	US 9W / US 202 in Stony Point	Maintained by the New York State Department of Transportation (under Palisades Interstate Park Commission jurisdiction)
987F	12.62	20.31	Bronx River Parkway in Yonkers	Sprain Brook Parkway (SH 9488)	Taconic State Parkway in Mount Pleasant	Maintained by the New York State Department of Transportation
987G	104.33	167.90	Bronx River Parkway in Mount Pleasant	Taconic State Parkway (SH 9480, SH 9481, SH 9482, and SH 9483)	I-90 / Thruway in Chatham	Maintained by the New York State Department of Transportation
987H	6.61	10.64	US 6 / US 9 / US 202 in Peekskill	Bear Mountain State Parkway (SH 9500 and SH 9480)	Taconic State Parkway in Yorktown	Maintained by the New York State Department of Transportation; 2017 route log shows Bear Mountain State Parkway as NY 981P, which consists of the western Section from South Street (off of the Annsville Circle) to Crompond Road (US 202/NY 35) and the Eastern Section from US 202/NY35 just west of Pine Grove Court to the Taconic State Parkway.
987J	0.45	0.72	Saw Mill River Parkway	Farragut Parkway (SH 9485) in Hastings-on-Hudson	Farragut Avenue	

== Region 9 ==
Region 9 primarily covers the eastern Southern Tier and the Central Leatherstocking and Catskill regions. The counties comprising this region are Broome, Chenango, Delaware, Otsego, Schoharie, and Sullivan. Region 9 also includes Tioga County; however, the reference routes in Tioga County have designations corresponding to Region 6 since the county was part of Region 6 when the routes were assigned.

Route	Length (mi)	Length (km)	From	Via	To	Notes
990D	1.13	1.82	Binghamton city line	Riverside Drive (SH 444) in Johnson City	NY 201	Formerly part of NY 17H
990E	0.09	0.14	NY 201	Floral Avenue (SH 54-7) in Johnson City	Orchard Avenue	
990F	0.43	0.69	US 11	Crescent Drive and Francis Street (SH 834) in Kirkwood, New York	NY 990G	
990G	1.16	1.87	US 11	Old Route 17 (SH 5022) in Kirkwood, New York	I-86/NY 17 at I-81 exit 2	
990H	1.06	1.71	Binghamton city line	Chenango Street (SH 5506) in Port Dickinson	NY 7	
990J	0.62	1.00	NY 369	SH 1871 in Fenton	Pigeon Hill Road at Chenango Valley State Park	
990K	4.04	6.50	NY 369 in Fenton	SH 5242 and SH 266	NY 7 in Colesville	Former number; former routing of NY 7; now NY 7B
990L	1.44	2.32	NY 12 in Norwich city	East Main Street and East River Road (SH 59-18 and SH 59-24)	NY 23 in Norwich	Signed as a touring route
990P	10.66	17.16	NY 97 in Hancock	SH 5456, SH 65-9, SH 53-3, and SH 8534	NY 10 in Tompkins	Former number; formerly NY 236 then NY 989; now NY 268
990T	0.10	0.16	NY 17 at exit 84	SH 5045 in Deposit	NY 8 / NY 10	Short connection from the underpass to the eastbound NY 17 ramps
990V	6.11	9.83	NY 30 in Gilboa	SH 1784, SH BWS, and SH 1347	Bear Kill Road in Conesville	Formerly NY 342; signed as a touring route
991A	2.15	3.46	NY 220	Steere Road (SH 76-7) in McDonough	Bowman Lake State Park	
991C	0.32	0.51	NY 201 at NY 17 exit 70	SH 68-8 in Johnson City	Harry L. Drive	
991D	0.15	0.24	Susquehanna River bridge in Oneonta	Ramp connection (SH 71-18)	NY 205 at I-88 exit 13 in Oneonta	
991F	0.25	0.40	I-88 exit 16	SH 71-6 in Oneonta	NY 7	
991H	0.75	1.21	I-88 exit 10 in Sidney	Ramp connection and Susquehanna River bridge (SH 73-11 and SH 73-12)	NY 7 in Unadilla	
991J	0.55	0.89	Otsego CR 48 in Otego	Ramp connection and Susquehanna River bridge (SH 73-8)	NY 7 in Otego	Serves I-88 exit 12
991L	0.44	0.71	NY 41 in Afton	Ramp connection (SH 1171 and SH 72-5)	I-88 exit 7 in Afton	
991T	0.18	0.29	Otsego CR 58 south of I-88 / NY 28	Gersoni Road (SH 77-19) in Milford	NY 28 at I-88 exit 17	
992D	0.65	1.05	NY 28 in Oneonta	Main Street (SH 5455 and SH 77-14)	NY 7 / NY 23 in Oneonta	Former routing of NY 28; serves I-88 exit 14
992E	0.73	1.17	Washington Street	Riverside Drive (SH 63-27) in Binghamton	NY 363 / NY 434	
992G	0.51	0.82	NY 7	D.K. Lifgren Drive (SH 318) in Milford	NY 28	Former routing of NY 28; now connects it with NY 7 since the new alignment passes over NY 7
992H	0.82	1.32	I-88 exit 18	SH 77-9 in Maryland	NY 7	
992J	0.37	0.60	I-88 exit 19	Hollenbeck Road (SH 77-5) in Worcester	NY 7	
992K	0.34	0.55	NY 7 / NY 10	Ramp connection (SH 77-27) in Richmondville	I-88 exit 20	
992L	0.26	0.42	I-88 exit 21	Hite Road (SH 77-21) in Richmondville	NY 7 / NY 10	
992P	0.69	1.11	I-88 exit 5	Martin Hill Road (SH 72-1) in Colesville	NY 7	
992Q	0.31	0.50	CR 176	NY 17 Exit 99 connector (SH 5223)	NY 17	

== Regions 10 and 11 ==
Regions 10 and 11 collectively cover the core of Downstate New York, with Region 10 covering Long Island and Region 11 covering New York City. As such, Nassau and Suffolk counties comprise Region 10 and the five boroughs of New York City—The Bronx, Brooklyn (Kings County), Manhattan (New York County), Queens, and Staten Island (Richmond County)—comprise Region 11.

Route	Length (mi)	Length (km)	From	Via	To	Notes	
900A	0.08	0.13	Greenport Marina	Main Street (SH 1719) in Greenport	NY 25		
900B	1.93	3.11	North Hempstead town line	Glen Cove Road (SH 52-7) in Oyster Bay	NY 107	Formerly NY 904	
900C	0.68	1.09	Orient Beach State Park	Orient Park Road (SH 1902) in Orient Point	NY 25		
900D	0.40	0.64	NY 27A	Old Sunrise Highway (SH 5701A) in East Massapequa	Suffolk County line (becomes CR 12)	Former routing of NY 27	
900F	0.89	1.43	New York City line	Union Turnpike (SH 42-1) in North New Hyde Park	Marcus Avenue	Formerly part of NY 25C	
900G	0.66	1.06	I-278	Triborough Bridge spur (SH BRDGE) in Manhattan	East 126th Street		
900J	0.60	0.97	Cross Bay Parkway (NY 907J) at Beach Channel Drive in Rockaway Beach	Cross Bay Bridge in Queens	Cross Bay Boulevard at Van Brunt Road in Broad Channel		
900P	0.41	0.66	New York City line	Jericho Turnpike (SH 1831) in Bellerose Terrace	NY 25 (Braddock Avenue)	Former routing of NY 25	
900V	0.25	0.40	Atlantic Beach Bridge toll booth	Nassau Expressway (SH 52-1) in Lawrence	Seagirt Boulevard	Former number; overlapped with NY 878	
900W	2.79	4.49	Knoll Road	Montauk Highway (SH 1274) in Southampton	Tuckahoe Lane	Former routing of NY 27A	
901A	0.67	1.08	I-495 north service road	Simeon Woods Road (SH 61-5 and SH 64-5) in Islip	Kings Highway	Serves Suffolk County and New York State government offices	
901B	1.00	1.61	Rockaway Point Boulevard in Queens	Marine Parkway–Gil Hodges Memorial Bridge (SH AUTH)	Toll booth at Flatbush Avenue in Brooklyn		
901C	0.33	0.53	New York City line	Seagirt Boulevard (SH 52-1) in Lawrence	Nassau Expressway		
906A	42.90	69.04	Horace Harding Expressway service road at New York City line	I-495 eastbound service road (SH 495IE)	Sills Road in Brookhaven		
906B	42.86	68.98	Sills Road in Brookhaven	I-495 westbound service road (SH 495IW)	Horace Harding Expressway service road at New York City line		
906C	21.32	34.31	NY 109 in Babylon	NY 27 eastbound service road (SH 27E)	Hospital Road in Brookhaven		
906D	20.48	32.96	NY 112 in Brookhaven	NY 27 westbound service road (SH 27W)	NY 109 in Babylon		
907A	10.44	16.80	Laurelton Parkway in Queens	Cross Island Parkway (Belt System) (SH PKWAY)	I-678 (Whitestone Expressway) in Queens	Maintained by the New York City Department of Transportation	
907B	1.71	2.75	NY 27	Laurelton Parkway (Belt System) (SH PKWAY) in Queens	Southern State Parkway	Maintained by the New York City Department of Transportation	
907C	17.73	28.53	I-278 (Gowanus Expressway) in Brooklyn	Shore Parkway (Belt System) (SH PKWAY)	Lefferts Boulevard in Queens	Maintained by the New York State Department of Transportation and New York City Department of Transportation	
907D	4.99	8.03	Shore Parkway (Belt System) at Lefferts Boulevard	Southern Parkway (Belt System) (SH PKWAY) in Queens	NY 27	Maintained by the New York State Department of Transportation and New York City Department of Transportation	
907E	2.63	4.23	Southern State Parkway	Bethpage State Parkway (SH 36-1) in Old Bethpage	Bethpage State Park	Maintained by the New York State Department of Transportation (under New York State Office of Parks, Recreation and Historic Preservation jurisdiction)	
907F	2.28	3.67	Bronx River Parkway	Bronx and Pelham Parkway (SH PKWAY) in the Bronx	I-95 (Bruckner Expressway)	Maintained by the New York City Department of Transportation	
907G	13.35	21.48	Westchester County line	Bronx River Parkway in Westchester County	NY 22 in North Castle		Former number; now maintained by Westchester County and designated CR 9987
907H	5.59	9.00	Story Avenue	Bronx River Parkway (SH PKWAY) in the Bronx	Westchester County line	Maintained by the New York City Department of Transportation	
907J	0.34	0.55	Shore Front Parkway	Cross Bay Parkway (SH PKWAY) in Queens	Cross Bay Bridge (NY 900J)	Maintained by the New York City Department of Transportation	
907K	4.48	7.21	Saw Mill River Parkway in Yonkers	Cross County Parkway (SH 9487)	Hutchinson River Parkway in Pelham and Eastchester	Maintained by the New York State Department of Transportation; located in Region 8	
907L	9.70	15.61	I-478 (Battery Tunnel)	Franklin D. Roosevelt Drive (SH PKWAY, SH 86-1, and SH 90-2) in Manhattan	Triborough Bridge	Maintained by the New York State Department of Transportation and New York City Department of Transportation	
907M	14.65	23.58	31st Street	Grand Central Parkway (SH PKWAY) in Queens	Nassau County line	Maintained by the New York State Department of Transportation	
907P	4.19	6.74	Triborough Bridge	Harlem River Drive (SH PKWAY) in Manhattan	Dyckman Street and Tenth Avenue	Maintained by the New York State Department of Transportation	
907T				Heckscher State Parkway		Former number; now part of NY 908M	
907V	10.94	17.61	72nd Street in Manhattan	Henry Hudson Parkway (SH CTYST, SH PKWAY, and SH AUTH)	Westchester County line	Maintained by the New York State Department of Transportation, New York City Department of Transportation, and Port Authority of New York and New Jersey	
907W	14.36	23.11	New York City line	Hutchinson River Parkway (SH 9489) in Westchester County	Connecticut state line (becomes Route 15)	Maintained by the New York State Department of Transportation; located in Region 8	
908A	4.35	7.00	I-95 (Cross Bronx Expressway)	Hutchinson River Parkway (SH PKWAY) in the Bronx	Westchester County line	Maintained by the New York City Department of Transportation	
908B	4.60	7.40	Jamaica Avenue in Brooklyn	Jackie Robinson Parkway (SH PKWAY)	I-678 / Grand Central Parkway in Queens	Maintained by the New York State Department of Transportation (under New York City Department of Transportation jurisdiction)	
908C	2.52	4.06	Lido Boulevard	Loop Parkway (SH 58-1) in Hempstead	Meadowbrook State Parkway	Maintained by the New York State Department of Transportation (under New York State Office of Parks, Recreation and Historic Preservation jurisdiction)	
908D				Marine Parkway		Former number	
908E	12.50	20.12	Ocean Parkway in Hempstead	Meadowbrook State Parkway (SH 9502, SH 9503, and SH 9504)	Northern State Parkway	Maintained by the New York State Department of Transportation (under New York State Office of Parks, Recreation and Historic Preservation jurisdiction)	
908F	3.10	4.99	Bronx Park East	Southern Boulevard and Mosholu Parkway (SH PKWAY) in the Bronx	Henry Hudson Parkway	Maintained by the New York State Department of Transportation and New York City Department of Transportation	
908G	28.89	46.49	Grand Central Parkway at New York City line	Northern State Parkway (SH 9505, SH 33-1, SH 38-3, SH 47-2, SH 48-2, SH 49-1, SH 50-2, and SH 63-2)	NY 347 / NY 454 in Smithtown	Maintained by the New York State Department of Transportation (under New York State Office of Parks, Recreation and Historic Preservation jurisdiction)	
908H	4.87	7.84	Sea Breeze Avenue	Ocean Parkway (SH PKWAY) in Brooklyn	Church Avenue	Maintained by the New York State Department of Transportation and New York City Department of Transportation	
908J	8.41	13.53	Robert Moses State Park	Robert Moses Causeway (SH 95-13, SH 66-1, and SH 51-1) in Islip	Southern State Parkway	Maintained by the New York State Department of Transportation (under New York State Office of Parks, Recreation and Historic Preservation jurisdiction)	
908K	11.35	18.27	Southern State Parkway in Islip	Sagtikos State Parkway and Sunken Meadow State Parkway (SH 51-1 and SH 55-1)	Sunken Meadow State Park in Smithtown	Maintained by the New York State Department of Transportation (under New York State Office of Parks, Recreation and Historic Preservation jurisdiction)	
908L	1.62	2.61	Beach 108th Street	Shore Front Parkway (SH PKWAY) in Queens	Beach 73rd Street	Maintained by the New York City Department of Transportation	
908M	33.70	54.23	Laurelton Parkway at New York City line	Southern State Parkway and Heckscher State Parkway (SH 34-3, SH 9506, SH 9507, SH 9509, SH 9510, SH 39-3, SH 41-1, SH 47-3, SH 60-1, and SH 59-1)	Heckscher State Park in Islip	Maintained by the New York State Department of Transportation (under New York State Office of Parks, Recreation and Historic Preservation jurisdiction)	
908P				Sunken Meadow State Parkway		Former number; now part of NY 908K	
908T	13.37	21.52	Ocean Parkway in Hempstead	Wantagh State Parkway (SH 9511, SH 38-2, and SH 38-4)	Northern State Parkway in North Hempstead	Maintained by the New York State Department of Transportation (under New York State Office of Parks, Recreation and Historic Preservation jurisdiction)	
908V				Woodhaven Boulevard in Queens		Former number	
908W				West Shore Expressway		Former number; now part of NY 440	
909A				Meadowbrook Causeway		Former number; now part of NY 908E	
909B				Wantagh Causeway		Former number; now part of NY 908T	
909C	4.62	7.44	Outerbridge Crossing	Korean War Veterans Parkway (SH 70-1, SH 68-1, and SH 66-2) in Staten Island	Richmond Avenue	Maintained by the New York State Department of Transportation	
909D	15.71	25.28	Meadowbrook State Parkway in Hempstead	Ocean Parkway (SH 33-1)	Captree State Park in Islip	Maintained by the New York State Department of Transportation (under New York State Office of Parks, Recreation and Historic Preservation jurisdiction)	
909E	1.83	2.95	Ocean Parkway	Bay Parkway (SH AUTH) in Hempstead	Wantagh State Parkway	Maintained by the New York State Department of Transportation (under New York State Office of Parks, Recreation and Historic Preservation jurisdiction)	
909G	1.98	3.19	182nd Street and 150th Drive	Rockaway Boulevard (SH 9526) in Queens	Nassau County line (becomes CR 257)		
