= New York State Route 434 =

Highway in New York

New York State Route 434
- Map of the Binghamton area with NY 434 highlighted in red

Route information
- Maintained by NYSDOT and the city of Binghamton
- Length: 20.89 mi (33.62 km)
- Existed: January 1, 1970–present

Major junctions
- West end: NY 96 in Owego village
- I-86 / NY 17 in Owego village and Owego town NY 26 near Endicott; NY 201 near Johnson City
- East end: US 11 in Binghamton

Location
- Country: United States
- State: New York
- Counties: Tioga, Broome

Highway system
- New York Highways; Interstate; US; State; Reference; Parkways
← NY 433	→ NY 436

New York State Route 434 (NY 434) is a state highway located in the Southern Tier of New York in the United States. The route extends for 20.89 miles (33.62 km) from an intersection with NY 96 in the village of Owego to an intersection with U.S. Route 11 (US 11) in the city of Binghamton. In between, NY 434 passes through the towns of Owego and Vestal. The portion of NY 434 from the Tioga–Broome county line to downtown Binghamton is known as the Vestal Parkway.

NY 434 is the former route of NY 17 prior to the construction of the Southern Tier Expressway (STE), which NY 434 parallels. The portion of the expressway from Owego to Johnson City opened in 1969, at which time NY 17 was realigned to follow the STE from Owego to Vestal and NY 17's former routing between the two locations was redesignated as New York State Route 188. However, in October 1969, NY 188 was renumbered to NY 434 as the New York State Department of Transportation believed that the 188 designation would lead to confusion with the then-future Interstate 88 (I-88) northeast of Binghamton. One month later, the portion of former NY 17 between Owego and the Tioga–Broome County line was removed from the state highway system.

The NY 434 designation was officially assigned on January 1, 1970, and initially extended from the Tioga–Broome county line to Vestal. It was extended eastward to downtown Binghamton by 1973 following the completion of the STE between Johnson City and Binghamton and westward to Owego in the late 1970s after NY 17's former routing from Owego to the county line was re-added to the state highway system.

== Route description ==
The highway traverses two distinct areas, loosely separated by the Tioga–Broome county line. While the Tioga County section serves small communities and sections of undeveloped, rural areas, the portion in Broome County is a major arterial that runs through Binghamton's western suburbs. The easternmost two blocks of NY 434 in the city of Binghamton are locally maintained while the remainder of the route is maintained by the New York State Department of Transportation (NYSDOT).

=== Tioga County ===
NY 434 begins south of the village of Owego at an intersection with NY 96. The highway heads to the east as a two-lane road, closely paralleling I-86/NY 17 as it runs along the southern edge of the Susquehanna River valley. The first junction along the route leads to exit 64, the first of three exits directly connecting NY 434 to the nearby freeway. Continuing on, NY 434 serves a housing tract and a cluster of commercial properties at the southeastern edge of the village before heading into less developed areas of the town. For most of the next 12 miles (19 km), NY 434 runs directly alongside the eastbound lanes of the freeway, separated by only a fence in all but a handful of areas.

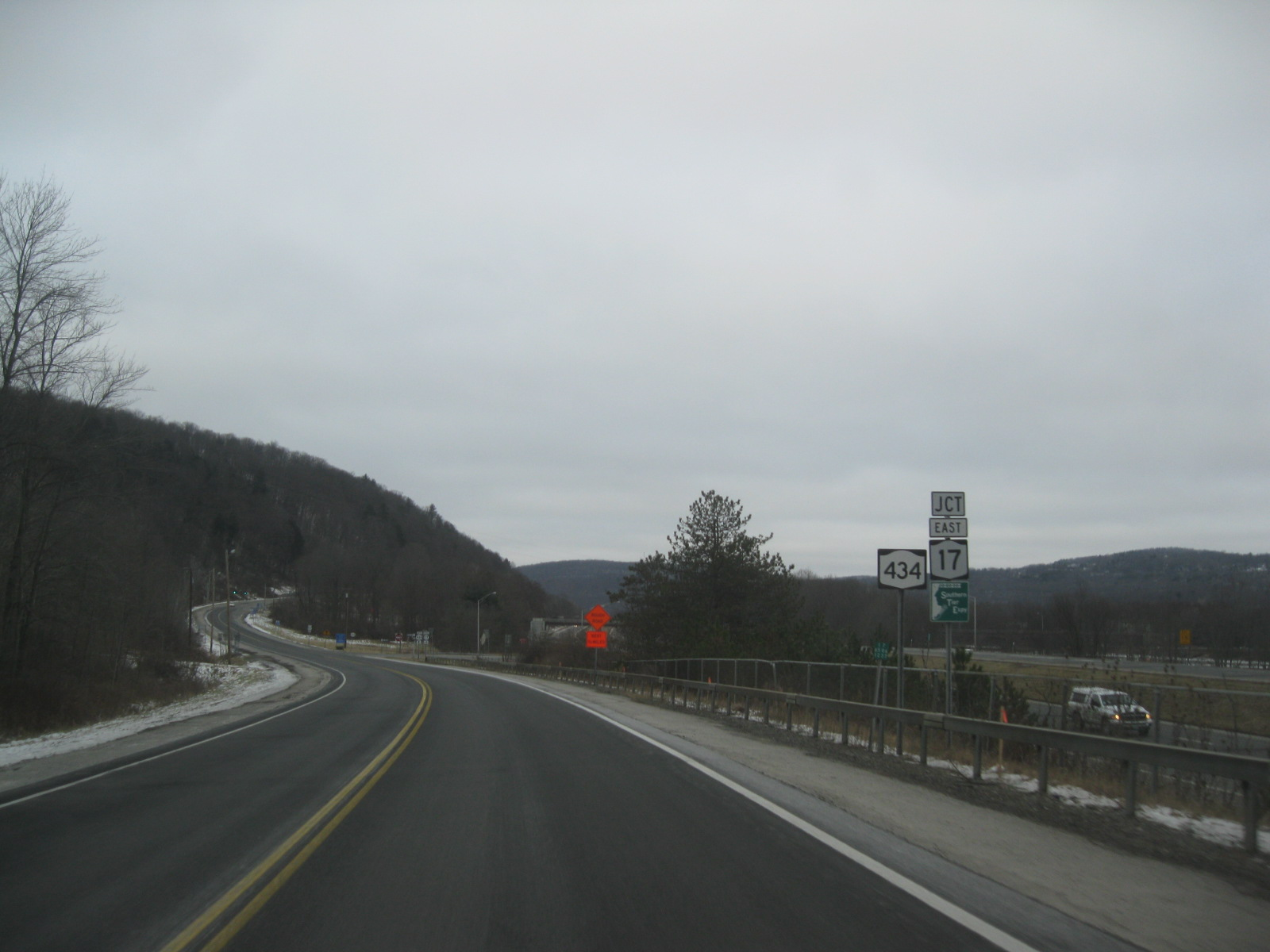
NY 434 west at I-86 exit 65 in Owego. I-86 is at right, separated from NY 434 by only a fence.

East of the village limits, I-86 and NY 434 curve to the southeast, mirroring a similar turn in the course of the river and its surrounding valley. The route continues through forests and mostly undeveloped fields, serving exit 65 of I-86/NY 17 and passing by Owego Town Court ahead of another bend in the river. I-86 and NY 434 again turn to match, proceeding generally eastward across an area of marshland along the southern edge of the river valley. Past the marsh, the valley swerves southward for a second time, taking the Susquehanna River and the two roads alongside it into an area with firmer ground. Here, NY 434 begins to run along a line of homes and businesses that mark the northern edge of the hamlet of Apalachin.

The highway heads generally southeasterly through the community to Apalachin's central business district, largely centered around NY 434's junction with County Route 41 (CR 41). Continuing on, the route passes through a small, undeveloped area at an intersection with NY 962J, a signed reference route linking NY 434 to part of exit 66 of I-86/NY 17 and to NY 17C on the north bank of the river. Past NY 962J, the path of the Susquehanna River turns again, taking on a northeasterly track toward the Broome County line. NY 434 bends northeastward as a result, running past several scattered businesses on the outskirts of Apalachin before finally leaving the community. Occasional stretches of homes continue to follow the route to the county line, where the road widens from two to four lanes and becomes a divided highway.

=== Broome County ===
Across the county line in the town of Vestal, NY 434 assumes the name Vestal Parkway and heads into more densely populated areas that serve as Binghamton's suburbs. The homes alongside the road are replaced by businesses in the hamlet of Vestal, the first of several large communities that NY 434 serves in Broome County's progressively widening river valley. It becomes a major commercial strip as it proceeds northeastward through the community, a trait that NY 434 retains throughout the Binghamton suburbs. Just east of Vestal's central business direct, the highway intersects NY 26 at a partial cloverleaf interchange just south of NY 26's full cloverleaf with I-86/NY 17. Past NY 26, I-86 heads across the Susquehanna River, leaving NY 434 as the primary highway on the river's south bank.

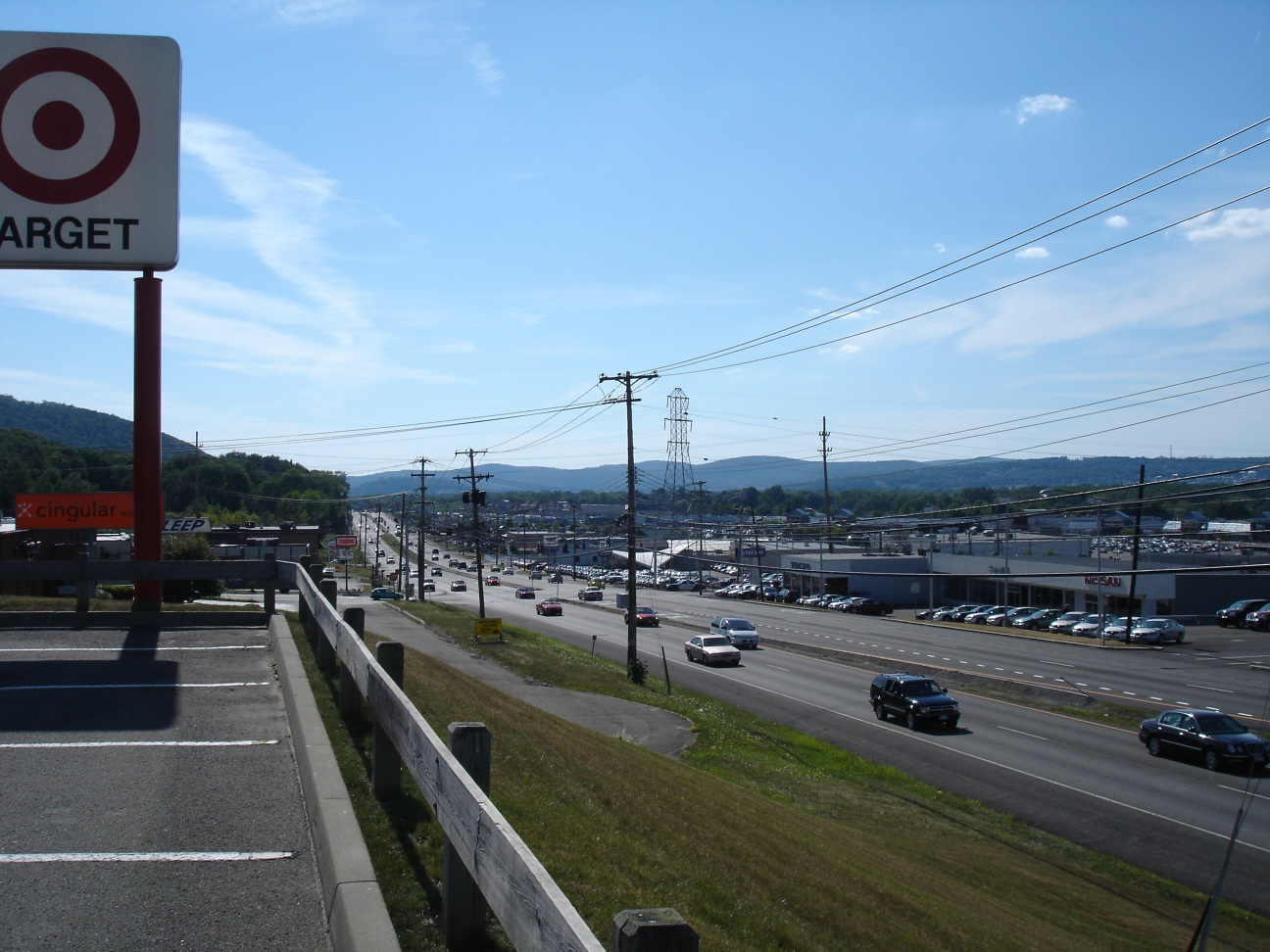
Looking westbound along the Vestal Parkway (NY 434) in Vestal

The strip malls and plazas along NY 434 become progressively larger in size as the highway heads east, leading to two large shopping malls at a junction with Sycamore Street about 3 miles (4.8 km) east of the hamlet of Vestal. The pair of plazas feature several national chain stores, such as Walmart, Target, Sam's Club, and Lowe's, and a handful of others are located nearby at various points along NY 434. Continuing on, the route reaches the campus of Binghamton University, located adjacent to a trumpet interchange that links NY 434 to NY 201, a north–south freeway connecting the college to Johnson City on the north bank of the Susquehanna. The route remains on an easterly path to the edge of the campus, where it turns southeast to directly run alongside the river for the first time. At this point, the businesses begin to taper off, giving way to dense residential neighborhoods as the road crosses into the Binghamton city limits.

NY 434 remains a four-lane divided highway for its first 2 miles (3.2 km) in the city, following the Susquehanna River along the north edge of a vast neighborhood that comprises the south half of Binghamton. It soon approaches the vicinity of downtown Binghamton, where the route connects to Pennsylvania Avenue by way of an interchange located across the river from the city's center. Another grade-separated junction with Conklin Avenue follows, at which point NY 434 turns northward and crosses the river into downtown as State Street. On the north bank of the river, NY 434 meets NY 363, a freeway linking downtown to the Southern Tier Expressway north of the city. NY 434 continues on, narrowing to two divided then undivided lanes for its final two blocks as it passes the Broome County Veterans Memorial Arena and ends at a junction with US 11 (Court Street).

== History ==
=== Origins ===
When the first set of posted routes in New York were assigned in 1924, what is now NY 434 was designated as part of NY 17, a cross-state highway connecting Erie, Pennsylvania, to New York City. In the mid-1960s, construction began on the portion of the Southern Tier Expressway (STE) between the village of Owego and the city of Binghamton. The segment from Owego to Johnson City was completed and opened to traffic in 1969, with the portion from Owego to Vestal becoming a realignment of NY 17.

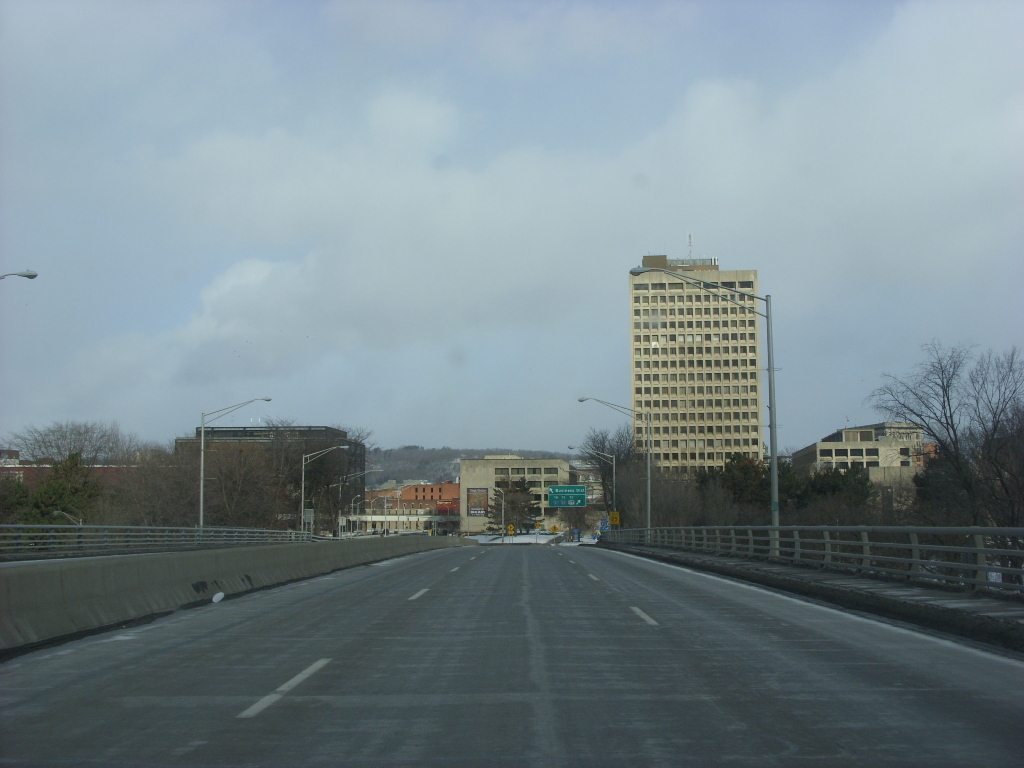
Downtown Binghamton as seen from the NY 434 bridge over the Susquehanna River

NYSDOT initially designated the former routing of NY 17 from Owego to NY 26 in Vestal as NY 188. However, on October 10, 1969, NYSDOT announced that they had elected to designate the highway as NY 434 instead, even though signage for NY 188 had already been erected. The state cited potential confusion between NY 188 and the proposed I-88 northeast of Binghamton as its reason for the change. At the same time, NYSDOT stated that the NY 434 designation would only extend as far west as the Tioga–Broome County line even though NY 188 had continued to Owego. Instead, the state planned on transferring ownership and maintenance of former NY 17 from Owego east to the county line to Tioga County. This transaction was completed on November 24, 1969.

=== Designation and extensions ===
NY 434 was officially assigned on January 1, 1970, as part of a wide-scale update of NYSDOT's Official Description of Touring Routes in New York State. A list of changes accompanying the log described NY 434 as "a new number assigned to replace former NY 17 between the Broome–Tioga County line and NY 26 in Vestal." At the time, NY 434 also ended at NY 17 in Vestal. Although the STE was open from Vestal to Johnson City, it was not slated to become part of NY 17 until the segment of the STE from Johnson City to Interstate 81 was completed. As a result, NY 17 exited the STE at Vestal, overlapped NY 26 south to Vestal Parkway, and followed its original alignment along Vestal Parkway into downtown Binghamton. The Johnson City–I-81 piece of the expressway was completed and opened to traffic by 1973. NY 17 was realigned to follow the STE while NY 17's former routing from Vestal to Binghamton became an extension of NY 434 on July 1, 1974. Like the NY 17 realignment, the NY 434 extension had been planned years before.

The former routing of NY 17 in Tioga County between Owego and the eastern county line remained a county route through at least the mid-1970s. However, in the late 1970s, the Tioga County Legislature drafted a resolution that, if passed, would return jurisdiction of the highway to the state of New York. It was passed by 1980, at which point the state of New York reacquired the highway and made it a westward extension of NY 434.

== Major intersections ==
County	Location	mi	km	Destinations	Notes
Tioga	Village of Owego	0.00	0.00	NY 96 to I-86 east / NY 17 east – Binghamton	Western terminus
Tioga	Village of Owego	0.15	0.24	I-86 west / NY 17 west – Elmira	Access via NY 962G; exit 64 on I-86
Tioga	Town of Owego	1.80– 2.00	2.90– 3.22	I-86 / NY 17 to NY 17C – Elmira, Jamestown	Access to NY 17C via NY 960J; exit 65 on I-86
Tioga	Town of Owego	7.23– 7.26	11.64– 11.68	I-86 / NY 17 to NY 17C	Access to NY 17C via NY 962J; exit 66 on I-86; hamlet of Apalachin
Broome	Vestal	13.30	21.40	NY 26 – Vestal Center, Endicott	Parclo interchange
Broome	Vestal	17.01	27.37	NY 201 north – Johnson City	Trumpet interchange; southern terminus of NY 201
Broome	Binghamton	20.56	33.09	NY 363 north to I-81 / I-88 east (NY 7 east) / NY 17	Southern terminus of NY 363
Broome	Binghamton	20.89	33.62	US 11	Eastern terminus
1.000 mi = 1.609 km; 1.000 km = 0.621 mi
