= New York State Route 340 =

State highway in Rockland County, New York, US

New York State Route 340
- Map of southeastern Rockland County and vicinity with NY 340 highlighted in red

Route information
- Maintained by NYSDOT, the town of Orangetown and the village of Piermont
- Length: 3.10 mi (4.99 km)
- Existed: c. 1932–present

Major junctions
- West end: NY 303 in Orangeburg
- US 9W in Orangeburg and Piermont
- East end: CR 501 at the New Jersey state line near Tappan

Location
- Country: United States
- State: New York
- Counties: Rockland

Highway system
- New York Highways; Interstate; US; State; Reference; Parkways
← NY 339	→ NY 341

New York State Route 340 (NY 340) is a 3.10-mile (4.99 km) state highway in southeastern Rockland County, New York, in the United States. Though it is signed as an east–west route, it actually follows a north–south alignment. The southern terminus of the route is at the New Jersey state line in Palisades, where it becomes County Route 501 (CR 501). The northern terminus is at an intersection with NY 303 in Orangeburg; however, according to the New York State Department of Transportation (NYSDOT), the route continued for another 0.07 miles (0.11 km) to the northwest of NY 303 until by 2017. NY 340 was assigned to part of its modern routing in the early 1930s and extended to its current length in the early 1940s.

== Route description ==
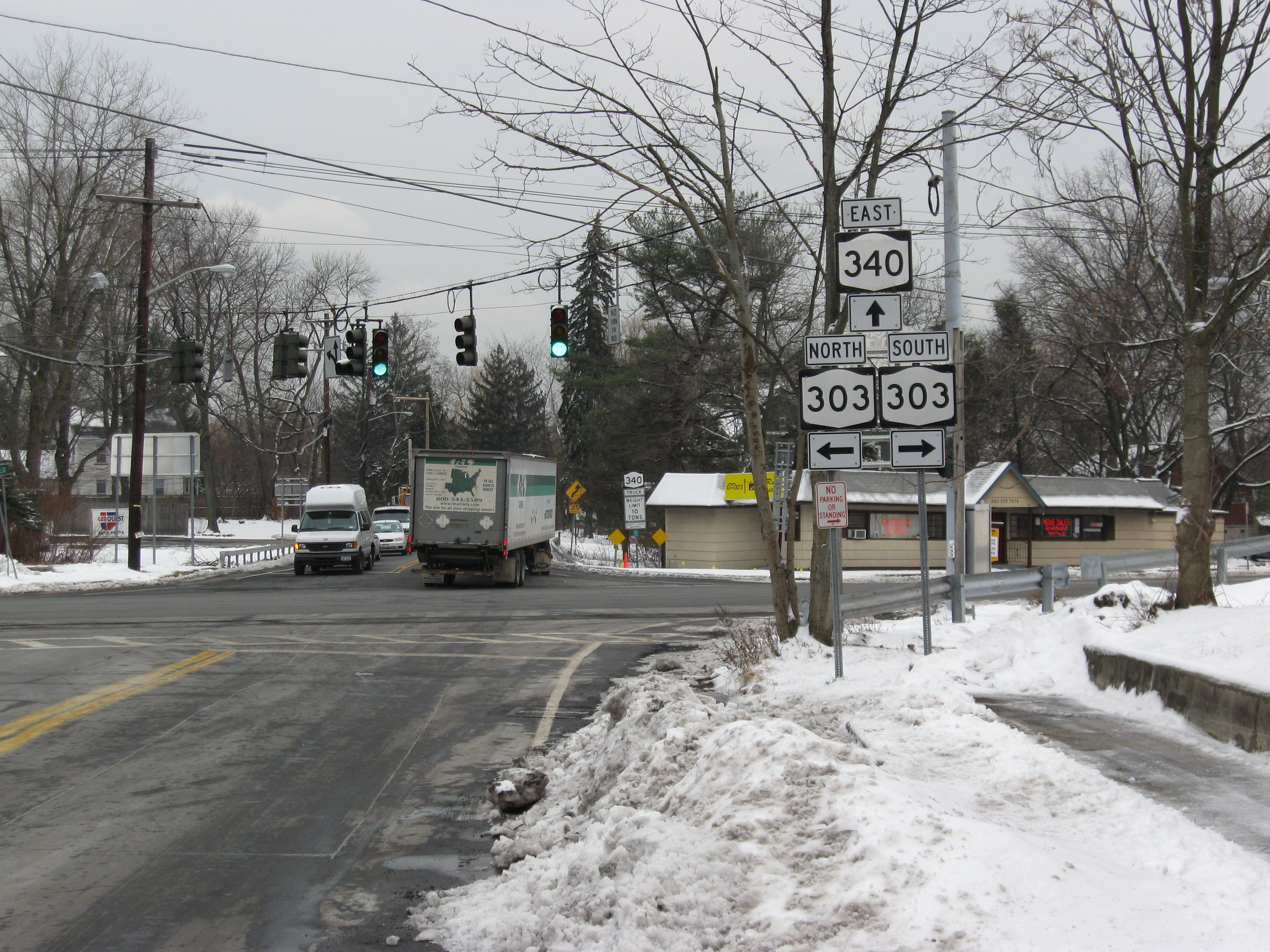
NY 340 at the junction with NY 303 in Orangeburg

NY 340 begins at the New Jersey–New York border in Palisades. Directly south of the border is Rockleigh, New Jersey, in which the route continues as that state's CR 501. The route heads northward through the town of Orangetown, serving a residential community before entering a more forested area and crossing over the Palisades Interstate Parkway (PIP). Not far to the north is the densely populated hamlet of Sparkill, where the highway passes Rockland Country Club and John O'Rourke Memorial Park. In the center of Sparkill, NY 340 indirectly connects to southbound U.S. Route 9W (US 9W) and meets CR 8, the only county route that NY 340 comes in contact with. Just past the indirect junction with US 9W is an intersection with Ferdon Avenue, where maintenance of NY 340 shifts from NYSDOT to the town of Orangetown.

Just 0.11 miles (0.18 km) northwest of Ferdon Avenue, the route briefly enters the village of Piermont, where it remains locally maintained. Here, it indirectly connects to US 9W northbound. Outside of the village limits, NYSDOT resumes maintenance of the highway as it traverses areas more commercial and educational in nature. Along this last stretch, NY 340 passes St. Thomas Aquinas College before intersecting NY 303 near the hamlet of Orangeburg. This junction serves as the northern terminus of NY 340; however, the route officially continued for another 0.07 miles (0.11 km) to a 90-degree turn where Orangeburg Road (NY 340) becomes Greenbush Road. One block north of this point is the eastern terminus of CR 20, which provides access to the PIP from NY 303 and NY 340. It was truncated to end at NY 303 by 2017.

== History ==
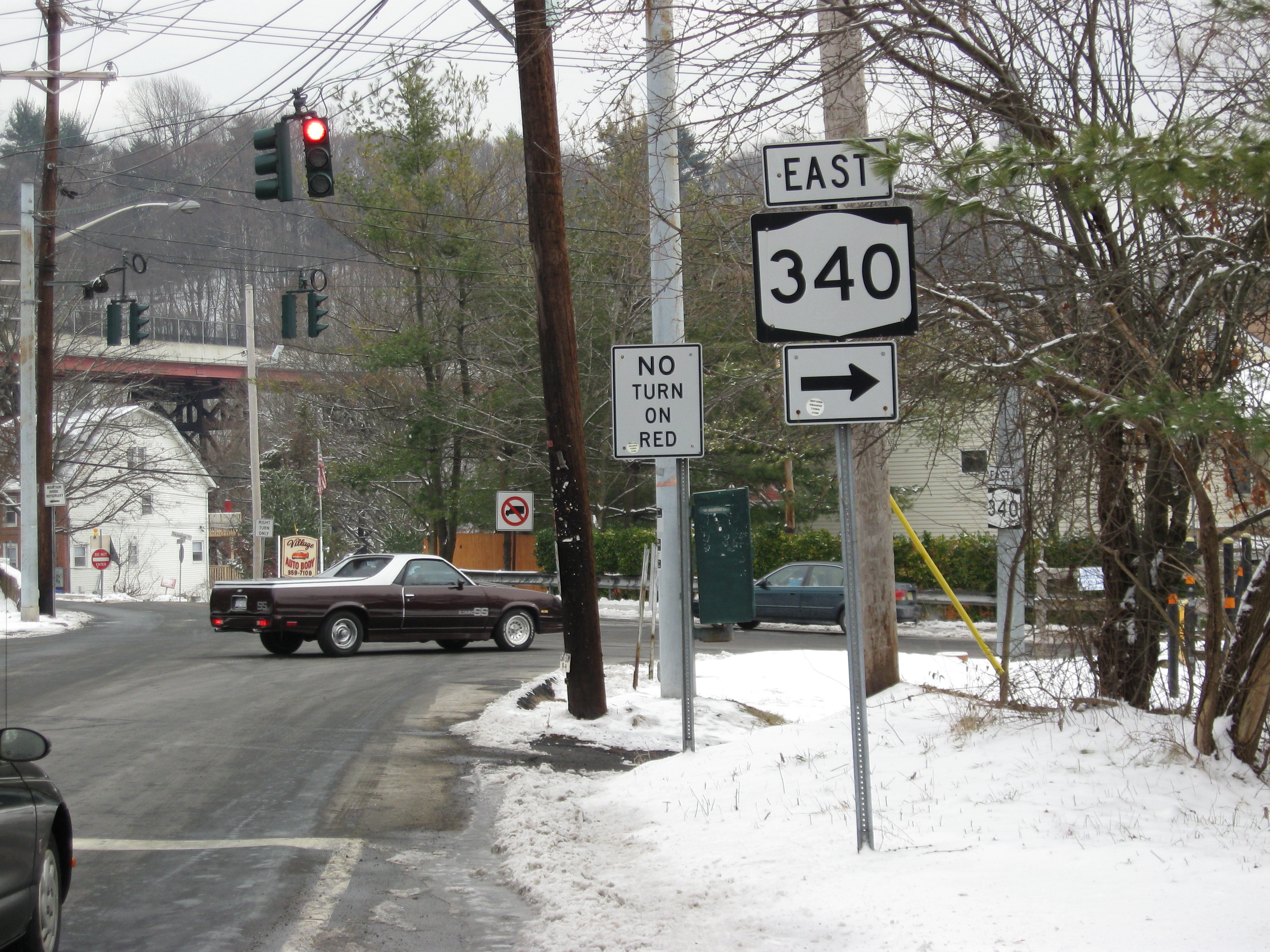
NY 340 eastbound as it heads into the village of Sparkill

The alignment that currently is modern NY 340 was first constructed in the early 1800s by local judge and entrepreneur Cornelius Blauvelt. The road was constructed to connect Tappan Landing (current-day Piermont) with then the settlement of Greenbush for purposes of transporting produce.

The portion of modern NY 340 south of Sparkill was originally designated as part of US 9W in 1927. At the time, US 9W continued south into New Jersey on what is now CR 501 and north from Sparkill on its modern alignment. By 1929, US 9W was realigned near the New York–New Jersey state line to run along the Hudson River from Fort Lee, New Jersey, to Sparkill. The former routing of US 9W between the state line and Sparkill was designated as NY 340 c. 1932. NY 340 was extended northwestward to its current northern terminus in the early 1940s.

== Major intersections ==
Despite NY 340 having an east-west designation, much of the route is north-south and its mileposts begin at its western terminus. The entire route is in Rockland County.

Location	mi	km	Destinations	Notes
Orangetown	3.10	4.99	NY 303 – Tappan, West Nyack, Congers	Western terminus; hamlet of Orangeburg
Orangetown			US 9W	Access via Hickey Street; hamlet of Orangeburg
Piermont	1.85	2.98	US 9W north	Access via Highland Avenue
Orangetown	0.60	0.97	US 9W south	Access via Highland Avenue
Orangetown	0.00	0.00	CR 501 south	Continuation into New Jersey
1.000 mi = 1.609 km; 1.000 km = 0.621 mi
