= Shore Front Parkway =

Avenue in Queens, New York

- Map of the Shore Front Parkway in red
- Length: 2.5 mi (4.0 km)
- Location: Arverne, Hammels,. Rockaway Beach
- From: Beach 73rd Street
- To: Beach 108th Street

Construction
- Commissioned: 1939

Shore Front Parkway is a 2.5-mile (4.0 km) beachfront road paralleling the Rockaway Beach and Boardwalk in the New York City borough of Queens, running between Beach 73rd Street and Beach 108th Street.

The parkway opened in 1939 after parks commissioner Robert Moses cleared a 200-foot-wide (61 m) strip of land north of the boardwalk. Moses demolished more than 700 buildings in the parkway's path and destroyed what he described as "catch-penny enterprises" along the boardwalk, replacing them with recreational fields. In the process, nearly half of the Rockaways' Playland amusement park was destroyed.

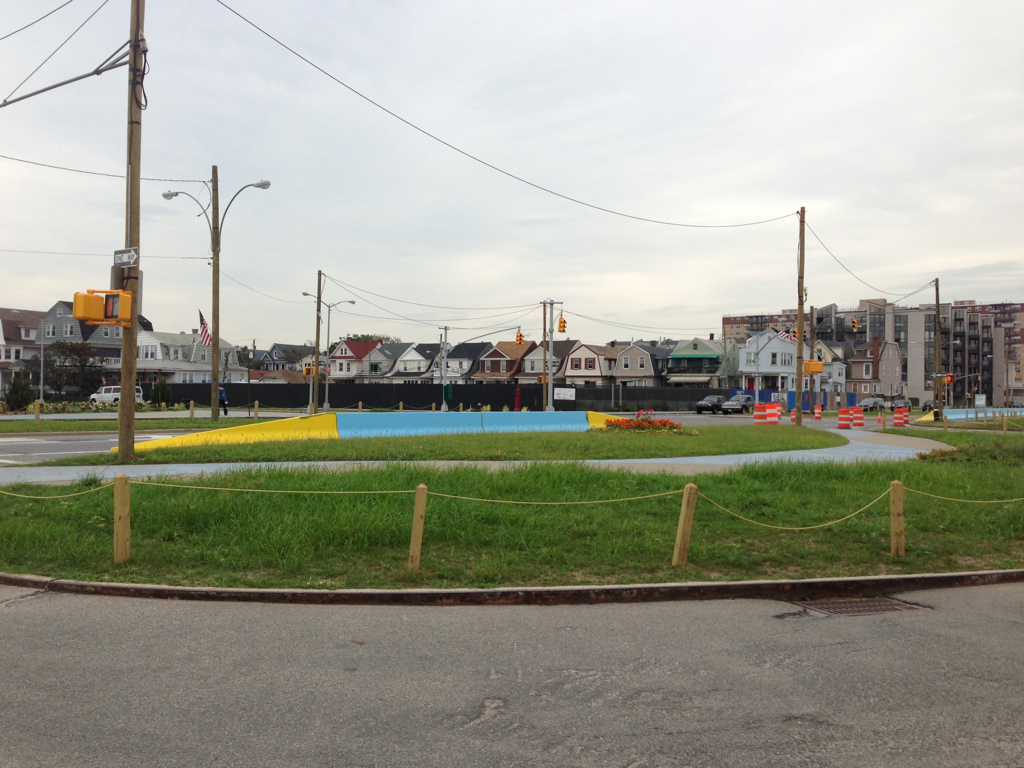
At Beach 94th Street

Often called the "road to nowhere" by Rockaway residents because its termini do not access any well-traveled locations, Shore Front Parkway was intended by Moses as a link in a never-completed grand shorefront drive extending from Brooklyn to the Hamptons. This project of Moses' was permanently thwarted in the 1960s when the National Park Service gained control of the bulk of Fire Island in Suffolk County, an essential link in the proposed highway, and decreed that it remain a permanently roadless National Seashore.

In July 2007, the New York City Department of Transportation announced that it would extend Shore Front Parkway through Beach 67th Street, where it would intersect with Rockaway Beach Boulevard. The extension, called Beach Front Road, was subsequently extended through to Beach 60th Street. The southernmost roadway of Shore Front Parkway accommodates a two-way protected bike path.

== See also ==
- List of reference routes in New York
