= Prospect Mountain Veterans Memorial Highway =

Highway in New York

Prospect Mountain Veterans Memorial Highway
- Map of the Lake George area with the Prospect Mountain Veterans Memorial Highway highlighted in red

Route information
- Maintained by NYSDEC
- Length: 5.88 mi (9.46 km)
- Existed: 1969–present

Major junctions
- South end: US 9 / NY 9N in Lake George
- North end: Peak of Prospect Mountain

Location
- Country: United States
- State: New York
- Counties: Warren

Highway system
- New York Highways; Interstate; US; State; Reference; Parkways

The Prospect Mountain Veterans Memorial Highway is a parkway located in the town of Lake George, New York. The road is 5.88 miles (9.46 km) long, running from U.S. Route 9 (US 9) to the peak of Prospect Mountain. Although the road is designated as New York State Route 917A, an unsigned reference route, by the New York State Department of Transportation, all maintenance on the roadway is performed by the New York State Department of Environmental Conservation.

== Route description ==
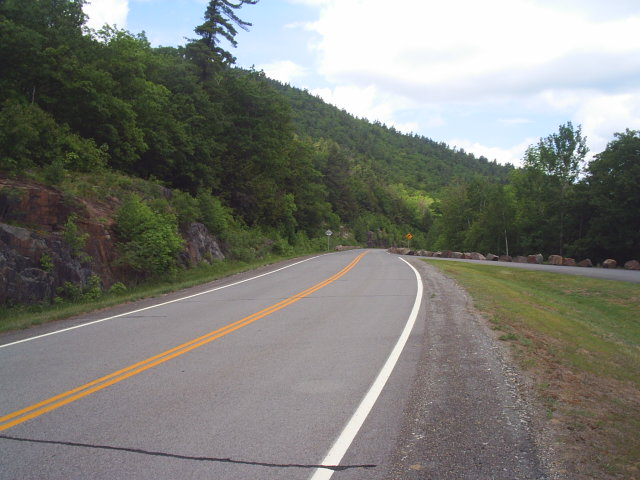
The Prospect Highway at one of the scenic overlooks along the mountainside

The parkway begins at an intersection with Routes 9 and 9N (Canada Street) in the town of Lake George. The parkway passes through a gate, heading up the base of Prospect Mountain. The route is very scenic, with trees on both sides of the road. Route 917A parallels Birch Ave., a street in Lake George. Soon after, the parkway passes over Interstate 87 (I-87, named the Adirondack Northway). The road expands to several lanes after the Northway, coming to a tollbooth. After the toll booth, the parkway begins to head up the mountain. With large heavy, stabilized rocks on both sides of the road, used as a guard rail to prevent danger (such as running off of the road), the parkway curves around the mountain, intersecting with several specialized scenic overlooks. The road curves around the several peaks of Prospect Mountain, coming to an end at the main peak at 5.88 miles (9.46 km), where a 100-mile (161 km) view can be seen. The furthest that can be seen are the Green Mountains in Vermont and the White Mountains in New Hampshire.

== History ==
Prospect Mountain originally had to use an incline railway car to access the house at the top where people could dance and eat. Construction on the railway began in January 1895 and cost $120,000 total. Construction was finished six months later, with the railway opening on June 15, 1895. After failing financially, the railway system ceased operation in 1903. The area was bought and soon donated to the State of New York. The nearby hiking trail that heads up towards the mountaintop is part of the old railway.

In 1932, the building at the top of the mountain burned down and was replaced by a steel fire tower. For 30 years, people studied what to do with the land, which was owned by the state, and in 1954, New York Governor Tom Dewey signed legislation to build a highway up the mountain. Twelve years later, in 1966, then-Governor Nelson Rockefeller made funds available for the highway. The Prospect Mountain Veterans Memorial Highway was opened in 1969, dedicated to war veterans and providing access to the 2,021-foot (616 m) summit with a 100-mile (161 km) view at its peak.

== Major intersections ==
The entire route is in Lake George, Warren County.

mi	km	Destinations	Notes
0.00	0.00	US 9 / NY 9N (Canada Street) to I-87	Southern terminus
5.88	9.46	Peak of Prospect Mountain	Northern terminus
1.000 mi = 1.609 km; 1.000 km = 0.621 mi
