= Prospect Mountain (Warren County, New York) =

Mountain in New York, US

- Location within New York Adirondack Park Location within the United States

Highest point
- Elevation: 2,018 feet (615 m)
- Coordinates: 43°25′29″N 73°44′44″W

Geography
- Location: Warren County, New York, U.S.
- Topo map: USGS Lake George

Prospect Mountain is a mountain located in the town of Lake George in Warren County, New York. New York State Route 917A, an unsigned reference route also known as Prospect Mountain Veterans Memorial Highway, is a toll road maintained by the New York State Department of Environmental Conservation and is the highway by which one reaches the summit at 5.88 miles (9.46 km), where a view for one hundred miles (160 km) can be seen.

== History ==
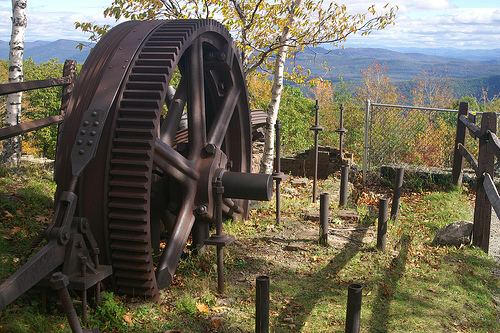
Cable gears for the old incline railway on Prospect Mountain

Prospect Mountain originally had to use an incline railway car to access the house at the top where people could dance and eat. Construction on the railway began in January 1895 and cost $120,000 total. Construction was finished six months later, with the railway opening on June 15, 1895. After failing financially, the railway system ceased operation in 1903. The area was bought by George Foster Peabody, who soon donated it to the State of New York. The nearby hiking trail that heads up towards the mountaintop is part of the old railway.

In July 1910, the Forest, Fish and Game Commission built a 35-foot-tall (11 m) wooden fire lookout tower on the mountain. At this time repairs and a new roof were done to the hotel building which was the headquarters for the observer. In 1932, the building at the top of the mountain burned down. The same year a 47-foot-tall (14 m) Aermotor LS40 steel fire lookout tower and observer cabin was built on the mountain by the Conservation Department. For 30 years, people studied what to do with the land, which was owned by the state, and in 1954, New York Governor Thomas E. Dewey signed legislation to build a highway up the mountain. Twelve years later, in 1966, then-Governor Nelson Rockefeller made funds available for the highway. The Prospect Mountain Veterans Memorial Highway was opened in 1969, dedicated to war veterans and providing access to the 2,018-foot (615 m) summit with a 100-mile (160 km) view at its peak. Due to increased use of aerial fire detection, the tower was closed at the end of the 1970 fire lookout season and later removed.

== Gallery ==
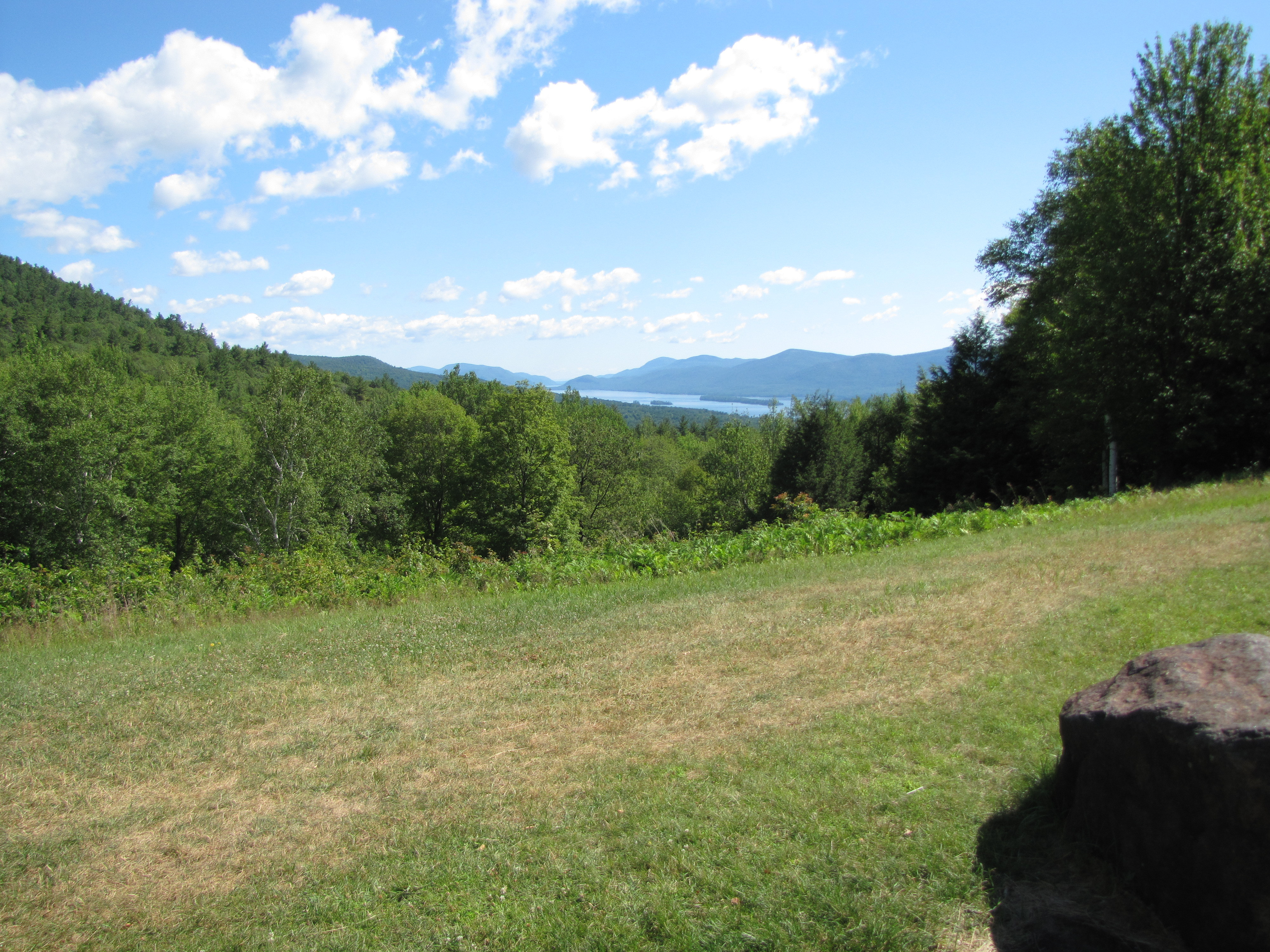
Prospect Mt. first overlook

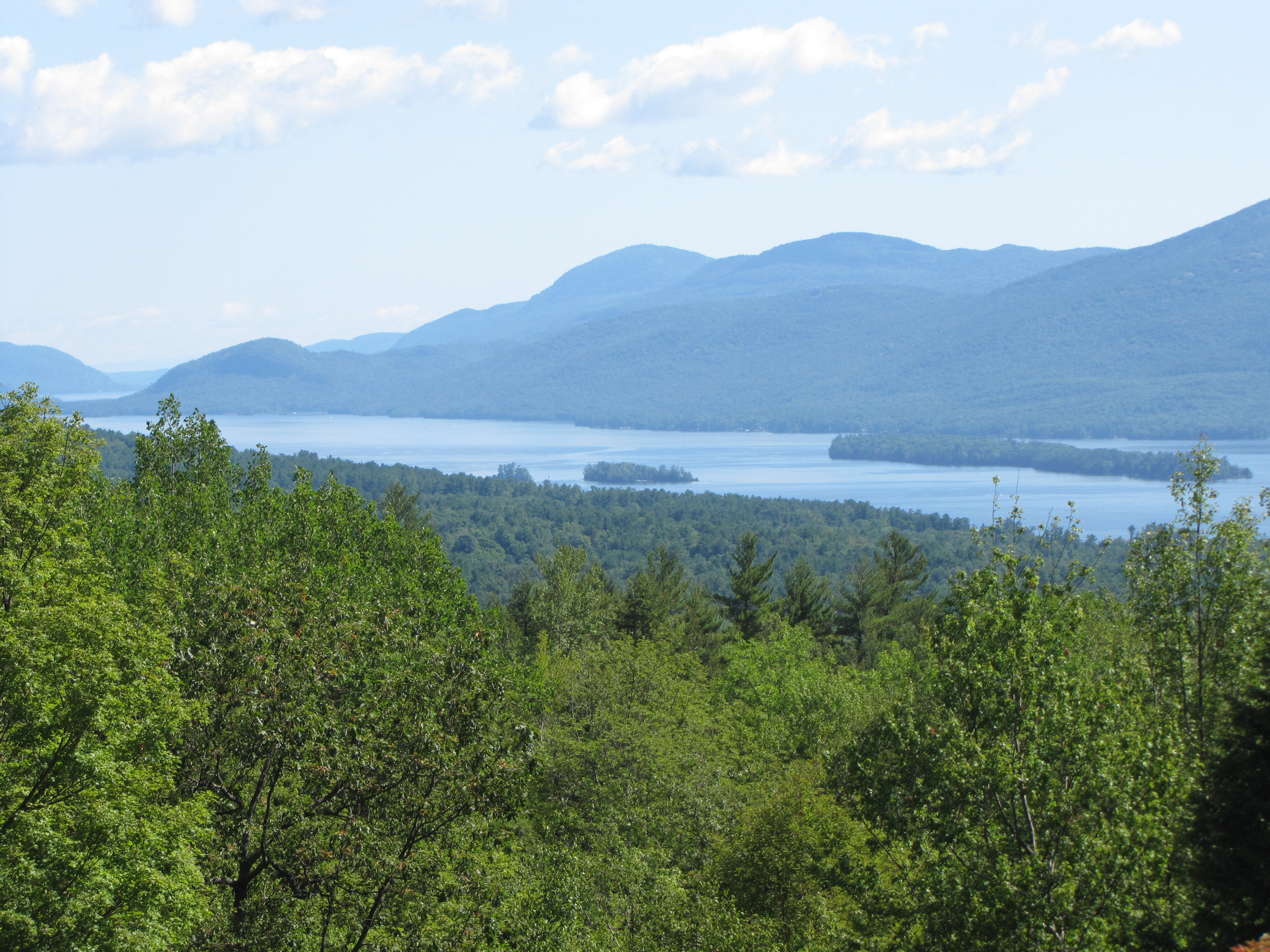
Prospect Mt. second overlook

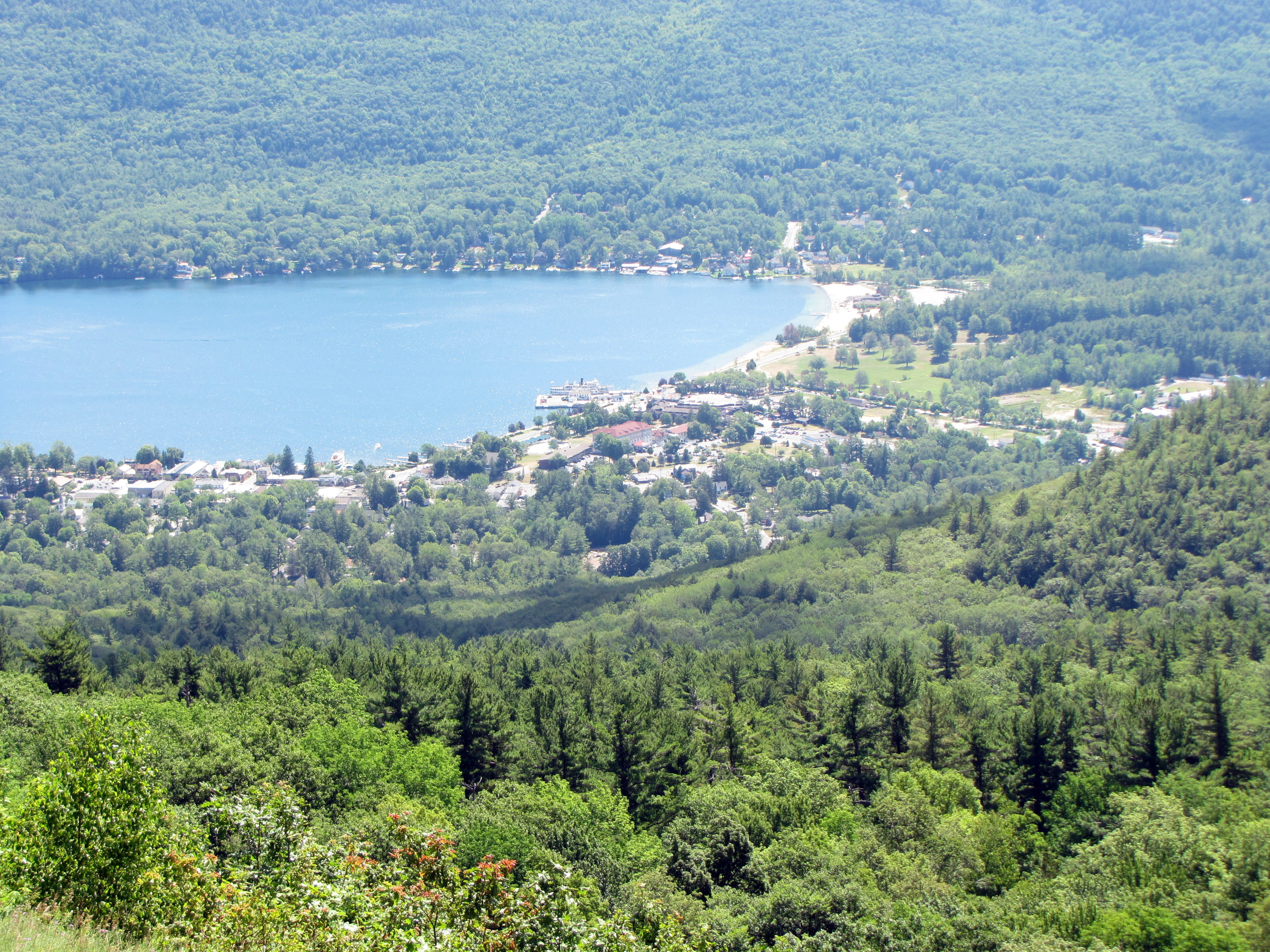
Prospect Mt. summit overlook

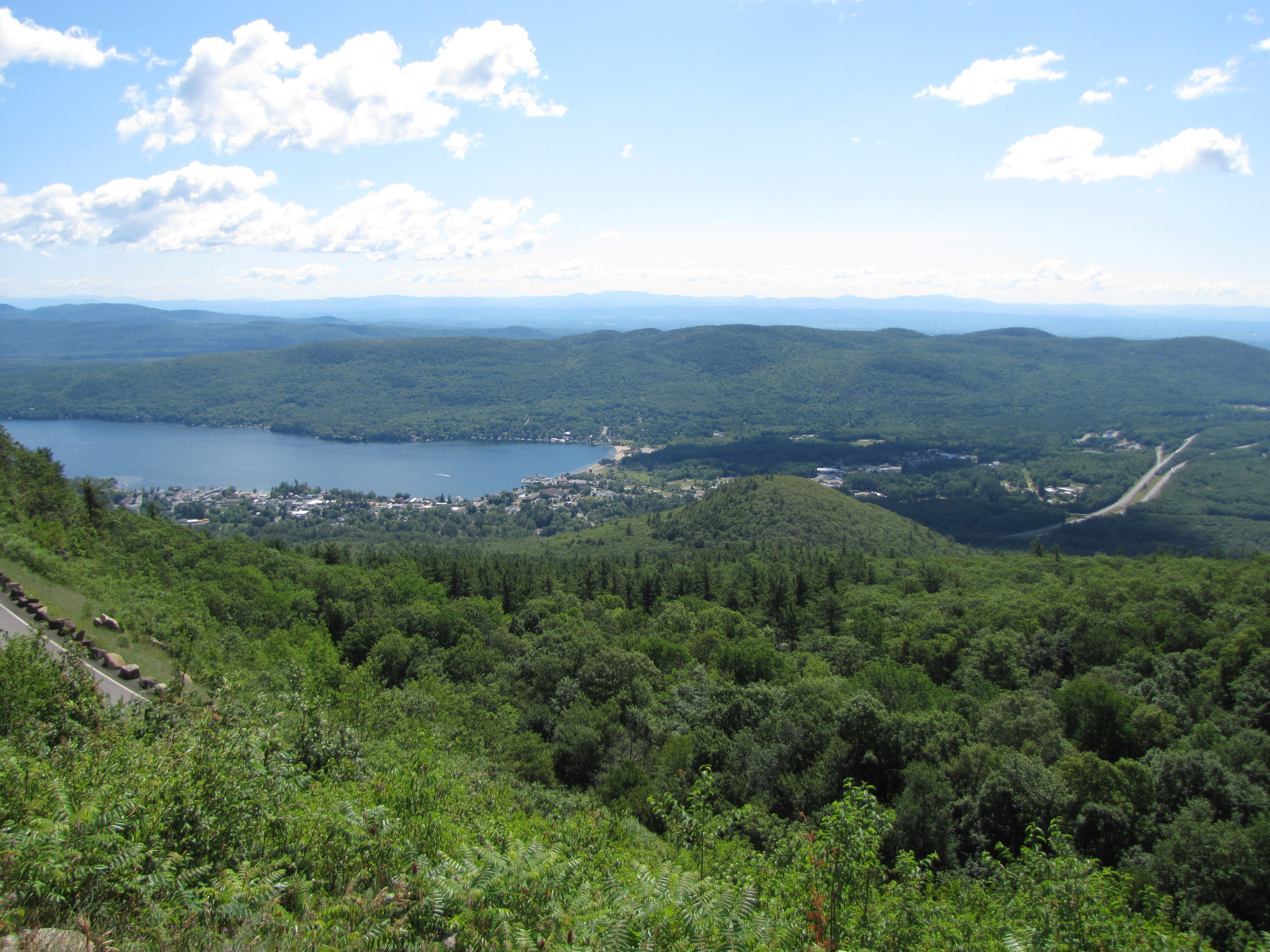
Prospect Mt. summit large overview

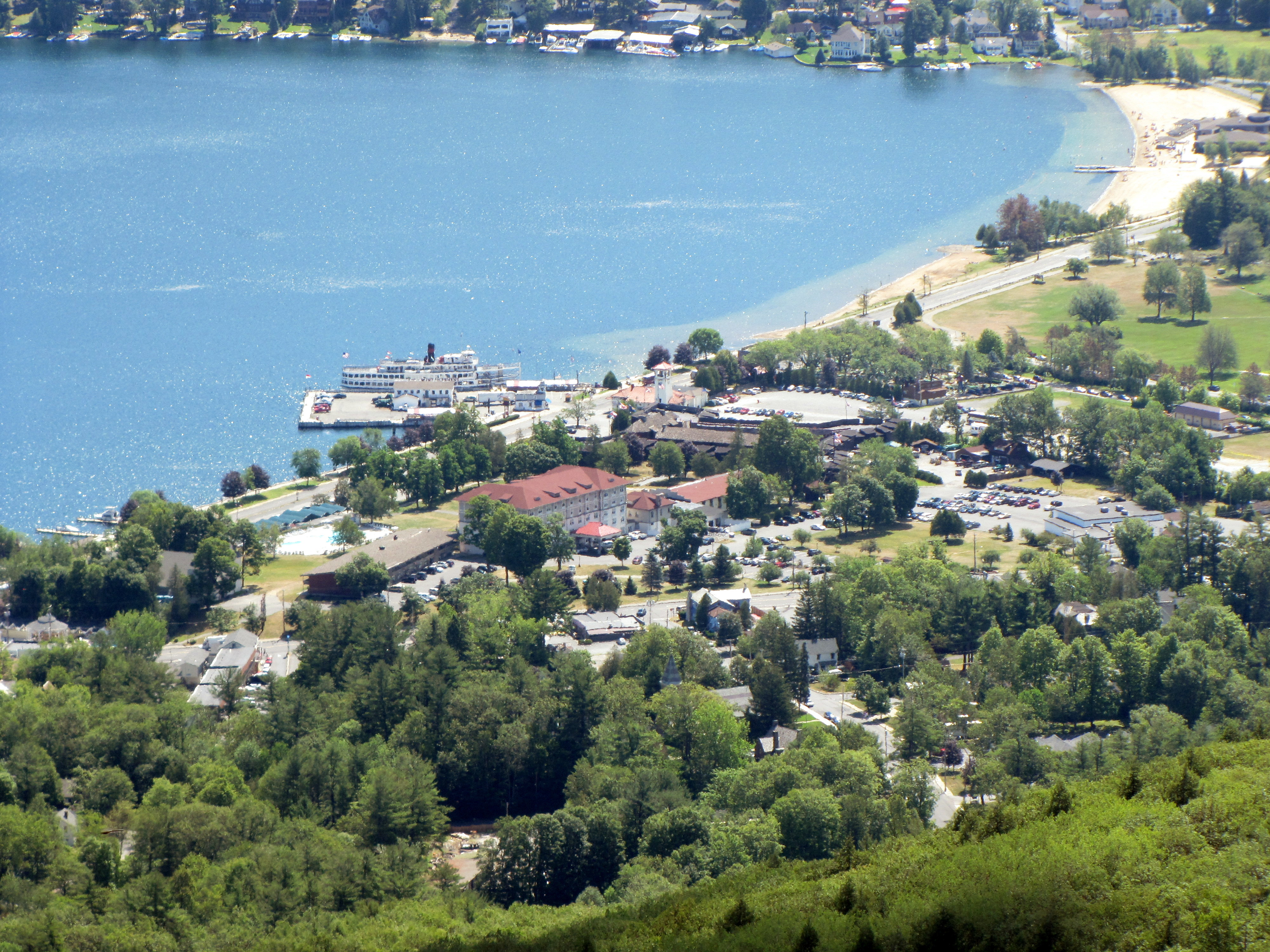
Prospect Mt. Lake George detail
