= Mount Prospect Methodist Church =

Historic church in Arkansas, United States

- Mt. Prospect Methodist Church
- U.S. National Register of Historic Places
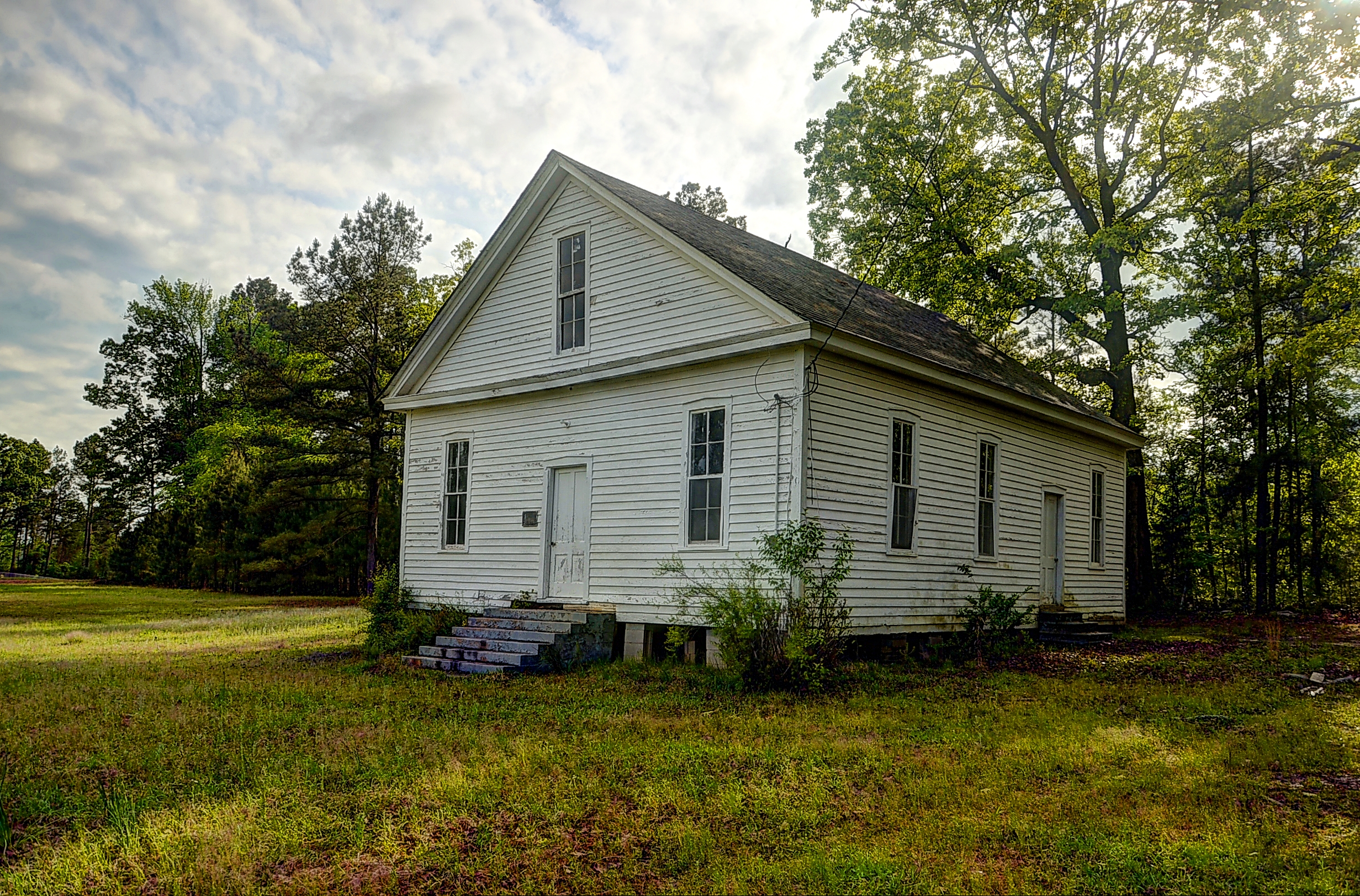

- Location within Arkansas Location within the United States
- Location: Jct. of Co. Rds. 446 and 61, Richland, Arkansas
- Coordinates: 33°22′9″N 93°4′32″W
- Area: 1.5 acres (0.61 ha)
- Built: 1886
- Architect: Pickering, John
- Architectural style: Greek Revival
- NRHP reference No.: 90000428
- Added to NRHP: March 22, 1990

The Mt. Prospect Methodist Church was designed by John Pickering in a Greek Revival style and was built in 1886. It was listed on the National Register of Historic Places in 1990.

It has been viewed as "the finest example in the local area of a vernacular Greek Revival church design."
