= Prospect Mountain (Minnesota) =

Mountain in Minnesota, United States

Coordinates: 48.0909°N 90.6425°W

Prospect Mountain is a peak in the Sawtooth Mountains of northeastern Minnesota, in the U.S. It is located between the west ends of Gunflint Lake and Loon Lake.
