= New York State Route 201 =

State highway in Broome County, New York, US

New York State Route 201
- Map of Broome County in the Southern Tier of New York with NY 201 highlighted in red, NY 991C in blue, and NY 990D in pink

Route information
- Maintained by NYSDOT
- Length: 2.08 mi (3.35 km)
- Existed: September 1971–present

Major junctions
- South end: NY 434 in Vestal
- North end: Future I-86 / NY 17 in Johnson City

Location
- Country: United States
- State: New York
- Counties: Broome

Highway system
- New York Highways; Interstate; US; State; Reference; Parkways
← NY 200	→ US 202

New York State Route 201 (NY 201) is a north–south state highway located west of the city of Binghamton in Broome County, New York. The southern terminus of the route is at NY 434 in Vestal while the northern terminus is at an interchange with NY 17 (future Interstate 86) in Johnson City.

== Route description ==
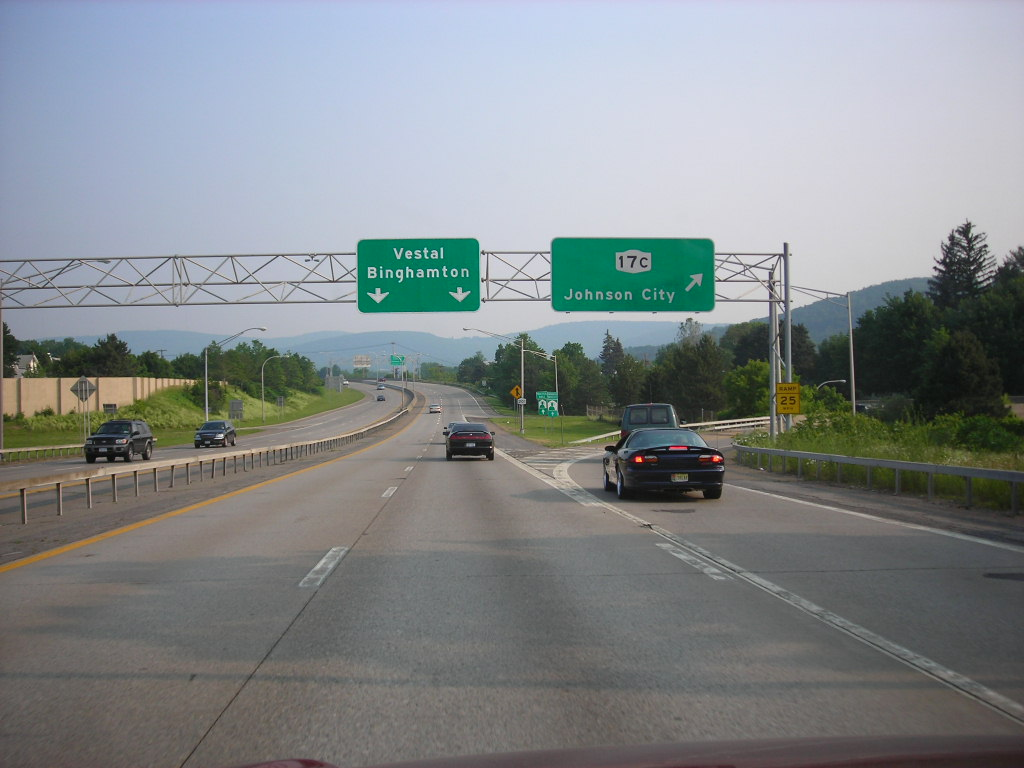
NY 201 southbound at the interchange with NY 17C in Johnson City

NY 201 begins at a trumpet interchange with NY 434 (Vestal Parkway) in the town of Vestal at the northern edge of Binghamton University. NY 201 proceeds northward as a four-lane freeway, crossing over County Route 44 (CR 44; Old Vestal Road), which is accessed via a ramp southbound, with no northbound access. NY 201 bends northeast, crossing the Susquehanna River via the C. Fred Johnson Bridge. After the bridge, NY 201 crosses over Boland Drive and enters an interchange with Riverside Drive, which is connected via a traffic circle in Johnson City. Continuing north through Johnson City, ramps from Riverside Drive merge in northbound, at which point, NY 201 crosses over the former Delaware, Lackawanna and Western Railroad main line tracks.

Continuing north through Johnson City, NY 201 remains a four-lane freeway, entering a folded diamond interchange with NY 17C (Main Street). After NY 17C, NY 201 crosses over Erie Railroad's former main line tracks, now maintained by Norfolk Southern as its Southern Tier Line. While crossing over the tracks, ramps accessing the Southern Tier Expressway (exit 70N of NY 17). At this interchange, the NY 201 designation terminates, while the right-of-way continues northward as NY 991C, a reference route, until the intersection with Harry L. Drive in Johnson City.

== History ==
In 1908, the New York State Legislature created Route 4, an unsigned legislative route extending from Westfield in the west to Highland Falls in the east. Route 4 entered the Binghamton area on modern NY 17C and followed Riverside Drive, Washington Street, Susquehanna Street, and Court Street into and through downtown before leaving the city on what is now U.S. Route 11. The Riverside Drive segment of old Route 4 was designated as New York State Route 17H by 1940. NY 17H began at NY 17C in Johnson City and ended at NY 17, then routed on Washington Street, in downtown Binghamton. NY 17 was rerouted slightly by 1947 to cross the Susquehanna River on Exchange Street, resulting in a short extension of NY 17H along Washington and Susquehanna Streets.

A new highway crossing the Susquehanna River from Vestal to Johnson City opened to traffic in 1954. It began at NY 17 and continued northeast across the river to a terminus at NY 17H. In September 1971, the Vestal–Johnson City arterial and the portion of Riverside Drive north of that highway was redesignated as NY 201. The remainder of NY 17H west of the Binghamton city limits became NY 990D, an unsigned reference route.

Originally, traffic along NY 201 emptied into a traffic circle located in Johnson City near the Susquehanna's north bank. This hazardous situation was rectified in 2004 when the size of the traffic circle was reduced to allow for a flyover to be built northwest of the circle. With the flyover in place, traffic on NY 201 can continue on the road without entering the traffic circle. The circle is still accessible via exits from the NY 201 bypass.

== Exit list ==
The entire route is in Broome County. All exits are unnumbered.

Location	mi	km	Destinations	Notes
Vestal	0.00	0.00	NY 434 – Binghamton University, Vestal	Southern terminus; trumpet interchange
Vestal	0.45	0.72	Vestal Road / Bunn Hill Road	Southbound exit and northbound entrance
Johnson City	1.02	1.64	Riverside Drive ( NY 990D – Binghamton) / Floral Avenue ( NY 990E)	
Johnson City	1.75	2.82	NY 17C – Endwell, Johnson City	Folded diamond interchange
Johnson City	2.08	3.35	Future I-86 / NY 17 – Binghamton, Corning	Northern terminus; cloverleaf interchange
1.000 mi = 1.609 km; 1.000 km = 0.621 mi: Incomplete access
