= New York State Route 961F =

Highway in New York

New York State Route 961F
- Map of Allegany and Steuben counties with NY 961F highlighted in red

Route information
- Maintained by NYSDOT
- Length: 5.90 mi (9.50 km)
- Existed: mid-1970s–present

Major junctions
- West end: NY 70 in Burns
- East end: NY 36 in Arkport

Location
- Country: United States
- State: New York
- Counties: Allegany, Steuben

Highway system
- New York Highways; Interstate; US; State; Reference; Parkways
← NY 895	→ NY 962J

New York State Route 961F (NY 961F) is a reference route in the Southern Tier of New York in the United States. It extends for 5.90 miles (9.50 km) from an intersection with NY 70 east of the Allegany County village of Canaseraga to a junction with NY 36 in the Steuben County village of Arkport. Although NY 961F follows a mostly north–south alignment, it is inventoried as an east–west route by the New York State Department of Transportation (NYSDOT). Unlike most reference routes, NY 961F is signed as a touring route. The highway was part of NY 38 in the 1920s and part of NY 70 from the 1930s to the 1970s.

== Route description ==
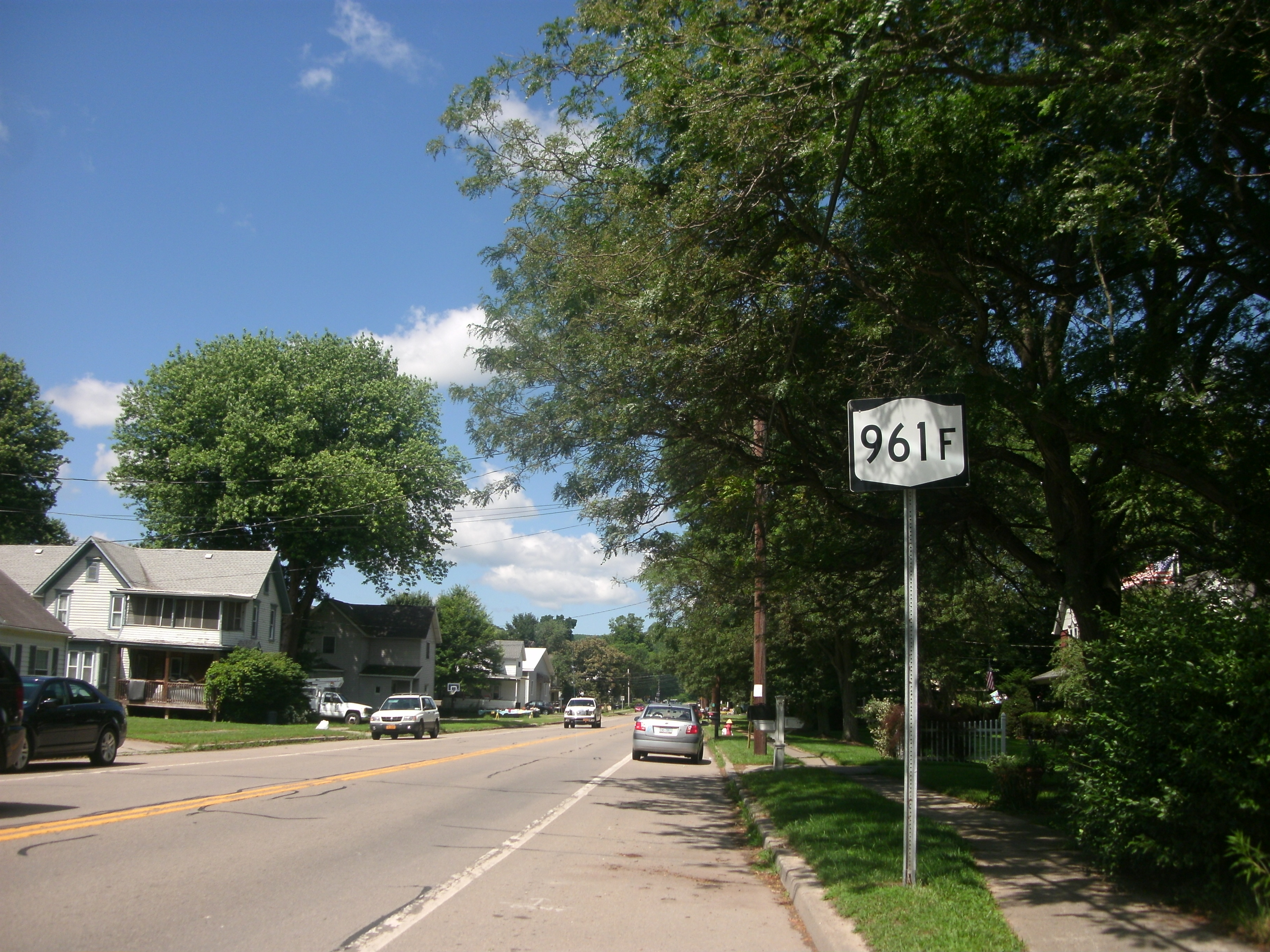
NY 961F proceeding west from its terminus, NY 36, in Arkport

NY 961F begins just east of the village of Canaseraga at an intersection with NY 70 in the town of Burns. The route heads southward, crossing the Norfolk Southern Railway-owned Southern Tier Line by way of an overpass prior to curving southeastward at the base of Tildon Hill, a mountain peaking at 1,800 feet (550 m) above sea level. Over the next 2 miles (3.2 km), the highway heads slightly southeastward, running along the western edge of an undeveloped valley formed by Tildon Hill to the west and another plateau 1.5 miles (2.4 km) to the east. This section of the route loosely parallels the Southern Tier Line, which runs through the marshy center of the gully. As NY 961F approaches the Allegany–Steuben County line, it bypasses the hamlet of Burns, a railside community situated 0.5 miles (0.8 km) to the east on Burns Road (County Route 14).

The terrain surrounding the highway remains the same in the Steuben County town of Dansville, where the route takes on a slightly more easterly alignment as the valley narrows in width. It eventually comes within view of the rail line, at which point the road turns back to the southeast and follows the Southern Tier Line along the western edge of a marsh known as The Muck. During this stretch, NY 961F encounters its first pocket of development, consisting of a small handful of isolated farms and homes. The buildings give way to open fields in the town of Hornellsville, where the route encounters the Canisteo River and enters the village of Arkport about 0.5 miles (0.8 km) into the town. NY 961F turns east at the river, becoming West Avenue as it crosses the Southern Tier Line at-grade and runs past closely spaced homes on both sides of the road. The route soon reaches the village center, where it ends at a junction with NY 36.

== History ==
What is now NY 961F was state-maintained as early as 1920, by which time the highway had been designated as a spur of Route 15, an unsigned legislative route extending from Hornell to Scottsville. The spur route was eliminated on March 1, 1921. In the mid-1920s, the former spur became part of NY 38, an east–west highway extending from Angelica to Penn Yan via Canaseraga and Arkport. In the 1930 renumbering of state highways in New York, NY 38 was reassigned elsewhere in the state while its former routing became part of several new routes. One of these was NY 70, which began at Whitney Crossings (now Garwoods) and passed through Canaseraga and Arkport on its way to Kanona. NY 70 was realigned in the mid-1970s to follow what had been NY 70A east from Canaseraga. Its former routing between Canaseraga and Arkport became reference route NY 961F.

== Major intersections ==
County	Location	mi	km	Destinations	Notes
Allegany	Burns	0.00	0.00	NY 70	Western terminus
Steuben	Arkport	5.90	9.50	NY 36 (New Main Street) to I-86 / NY 17	Eastern terminus
1.000 mi = 1.609 km; 1.000 km = 0.621 mi

== See also ==
- NY 962J, NY 990L, and NY 990V – Other reference routes signed as touring routes
