= New York State Route 990L =

State highway in New York State

New York State Route 990L
- NY 990L highlighted in red

Route information
- Maintained by NYSDOT
- Length: 1.43 mi (2.30 km)
- History: Added to state highway system in 1954

Major junctions
- West end: NY 12 in Norwich city
- East end: NY 23 in Norwich town

Location
- Country: United States
- State: New York
- Counties: Chenango

Highway system
- New York Highways; Interstate; US; State; Reference; Parkways
← I-990	→ NY 990V

New York State Route 990L (NY 990L) is a reference route in Chenango County, New York, in the United States. The western terminus of the route is at an intersection with NY 12 in the city of Norwich. Its eastern terminus is at a junction with NY 23 in the town of Norwich. NY 990L is one of four reference routes in New York that has been signed as a touring route. The highway is known as East Main Street in the city of Norwich and as East River Road in the town of Norwich. Both roads were designated state arterial highways in 1954, requiring the state to pay for all maintenance on the roads.

== Route description ==
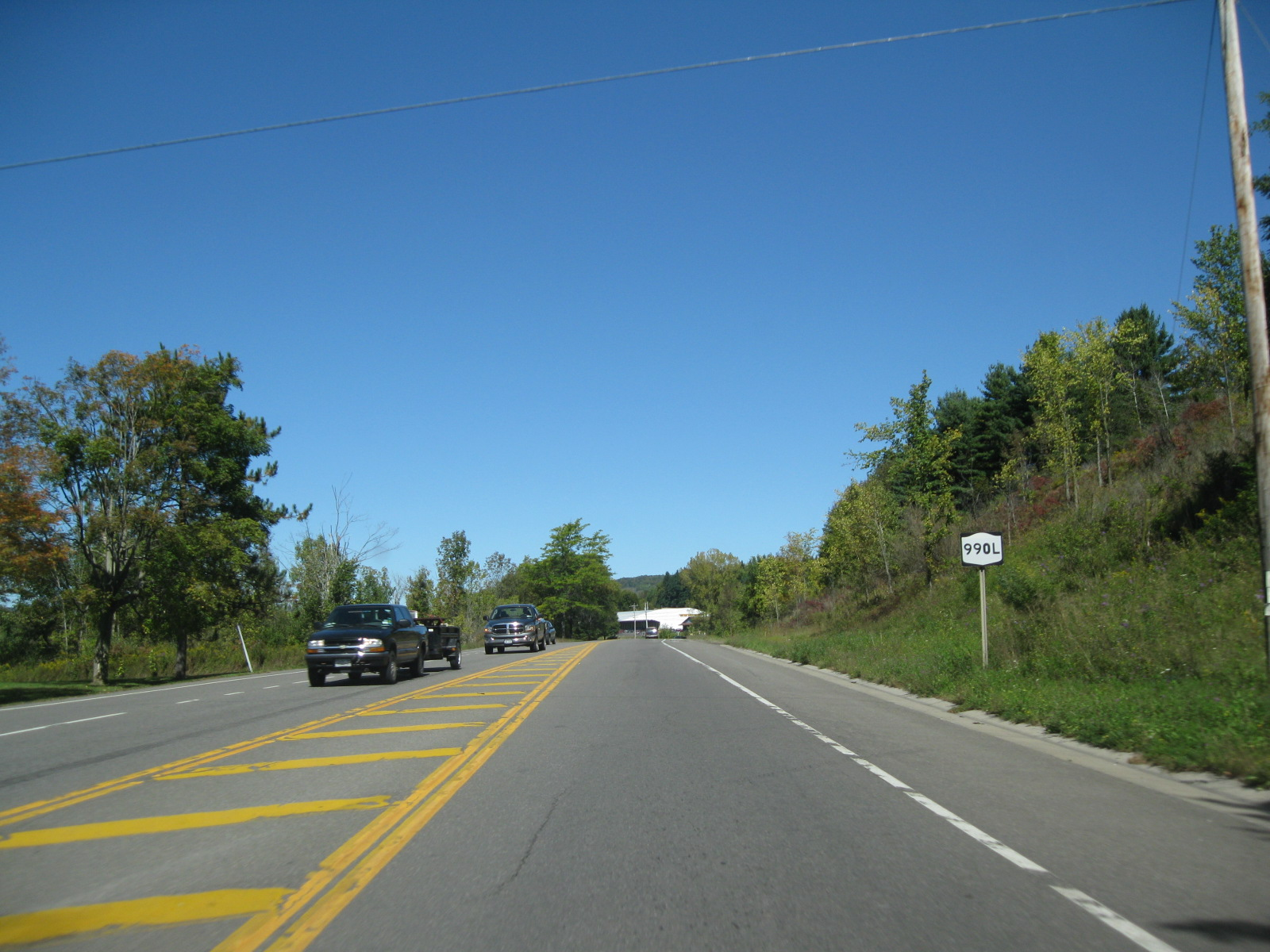
NY 990L and one of its two mis-signed shields along the alignment

NY 990L begins at an intersection with NY 12 (Broad Street) and West Main Street (former NY 319) in the downtown district of the city of Norwich. The route heads east along East Main Street, passing through the eastern portion of the city. NY 990L exits the city and enters the surrounding town of Norwich upon crossing the Chenango River. On the eastern riverbank, NY 990L intersects the lengthy County Route 32 (CR 32, named East River Road). The CR 32 designation ends here, giving way to the state-maintained NY 990L as the latter turns north onto East River Road.

The River Road portion of NY 990L is initially less developed as it passes by riverside homes to the west and forested mountains to the east. Near a junction known as Hawley Corners, the amount of development along the highway increases as NY 990L passes by warehouses and small commercial establishments. At Hawley Corners itself, NY 990L ends at NY 23 and East River Road becomes CR 32 once more. Typically, reference routes are not signed; however, NY 990L is one of four such routes in New York that is at least partially signed. The East River Road stretch of NY 990L is the only section of the route that is signed; no other signs exist, including on NY 12 and NY 23 as reassurance markers.

== History ==
=== Origins ===
In 1948, the state of New York surveyed roads in the city of Norwich to determine which streets should be made state highways. The survey was part of a statewide effort to rebuild major through-traffic city streets as state-maintained arterial highways. Ultimately, however, the city was tasked with deciding which streets would be included in the arterial highway program. By 1951, the city of Norwich had proposed making Broad Street (NY 12) a state highway as part of the program. As an arterial highway, Broad Street would be widened by as much as 18 feet (5.5 m), resulting in a 44-foot (13 m) wide road. The plan was opposed by the city's traffic commission in January 1951, which believed that the widening would negatively impact the city's appearance by requiring the removal of any landscaping between the road and its sidewalks, including roadside trees.

The commission countered with a proposal calling for the construction of a new highway along the east bank of the Chenango River that bypassed downtown. Since the bypass would not enter the city limits, the proposed road was not eligible for the arterial highway program. By 1953, the city developed a new plan that gave Broad Street to the state while also establishing East Main Street and the section of East River Road between Main Street and NY 23 as arterial highways. The latter two routes would comprise an eastern bypass of northern Norwich while falling within the criteria for the arterial highway program. The revised proposal was approved by city voters by a 641–250 vote in 1953, allowing for bills to add the roads as state highways to enter the New York State Legislature in January 1954. Both were approved and signed into law by Governor Thomas E. Dewey within two months.

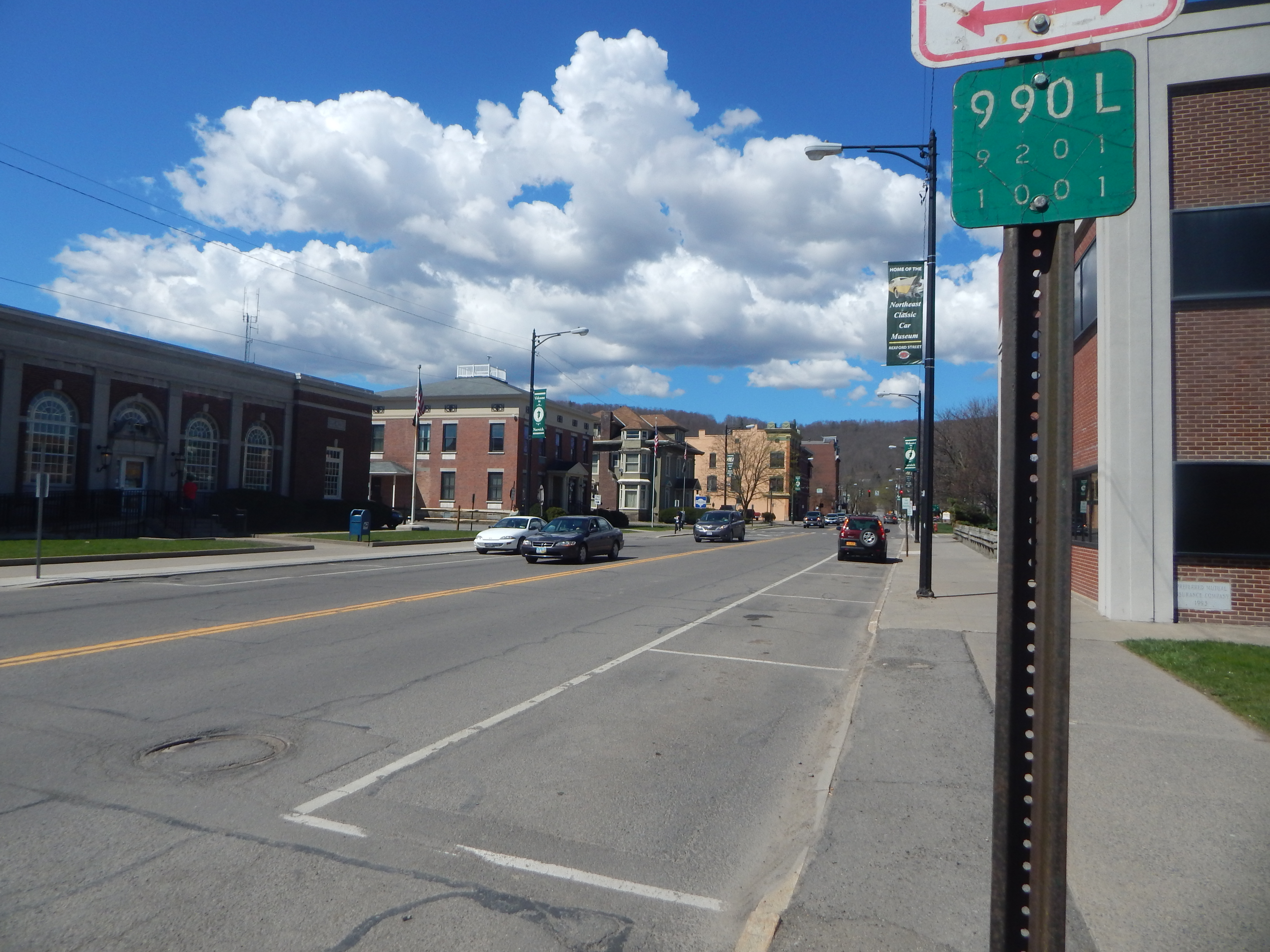
NY 990L west along East Main Street in Norwich

Originally, the state had planned on transferring maintenance of a state highway to Chenango County to offset the mileage acquired by taking over part of East River Road, which had previously been county-maintained. One segment considered for the transfer was the piece of NY 23 between the eastern city line of Norwich and East River Road; however, this part of the route was ultimately retained as a state road.

=== Reconstruction ===
Design plans for all of Norwich's arterial highways, including East Main Street, called for the roads to be widened to 36 feet (11 m), an increase of up to 8 feet (2.4 m) in some locations. Additionally, in the vicinity of the Chenango River, East Main Street would be realigned slightly to take a northeasterly track across a new bridge over the river. As a result, the reconfigured East Main Street would meet East River Road at a point slightly north of the existing intersection between the two highways. The total cost of reconstructing East River Road, Broad Street, and Main Street was estimated at $952,800 (equivalent to $11.2 million in 2024), of which all but $3,350 would be paid for by the state. Work began in October 1954 with a $250,000 project (equivalent to $2.93 million in 2024) rebuilding the part of North Broad Street between Mitchell Street and the northern city line. It was completed in 1955.

Construction on the other arterial routes progressed at a much slower pace. After learning that none of the city's arterial streets would see work in 1956, the city of Norwich lobbied the state to add at least part of the project to the year's construction schedule. The delay was attributed to a lack of state funds; however, Norwich Mayor Frank Portelli claimed that work had not been halted on other cities' arterial routes and that Norwich was simply being passed over. A project to improve the remaining arterial highways was finally developed by the state and presented to Norwich officials in January 1958. The highways would now be 40 to 64 feet (12 to 20 m) wide within the city and 24 feet (7.3 m) wide with shoulders 10 feet (3.0 m) in width outside of the city.

As a result of the increased highway width, the project required the removal of 94 trees along Broad Street, a development the city had tried to avoid in 1951. This time, however, the Norwich city council approved the project even though the tree removal plans were opposed by hundreds of city residents. In supporting the project, the city noted that maintenance of Broad Street would be funded by the state after the project was finished due to the street's status as an arterial highway. Additionally, the council believed that the rebuilding of Norwich's arterial highways would stimulate business within the city. Construction on the $700,000 project (equivalent to $7.55 million in 2024) began in January 1959 and continued through at least 1961, when the new bridge carrying East Main Street over the Chenango River was completed.

== Major intersections ==
The entire route is in Chenango County.

Location	mi	km	Destinations	Notes
City of Norwich	0.00	0.00	NY 12 (South Broad Street) – Binghamton, Sherburne, Utica	Western terminus
Town of Norwich	0.89	1.43	CR 32 (East River Road)	
Town of Norwich	1.43	2.30	NY 23 / CR 32 – Norwich, Oneonta	East River Road continues north as CR 32
1.000 mi = 1.609 km; 1.000 km = 0.621 mi

== See also ==
- NY 961F, NY 962J, and NY 990V – Other reference routes signed as touring routes
