= New York State Route 990V =

Highway in New York

New York State Route 990V
- Map of the Catskill Mountains and vicinity with NY 990V highlighted in red

Route information
- Maintained by NYSDOT
- Length: 6.15 mi (9.90 km)
- History: Designated as part of NY 342 from 1930 to 1940s

Major junctions
- West end: NY 30 in Gilboa
- CR 39 in West Conesville
- East end: CR 3 / CR 18 in Conesville

Location
- Country: United States
- State: New York
- Counties: Schoharie

Highway system
- New York Highways; Interstate; US; State; Reference; Parkways
← NY 990L	→ US 1
← NY 341	NY 200	→ NY 342

New York State Route 990V (NY 990V) is an east–west reference route in Schoharie County, New York, in the United States. It extends for 6.15 miles (9.90 km) from an intersection with NY 30 in the town of Gilboa to a junction with County Route 18 (CR 18) in the town of Conesville, where the road continues east as CR 3. Reference routes in New York are typically unsigned; however, NY 990V is fully signed with touring route markers. The road is a remnant of New York State Route 342, a route assigned as part of the 1930 renumbering of state highways in New York. The NY 342 designation was removed in the late 1940s; however, its former routing from Gilboa to Conesville remained a state highway and became NY 990V when the modern reference route system in New York was created.

== Route description ==
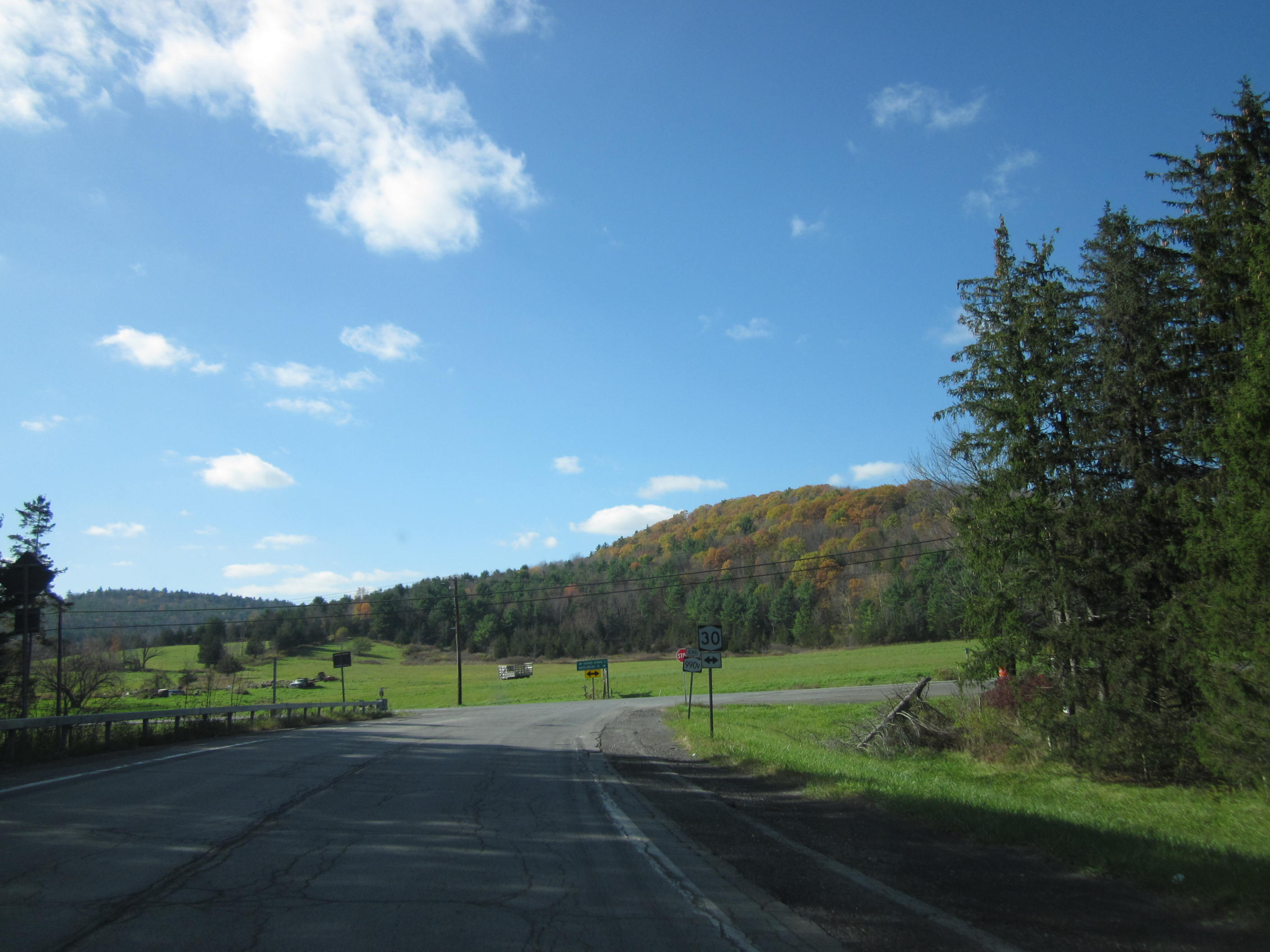
Approaching the western terminus of NY 990V at NY 30 in Gilboa

NY 990V begins northwest of the Schoharie Reservoir at an intersection with NY 30 in the town of Gilboa. The route heads northeast around the reservoir as a two-lane highway, intersecting CR 13 (Stryker Road) in an area of open fields before crossing Schoharie Creek a short distance downstream from the Gilboa Dam. On the opposite bank of the creek, the highway quickly passes through the small hamlet of Gilboa, located at a junction with CR 17 (Flat Creek Road). Outside of Gilboa, NY 990V turns to the southeast, paralleling the eastern edge of the reservoir as it runs through a stretch of forests and passes directly south of Gilboa-Conesville Central School. The wooded areas give way to slightly more open terrain in the adjacent town of Conesville, where the route meets CR 39 (Prattsville Road) just east of the town line. CR 39 heads south from this point, taking over as the primary waterside roadway while NY 990V heads east into a valley surrounding Manor Kill.

Not far from CR 39, the route enters the hamlet of West Conesville, another small community built up around NY 990V's junction with CR 59 (Bull Hill Road). The road continues northeastward from West Conesville, serving a handful of scattered homes separated by stretches of woodland and open fields. This sparsely developed section along the northern bank of Manor Kill ultimately leads to the hamlet of Conesville, located at an intersection with CR 18 (Bear Kill Road). NY 990V ends at the junction, and its right-of-way continues east toward NY 145 in Durham as CR 3 (Potter Mountain Road). Reference routes in New York are typically not signed with touring route markers, as most are short connector roads or are known by other, more prominent names. NY 990V, however, is fully signed as a touring route.

== History ==
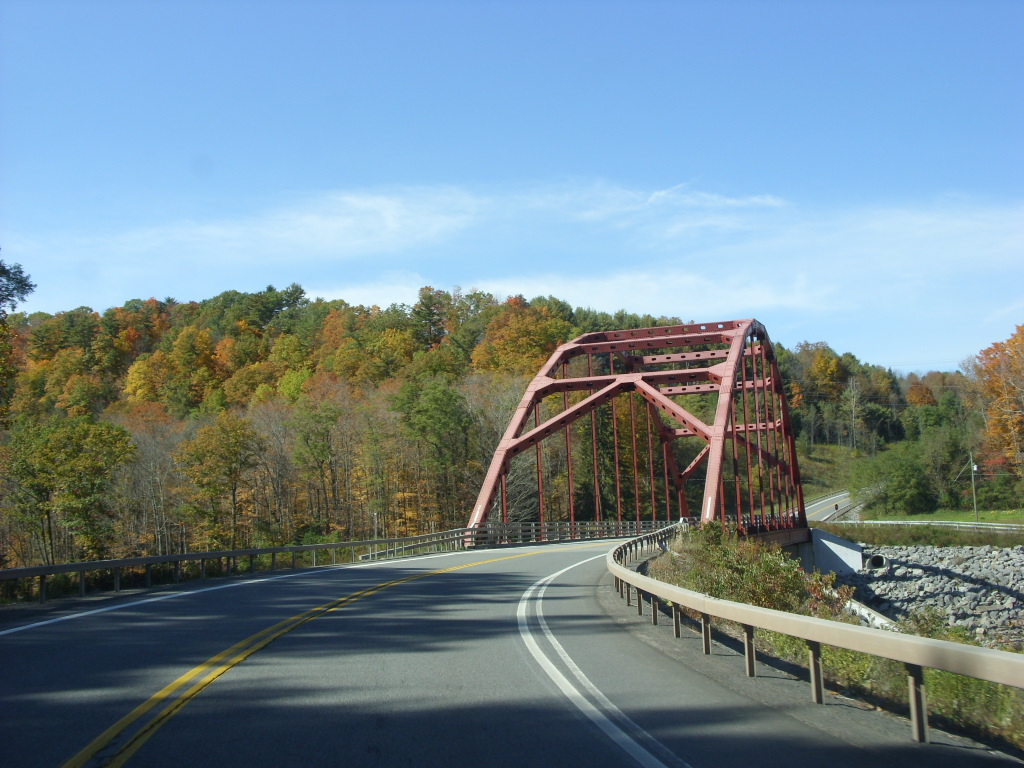
Crossing Schoharie Creek on NY 990V westbound

Modern NY 990V was gradually taken over by the state of New York over the course of the early 20th century. The portion east of Schoharie Creek became state-maintained on August 28, 1917, following a $46,774 project (equivalent to $1,147,968 in 2024) to improve the existing road to state highway standards. The rest of the highway was added as a state road in the late 1920s. In the 1930 renumbering of state highways in New York, the Gilboa–Conesville state highway was designated as part of NY 342, a new route extending from NY 30 west of the hamlet of Gilboa to the Conesville hamlet of Manorkill.

By the following year, NY 342 was truncated westward to the hamlet of Conesville while a highway between NY 23 near South Gilboa and NY 30 southwest of Gilboa was designated as NY 297. The NY 297 designation was short-lived as it was removed c. 1936. NY 342 was extended westward over the former routing of NY 297 in the mid-1940s; however, the designation was eliminated in the late 1940s. While the portion west of NY 30 became CR 14, the section east of NY 30 was retained as a state highway. When the modern reference route system was created, the Gilboa–Conesville state highway was designated as NY 990V.

== Major intersections ==
The entire route is in Schoharie County.

Location	mi	km	Destinations	Notes
Gilboa	0.00	0.00	NY 30 – Grand Gorge, Middleburgh	Western terminus
Conesville	6.15	9.90	CR 18 north (Bear Kill Road) / CR 3 east (Potter Mountain Road) to NY 145	Continues east as CR 3; southern terminus of CR 18
1.000 mi = 1.609 km; 1.000 km = 0.621 mi

== See also ==
- List of county routes in Schoharie County, New York
- NY 961F, NY 962J, and NY 990L – Other reference routes signed as touring routes
