= List of state routes in New York =

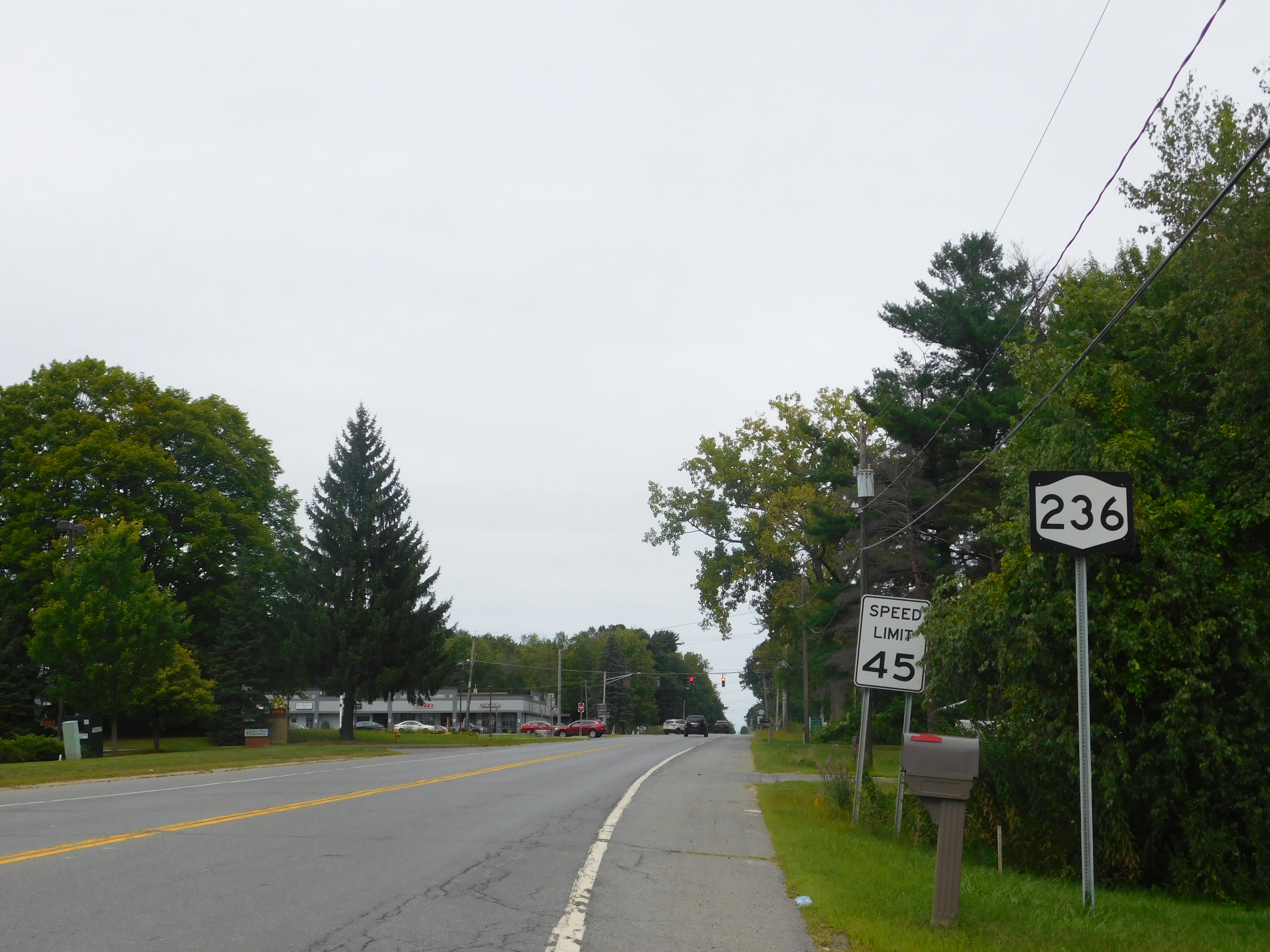
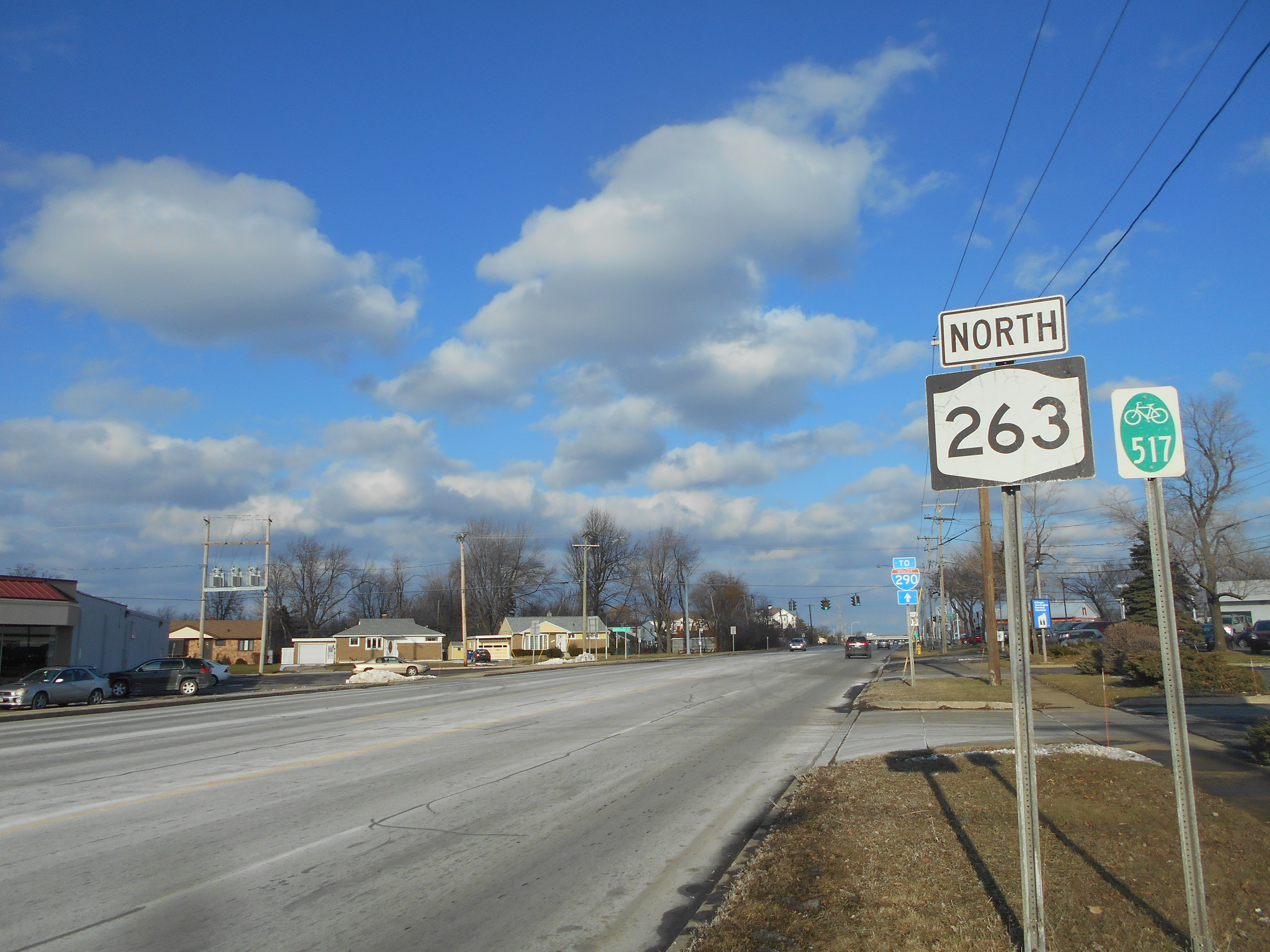
- Standard signage for state routes, auxiliary state routes, and reference routes

Highway names
- Interstates: Interstate X (I-X)
- US Highways: U.S. Route X (US X)
- State: New York State Route X (NY Route X; NY X)

System links
- New York Highways; Interstate; US; State; Reference; Parkways

The following is a list of numbered state highways in the U.S. state of New York. Signed state highways in New York, referred to as "touring routes" by the New York State Department of Transportation, are numbered from 1 to 899. A large number of unsigned state highways, known as "reference routes", are numbered from 900 to 999 and carry a suffix. Four reference routes have been signed as touring routes and as such are listed on this page.

The first set of routes in New York were assigned in 1924, replacing a series of unsigned legislative routes that had existed since 1908. Initially, there were only 29 routes; by the late 1920s, there were several dozen highways. In the 1930 state highway renumbering, some of these routes were reconfigured or renumbered while hundreds of other, smaller routes were assigned. Since that time, routes have been added and removed from the state highway system at various times for reasons ranging from the construction and/or removal of highways to the result of "maintenance swaps", or transfers of highway maintenance from the state of New York to lower levels of government and vice versa. State-maintained portions of routes have reference markers, small, green signs that are posted approximately every one-tenth mile along the side of the roadway.

== Current routes ==
Route	Length (mi)	Length (km)	From	To	Formed	Notes
NY 2	30.85	49.65	I-87 / NY 7 in Colonie	MA 2 at the Massachusetts line at Petersburgh	1942	
NY 3	245.90	395.74	NY 104A in Sterling	US 9 in Plattsburgh	1924	
NY 3A	5.19	8.35	NY 3 in Deferiet	NY 3 in Wilna	early 1950s	
NY 5	370.73	596.63	PA 5 at the Pennsylvania line at Ripley	I-787 / US 9 in Albany	1924	
NY 5A	5.59	9.00	NY 5 in New Hartford	I-790 / NY 5 / NY 5S / NY 8 / NY 12 in Utica	mid-1930s	
NY 5B	3.12	5.02	NY 5 in Kirkland	NY 5 in New Hartford	1930s	
NY 5S	72.77	117.11	I-790 / NY 5 / NY 5A / NY 8 / NY 12 in Utica	NY 890 in Rotterdam	1930	
NY 6N	5.08	8.18	US 6 in Yorktown	US 6 in Carmel	ca. 1938	
NY 7	180.18	289.97	PA 29 at the Pennsylvania line at Conklin	VT 9 at the Vermont line at Hoosick	1927	
NY 7A	1.77	2.85	Pennsylvania line at Conklin	NY 7 in Conklin	1930	
NY 7B	3.74	6.02	NY 369 in Fenton	NY 7 in Colesville	1990s	
NY 8	207.41	333.79	NY 10 / NY 17 in Deposit	NY 9N in Hague	1930	The 2017 route log shows that NY 8 begins at NY 10, 2.16 miles (3.48 km) from its actual southern terminus.
NY 9A	47.51	76.46	Battery Place in New York City	US 9 in Peekskill	1930	
NY 9B	5.97	9.61	US 9 in Chazy	US 11 in Rouses Point	mid-1940s	
NY 9D	25.14	40.46	US 6 / US 202 in Cortlandt	US 9 in Poughkeepsie	1930	
NY 9G	42.79	68.86	US 9 in Poughkeepsie	US 9 / NY 23B in Hudson	1930	
NY 9H	18.78	30.22	US 9 / NY 23 / NY 82 in Livingston	US 9 in Kinderhook	ca. 1932	
NY 9J	22.33	35.94	US 9 in Stockport	US 9 / US 20 in Rensselaer	1930	
NY 9L	18.54	29.84	US 9 / NY 32 in Glens Falls	US 9 / NY 9N in Lake George	1930	
NY 9N	143.13	230.35	US 9 / NY 29 / NY 50 in Saratoga Springs	US 9 / NY 22 in Keeseville	1930	
NY 9P	12.15	19.55	US 9 in Malta	US 9 / NY 50 in Saratoga Springs	ca. 1936	
NY 9R	3.21	5.17	I-87 / US 9 / NY 7 in Colonie	US 9 in Colonie	ca. 1939	
NY 10	155.04	249.51	NY 17 in Deposit	NY 8 in Arietta	1924	
NY 10A	2.44	3.93	NY 29 in Johnstown	NY 10 in Caroga	ca. 1931	
NY 11A	13.08	21.05	NY 80 in Tully	US 11 in Onondaga	1930	
NY 11B	36.99	59.53	US 11 in Potsdam	US 11 / NY 30 / NY 37 in Malone	1930	
NY 11C	11.44	18.41	US 11 in Stockholm	US 11 in Lawrence, St. Lawrence County	1982	
NY 12	221.94	357.18	US 11 in Chenango	NY 37 in Morristown	1924	
NY 12A	1.01	1.63	NY 12 in Chenango	I-88 / NY 7 in Fenton	1930	
NY 12B	35.52	57.16	NY 12 in Sherburne	NY 5 in New Hartford	1930	
NY 12D	11.46	18.44	NY 12 in Boonville	NY 12 in Lyons Falls	1930	
NY 12E	36.08	58.07	NY 12F in Brownsville	NY 12 in Clayton	1930	
NY 12F	6.89	11.09	NY 180 in Hounsfield	US 11 / NY 12 in Watertown	1930	
NY 13	152.44	245.33	I-86 / NY 17 in Horseheads	NY 3 in Richland	1924	
NY 13A	2.07	3.33	NY 13 / NY 34 / NY 96 in Ithaca	NY 79 in Ithaca	ca. 1938	
NY 14	95.16	153.15	PA 14 at the Pennsylvania line at Ashland	Greig Street cul-de-sac at Sodus Point	1924	
NY 14A	36.04	58.00	NY 14 in Reading	US 20 / NY 5 / NY 245 in Geneva	1930	
NY 15	47.29	76.11	I-390 / NY 21 in Wayland	NY 31 in Rochester	1974	
NY 15A	35.15	56.57	NY 15 in Springwater	NY 15 in Rochester	ca. 1939	
NY 16	79.28	127.59	PA 646 at the Pennsylvania line at Allegany	NY 5 in Buffalo	1924	
NY 17	396.77	638.54	Pennsylvania line at Mina; continues as I-86	New Jersey line at Suffern; continues as I-287 / NJ 17	1924	Longest state highway in New York;Concurrent with I-86 from Pennsylvania state line to Woodbury, where that section from Windsor to Woodbury designated as future I-86
NY 17A	24.61	39.61	US 6 / NY 17 / NY 17M / NY 207 in Goshen	NY 17 in Tuxedo	1930	
NY 17B	21.86	35.18	NY 97 in Delaware	NY 17 in Monticello	1930	
NY 17C	40.30	64.86	NY 34 in Waverly, Tioga County	US 11 in Binghamton	1930	
NY 17K	22.45	36.13	CR 76 near Bloomingburg	US 9W / NY 32 in Newburgh	ca. 1939	
NY 17M	26.59	42.79	CR 76 in Wallkill, Orange County	NY 17 in Harriman	1951	
NY 18	87.45	140.74	NY 104 in Lewiston	NY 104 in Rochester	1924	
NY 18F	9.83	15.82	NY 104 / Niagara Scenic Parkway in Lewiston	NY 18 in Porter	1949	
NY 19	108.69	174.92	PA 449 at the Pennsylvania line at Willing	Lake Ontario State Parkway in Hamlin	1930	
NY 19A	18.94	30.48	NY 19 in Hume	NY 19 near Silver Springs	1930	
NY 21	99.84	160.68	NY 417 in Andover	NY 104 in Williamson	1930	
NY 22	336.85	542.11	US 1 in Bronx	US 11 in Mooers	1924	
NY 22A	10.66	17.16	NY 22 in Granville	VT 22A at the Vermont line at Hampton	1945	
NY 22B	9.88	15.90	NY 22 in Peru	NY 3 in Plattsburgh	1930	
NY 23	155.99	251.04	NY 26 in Cincinnatus	MA 23 at the Massachusetts line at Copake	1924	
NY 23A	34.50	55.52	NY 23 in Prattsville	US 9W in Catskill	mid-1920s	
NY 23B	6.70	10.78	NY 9G / NY 23 in Greenport	NY 9H / NY 23 in Claverack	late 1950s	
NY 24	68.03	109.48	I-295 / NY 25 in Queens I-495 in Calverton	NY 110 in East Farmingdale CR 80 in Hampton Bays	1930	
NY 25	105.18	169.27	2nd Avenue in Manhattan	Orient Point ferry landing at Orient Point	mid-1920s	
NY 25A	73.10	117.64	I-495 in Queens	NY 25 in Calverton	ca. 1927	
NY 25B	7.38	11.88	NY 25 in Queens	NY 25 in Westbury	ca. 1935	
NY 26	203.86	328.08	PA 267 at the Pennsylvania line at Vestal	NY 12 in Alexandria Bay	1930	
NY 27	121.21	195.07	I-278 in Brooklyn	Montauk Point State Park in Montauk	mid-1920s	Easternmost state highway in New York, and longest overall highway on Long Island, spanning the entire length of the Island's South Shore.
NY 27A	17.82	28.68	NY 27 in Massapequa	CR 85 in Great River	ca. 1931	
NY 28	281.58	453.16	NY 32 in Kingston	US 9 in Warrensburg	1924	
NY 28A	19.54	31.45	NY 28 in Olive	NY 28 in Kingston	ca. 1933	
NY 28N	50.85	81.84	NY 28 / NY 30 in Indian Lake	NY 28 in Johnsburg	1930	
NY 29	95.10	153.05	NY 28 / NY 169 in Middleville	NY 22 in Salem	mid-1920s	
NY 29A	35.42	57.00	NY 29 in Salisbury, Herkimer County	NY 29 in Broadalbin	1930	
NY 30	300.62	483.80	NY 17 in Hancock	Canadian border at Constable; becomes QC 138	1930	
NY 30A	34.80	56.01	NY 30 in Schoharie	NY 30 in Mayfield	1960	
NY 31	208.71	335.89	NY 104 in Niagara Falls	NY 26 in Vernon	mid-1920s	
NY 31A	22.95	36.93	NY 31 / NY 63 in Medina	NY 31 / NY 19 Truck in Sweden	ca. 1935	
NY 31E	5.29	8.51	NY 31 / NY 271 in Middleport	NY 31 / NY 63 in Medina	1949	
NY 31F	13.65	21.97	NY 96 in Pittsford	NY 31 / NY 350 in Macedon	1949	
NY 32	176.43	283.94	NY 17 in Woodbury, Orange County	NY 196 near Hudson Falls	1930	
NY 32A	1.90	3.06	NY 32 in Saugerties	NY 23A in Catskill	early 1940s	
NY 33	69.24	111.43	NY 5 in Buffalo	NY 31 in Rochester	mid-1920s	
NY 33A	17.13	27.57	NY 33 in Bergen	NY 33 in Rochester	1930	
NY 34	99.40	159.97	Pennsylvania line at Waverly; becomes PA 199	NY 104 in Hannibal	1930	
NY 34B	33.97	54.67	NY 38 in Dryden	NY 34 in Fleming	1930	
NY 35	24.63	39.64	US 6 / US 9 / US 202 in Peekskill	Connecticut line at Lewisboro; becomes CT 35	early 1940s	
NY 36	95.14	153.11	Pennsylvania line at Troupsburg; becomes PA 249	NY 31 in Ogden	mid-1920s	
NY 37	127.24	204.77	US 11 in Watertown	US 11 / NY 11B / NY 30 in Malone	1930	
NY 37B	4.03	6.49	NY 37 in Louisville	NY 37 in Massena	1930	
NY 37C	9.90	15.93	NY 37 in Massena	NY 37 in Bombay	1930	
NY 38	95.60	153.85	NY 96 in Owego	NY 104A in Sterling	1930	
NY 38A	21.85	35.16	NY 38 in Moravia	US 20 / NY 5 in Auburn	1930	
NY 38B	7.70	12.39	NY 38 in Newark Valley	NY 26 in Union	early 1950s	
NY 39	98.81	159.02	US 20 in Sheridan	US 20 / NY 5 in Avon	1930	
NY 40	54.73	88.08	NY 7 in Troy	NY 22 in Granville	1940	
NY 41	95.44	153.60	NY 17 in Sanford	US 20 in Skaneateles	1930	
NY 41A	25.44	40.94	NY 41 in Homer	US 20 in Skaneateles	1930	
NY 42	52.07	83.80	US 6 / US 209 / NY 97 in Port Jervis NY 28 in Shandaken	NY 55 in Neversink NY 23A in Lexington	1930	
NY 43	23.44	37.72	I-90 in North Greenbush	Massachusetts line at Stephentown; becomes MA 43	mid-1920s	
NY 45	8.57	13.79	New Jersey line at Chestnut Ridge; becomes Bergen CR 73	US 202 in Haverstraw	1949	
NY 46	59.37	95.55	NY 12B in Eaton	NY 12D in Boonville	mid-1920s	
NY 48	28.28	45.51	I-690 in Van Buren	NY 104 in Oswego	1930	
NY 49	63.93	102.89	NY 3 in Volney	I-790 / NY 5 / NY 8 / NY 12 in Utica	mid-1920s	
NY 50	31.58	50.82	NY 5 in Scotia	NY 32 in Northumberland	1930	
NY 51	55.12	88.71	NY 8 in Guilford	NY 5 in Herkimer	1930	
NY 52	108.36	174.39	Pennsylvania line at Tusten; becomes PA 652	US 6 in Carmel	1930	
NY 52A	2.77	4.46	NY 17B in Delaware	NY 52 in Delaware	1930	
NY 53	22.46	36.15	NY 415 in Bath	NY 21 in Naples	1930	
NY 54	34.42	55.39	I-86 / NY 17 in Bath	NY 14 in Dresden, Yates County	1930	
NY 54A	22.45	36.13	NY 54 near Hammondsport	NY 14A / NY 54 in Penn Yan	1930	
NY 55	121.65	195.78	NY 97 / PA 434 in Highland	Connecticut line at Dover; becomes CT 55	1930	
NY 55A	9.52	15.32	NY 55 in Neversink	NY 55 in Wawarsing	mid-1940s	
NY 56	51.36	82.66	NY 3 in Colton	NY 37 near Massena	1930	
NY 58	45.99	74.01	NY 37 in Morristown	NY 3 in Fine	1930	
NY 59	13.86	22.31	NY 17 in Hillburn	US 9W in Nyack	late 1920s	
NY 60	33.20	53.43	US 62 in Kiantone	NY 5 in Dunkirk	1920s	
NY 61	3.88	6.24	NY 384 in Niagara Falls	NY 104 in Lewiston	ca. 1962	
NY 63	82.09	132.11	NY 15 / NY 21 in Wayland	NY 18 in Yates	1930	
NY 64	31.08	50.02	NY 21 in South Bristol	NY 96 / NY 252 in Pittsford	1930	
NY 65	18.52	29.81	US 20 / NY 5 in West Bloomfield	NY 96 in Brighton, Monroe County	1930	
NY 66	46.31	74.53	NY 23B in Hudson	NY 2 in Troy	mid-1920s	
NY 67	86.33	138.93	NY 5 in St. Johnsville	Vermont line at Hoosick; becomes VT 67	1930	
NY 68	33.47	53.86	NY 37 in Ogdensburg	NY 56 in Colton	mid-1920s	
NY 69	57.25	92.13	NY 104 in Mexico	NY 5A in Yorkville, Oneida County	1930	
NY 69A	2.05	3.30	US 11 in Hastings	NY 69 in Parish	ca. 1931	
NY 70	17.98	28.94	NY 436 in Portage	NY 36 near Canaseraga	1930	
NY 71	2.33	3.75	Massachusetts line at Hillsdale; becomes MA 71	NY 22 in Hillsdale	1930	
NY 72	15.32	24.66	NY 56 near Potsdam	NY 11B in Hopkinton	1930	
NY 73	27.56	44.35	US 9 in Underwood	NY 86 in Lake Placid	1930	
NY 74	20.45	32.91	I-87 in Schroon	Ticonderoga – Larrabees Point ferry at Ticonderoga	ca. 1973	
NY 75	21.36	34.38	NY 39 in Collins	NY 5 in Hamburg	ca. 1932	
NY 76	19.43	31.27	NY 474 in Clymer	NY 5 in Ripley	1930	
NY 77	46.31	74.53	NY 78 / NY 98 in Java	NY 31 in Lockport	1930	
NY 78	73.57	118.40	NY 19 near Gainesville	NY 18 in Olcott	1930	
NY 79	93.08	149.80	Pennsylvania line at Windsor; becomes PA 92	NY 414 in Hector	1930	
NY 80	126.89	204.21	NY 175 in Syracuse	NY 5 in Nelliston	late 1920s	The 2017 route log shows that NY 80 begins at NY 173, 1.21 miles (1.95 km) from its actual western terminus.
NY 81	22.40	36.05	NY 145 in Rensselaerville	US 9W / NY 385 in Coxsackie	1930	
NY 82	59.96	96.50	NY 52 near Fishkill	US 9 / NY 9H / NY 23 in Livingston	1930	
NY 83	21.80	35.08	US 62 in Ellington	NY 60 in Pomfret	1930	
NY 85	26.68	42.94	CR 353 in Rensselaerville	I-90 in Albany	1930	
NY 85A	5.57	8.96	NY 85 in New Scotland	NY 85 in New Scotland	ca. 1932	
NY 86	39.12	62.96	NY 30 in Brighton, Franklin County	NY 9N in Jay	1930	
NY 88	20.66	33.25	NY 96 in Phelps	NY 104 in Sodus	1930	
NY 89	62.17	100.05	NY 13 / NY 34 / NY 96 in Ithaca	NY 104 near Wolcott	1930	
NY 90	52.93	85.18	US 11 / NY 41 in Homer	NY 31 in Montezuma	1930	
NY 91	23.73	38.19	NY 13 in Truxton	NY 173 in Jamesville	1930	
NY 92	17.30	27.84	US 11 in Syracuse	US 20 in Cazenovia	1930	
NY 93	43.17	69.48	NY 18F in Youngstown	NY 5 in Akron	1930	
NY 94	32.50	52.30	New Jersey line at Warwick; becomes NJ 94	US 9W in New Windsor	1949	
NY 95	13.38	21.53	US 11 in Moira	NY 37 in Bombay	1930	
NY 96	126.21	203.12	I-86 / NY 17 in Owego	East Main Street in Rochester	early 1940s	The 2017 route log shows that NY 96 ends at North and South Union Streets, 0.41 miles (0.66 km) from its actual northern terminus.
NY 96A	27.00	43.45	NY 96 in Interlaken	US 20 / NY 5 in Waterloo	early 1940s	
NY 96B	19.56	31.48	NY 96 in Candor	NY 13 / NY 34 / NY 96 in Ithaca	early 1950s	
NY 97	70.49	113.44	US 6 / US 209 / NY 42 in Port Jervis	NY 17 in Hancock	1930	
NY 98	97.88	157.52	US 219 in Great Valley	Lake Ontario State Parkway in Carlton	1930	
NY 100	33.32	53.62	Cross County Parkway in Yonkers	US 202 in Somers	1930	
NY 100A	4.18	6.73	NY 100 in Greenburgh	NY 100 / NY 100C on Greenburgh – Mount Pleasant town line	1930	
NY 100B	2.86	4.60	NY 9A in Greenburgh	NY 119 in Greenburgh	late 1930s	
NY 100C	1.25	2.01	NY 9A in Greenburgh	NY 100 / NY 100A on Greenburgh – Mount Pleasant town line	late 1930s	
NY 101	3.58	5.76	NY 25A in Flower Hill	Astor Lane in Sands Point	ca. 1931	
NY 102	4.61	7.42	NY 24 in Hempstead	NY 24 in East Meadow	ca. 1932	The 2017 route log shows that NY 102 begins at William Street, 1.33 miles (2.14 km) from its actual western terminus.
NY 103	0.50	0.80	NY 5S in Rotterdam	NY 5 in Glenville	early 1930s	
NY 104	182.27	293.34	NY 384 in Niagara Falls	NY 13 in Williamstown	June 1971	
NY 104A	17.36	27.94	NY 104 / NY 370 near Red Creek	NY 104 in Oswego	1935	
NY 104B	6.08	9.78	NY 104 in New Haven	NY 3 in Mexico	1935	
NY 105	3.47	5.58	NY 106 in North Bellmore	NY 107 in Massapequa	ca. 1932	
NY 106	13.30	21.40	NY 105 in North Bellmore	Bay Avenue in Oyster Bay	1930	
NY 107	16.96	27.29	Merrick Road in Massapequa	Mill Street in Glen Cove	1930	
NY 108	1.64	2.64	Nassau County line in Cold Spring Harbor	NY 25A in Cold Spring Harbor	ca. 1932	
NY 109	7.18	11.56	NY 24 in Farmingdale	NY 27A in Babylon	early 1930s	
NY 110	15.85	25.51	NY 27A in Amityville	Youngs Hill Road in Halesite	1930	
NY 111	9.46	15.22	NY 27A in Islip	NY 25 / NY 25A in Village of the Branch	1930	
NY 112	12.54	20.18	East Main Street in Patchogue	NY 25A in Port Jefferson Station	1930	
NY 113	3.12	5.02	US 9 in Poughkeepsie	NY 376 in Red Oaks Mill	1980	
NY 114	15.63	25.15	NY 27 in East Hampton	NY 25 in Greenport	1930	
NY 115	12.45	20.04	US 44 / NY 55 in Poughkeepsie	Taconic State Parkway in Clinton	1980	
NY 116	8.06	12.97	US 202 in Somers	Connecticut line at North Salem; becomes CT 116	1930	
NY 117	15.20	24.46	US 9 in Mount Pleasant	Saw Mill River Parkway in Bedford	1930	
NY 118	10.72	17.25	NY 100 in Yorktown	US 6 in Carmel	1930	
NY 119	6.04	9.72	US 9 in Tarrytown	NY 22 in White Plains	1930	
NY 120	18.07	29.08	US 1 in Rye	NY 100 in New Castle	1930	
NY 120A	8.63	13.89	I-287 / NY 120 in Harrison	NY 120 in North Castle	ca. 1931	
NY 121	15.48	24.91	NY 22 in Bedford	US 6 / US 202 in Southeast	1930	
NY 122	10.25	16.50	NY 37 in Westville	US 11 in Burke	ca. 1938	
NY 123	4.67	7.52	Connecticut line at Lewisboro; becomes CT 123	NY 35 in Lewisboro	1930	
NY 124	4.95	7.97	NY 137 in Pound Ridge	NY 35 in Lewisboro	1930	
NY 125	7.53	12.12	US 1 in Mamaroneck	NY 22 in White Plains	1930	
NY 126	28.63	46.08	NY 12 in Watertown	NY 812 in Croghan	late 1970s	
NY 127	6.37	10.25	US 1 in Mamaroneck	I-287 in White Plains	1930	
NY 128	5.52	8.88	NY 22 in Armonk	NY 117 in Mount Kisco	1930	
NY 129	7.73	12.44	NY 9A in Croton-on-Hudson	NY 118 in Yorktown	1930	
NY 130	6.08	9.78	US 62 in Buffalo	US 20 / NY 78 in Depew	ca. 1938	
NY 131	12.48	20.08	NY 37 in Louisville	NY 37 in Massena	late 1950s	
NY 132	2.78	4.47	US 202 / NY 35 in Yorktown	US 6 in Yorktown	1930	
NY 133	8.66	13.94	US 9 in Ossining	NY 117 in Mount Kisco	1930	
NY 134	6.41	10.32	NY 133 in Ossining	NY 100 in Yorktown	1930	
NY 135	10.78	17.35	Merrick Road in Seaford	NY 25 in Syosset	by 1964	
NY 136	2.62	4.22	US 4 in North Greenbush	NY 150 in North Greenbush	ca. 1938	
NY 137	5.51	8.87	Connecticut line at Pound Ridge; becomes CT 137	NY 121 in Bedford	1930	
NY 138	5.23	8.42	NY 100 in Somers	NY 121 in Lewisboro	1930	
NY 139	2.75	4.43	NY 100 in Somers	US 202 in Somers	ca. 1931	
NY 140	2.07	3.33	NY 443 in Bethlehem	NY 85 in Bethlehem	mid-1930s	
NY 141	3.48	5.60	NY 9A in Mount Pleasant	NY 117 in Pleasantville	1930	
NY 142	3.87	6.23	NY 7 in Brunswick	US 4 in Troy	ca. 1938	
NY 143	18.78	30.22	NY 85 in Westerlo	NY 144 in Coeymans	1930	
NY 144	14.70	23.66	US 9W in New Baltimore	NY 32 near Albany	1930	
NY 145	46.98	75.61	NY 23 in Cairo	US 20 in Sharon	1930	
NY 146	42.86	68.98	NY 443 in Wright	US 4 / NY 32 in Halfmoon	1930	
NY 146A	6.35	10.22	NY 146 in Clifton Park	NY 50 in Ballston	ca. 1932	
NY 147	17.10	27.52	NY 5 in Scotia	NY 29 in Galway	1930	
NY 148	7.54	12.13	NY 104 in Hartland	NY 18 in Somerset	1960	
NY 149	32.32	52.01	I-87 in Queensbury	Vermont line at Granville; becomes VT 149	1930	
NY 150	17.51	28.18	NY 9J in Castleton-on-Hudson	NY 66 in North Greenbush	1930	
NY 151	8.22	13.23	US 9 / US 20 in Rensselaer	NY 150 in Schodack	1930	
NY 153	3.03	4.88	NY 96 in Pittsford	NY 441 in Penfield	1980s	
NY 155	16.90	27.20	NY 85A in Voorheesville	NY 32 in Watervliet	ca. 1931	
NY 156	16.31	26.25	NY 443 in Berne	NY 85A in Voorheesville	1930	
NY 157	9.23	14.85	NY 156 in Berne	NY 85 in New Scotland	1930	
NY 157A	5.89	9.48	NY 157 in Berne	NY 157 in Berne	early 1930s	
NY 158	5.74	9.24	NY 146 in Altamont	NY 7 in Rotterdam	1930	
NY 159	13.47	21.68	NY 30 in Duanesburg	NY 7 in Rotterdam	1930	
NY 160	6.59	10.61	NY 159 in Duanesburg	NY 5S in Rotterdam	1930	
NY 161	7.06	11.36	NY 30A in Glen	NY 30 in Florida	1930	
NY 162	14.17	22.80	US 20 / NY 30A in Esperance	NY 5S in Root	1930	
NY 163	11.91	19.17	NY 5S / NY 80 in Fort Plain	NY 10 in Canajoharie	1930	
NY 164	2.86	4.60	NY 311 in Patterson	NY 22 in Patterson	1970	
NY 165	12.14	19.54	NY 166 in Roseboom	NY 10 in Seward	1930	
NY 166	21.05	33.88	NY 28 in Milford	US 20 near Cherry Valley village	1930	
NY 167	26.03	41.89	US 20 in Richfield Springs	NY 29 in Dolgeville	1930	
NY 168	14.05	22.61	NY 28 in Mohawk	NY 80 in Stark	1930	
NY 169	12.42	19.99	NY 5S in Danube	NY 28 / NY 29 in Middleville	1930	
NY 170	7.30	11.75	NY 169 in Little Falls	NY 29 in Fairfield	1930	
NY 170A	2.95	4.75	NY 170 in Fairfield	NY 29 in Fairfield	by 1931	
NY 171	5.69	9.16	Ball Road / Gulph Road in Frankfort town	Main Street in Frankfort village	1930	
NY 172	8.80	14.16	NY 117 in Mount Kisco	NY 137 in Pound Ridge	1930	
NY 173	30.54	49.15	NY 31 in Van Buren	NY 5 in Chittenango	1930	
NY 174	16.92	27.23	NY 41 in Spafford	NY 5 in Camillus	1930	
NY 175	15.53	24.99	US 20 in Skaneateles	US 11 in Syracuse	1930	
NY 176	13.77	22.16	NY 370 in Cato	NY 48 in Fulton	1930	
NY 177	25.65	41.28	I-81 in Adams	NY 12 near Lowville village	1930	
NY 178	10.20	16.42	NY 3 in Henderson	US 11 in Adams	1930	
NY 179	4.36	7.02	NY 5 in Hamburg	US 20 in Orchard Park	mid-1960s	
NY 180	24.52	39.46	NY 3 in Hounsfield	NY 12 in Orleans	1930	
NY 182	6.22	10.01	Whirlpool Rapids Bridge in Niagara Falls	US 62 on Niagara-Wheatfield town line	ca. 1962	
NY 183	4.73	7.61	NY 69 in Amboy	NY 13 in Williamstown	1930	
NY 184	13.67	22.00	NY 58 in Macomb	NY 812 in Heuvelton	ca. 1931	
NY 185	4.12	6.63	NY 9N / NY 22 in Crown Point	Vermont line at Crown Point; becomes VT 17	2008	
NY 186	3.89	6.26	NY 30 in Harrietstown	NY 86 in Harrietstown	1989	
NY 187	3.05	4.91	US 20A in Orchard Park	US 20 in Elma	early 1940s	
NY 189	5.70	9.17	US 11 in Clinton	Canadian border at Clinton; becomes QC 209	1930	
NY 190	33.50	53.91	NY 374 in Bellmont	NY 3 in Plattsburgh	1930	
NY 193	8.49	13.66	NY 3 in Ellisburg	US 11 near Mannsville	ca. 1931	
NY 196	10.33	16.62	US 4 in Hudson Falls	NY 40 in Hartford	1930	
NY 197	10.78	17.35	US 9 in Moreau	NY 40 in Argyle	1930	
NY 198	3.63	5.84	I-190 in Buffalo	NY 33 in Buffalo	1962	
NY 199	30.83	49.62	US 9W / US 209 in Ulster	US 44 / NY 22 in North East	1930	
NY 200	1.38	2.22	NY 38 in Harford	NY 221 in Harford	1940s	
NY 201	2.04	3.28	NY 434 in Vestal	NY 17 in Johnson City	1970s	
NY 203	22.91	36.87	NY 22 in Austerlitz	US 20 in Nassau	1930	
NY 204	3.35	5.39	I-490 in Gates	Rochester city line in Gates	ca. 1965	
NY 205	23.32	37.53	I-88 in Oneonta	NY 28 / NY 80 in Otsego	1930	
NY 206	74.94	120.60	NY 26 / NY 79 in Whitney Point	NY 17 in Rockland	1930	
NY 207	19.07	30.69	US 6 / NY 17 / NY 17A / NY 17M in Goshen	NY 17K in Newburgh	1930	
NY 208	34.78	55.97	NY 17M in Monroe	NY 32 / NY 299 in New Paltz	1930	
NY 210	4.03	6.49	New Jersey line at Warwick; becomes Passaic CR 511	NY 17A in Greenwood Lake	1930	
NY 211	22.80	36.69	US 209 in Deerpark	NY 17K in Montgomery	1930	
NY 212	21.77	35.04	NY 28 in Shandaken	US 9W / NY 32 in Saugerties	1930	
NY 213	27.08	43.58	NY 28A in Olive	NY 32 in Kingston	1930	
NY 214	12.34	19.86	NY 28 in Shandaken	NY 23A near Tannersville	1930	
NY 215	6.10	9.82	NY 392 in Virgil	NY 13 in Cortland	early 1980s	
NY 216	6.19	9.96	NY 52 in East Fishkill	NY 55 in Beekman	1930	
NY 217	6.71	10.80	NY 23 in Claverack	Columbia CR 21C at Harder Road in Ghent	1930	
NY 218	10.51	16.91	US 9W in Highland Falls	US 9W near Cornwall-on-Hudson	August 1941	
NY 220	20.79	33.46	NY 41 in Smithville	Chenango CR 32 in Oxford	1930	The 2017 route log shows that NY 220 ends at NY 12, 1.57 miles (2.53 km) from its actual eastern terminus.
NY 221	18.71	30.11	NY 38 in Harford	NY 26 / NY 41 in Willet	1930	
NY 222	10.57	17.01	NY 38 in Groton	US 11 / NY 13 / NY 41 in Cortland	1930	
NY 223	12.53	20.17	NY 13 in Horseheads	NY 224 in Van Etten	1930	
NY 224	19.74	31.77	NY 34 in Van Etten	NY 14 in Montour Falls	1930	
NY 225	15.57	25.06	NY 352 in Big Flats	NY 352 in Corning	1949	
NY 226	19.03	30.63	I-86 / NY 17 near Savona	NY 14A in Reading	1930	
NY 227	9.86	15.87	NY 79 in Hector	NY 96 in Trumansburg	1930	
NY 228	12.47	20.07	NY 224 in Odessa	NY 227 in Hector	1930	
NY 230	8.95	14.40	NY 54 in Wayne	NY 14A in Dundee	1930	
NY 231	9.06	14.58	NY 27A in Babylon	Northern State Parkway in Dix Hills	1960s	
NY 232	2.40	3.86	I-81 in Watertown	US 11 in Watertown	ca. 1962	
NY 233	12.06	19.41	NY 12B near Clinton	NY 49 / NY 69 / NY 365 in Rome	1930	
NY 235	9.17	14.76	NY 7 in Colesville	NY 41 / NY 206 in Coventry	1930	
NY 236	2.47	3.98	US 9 in Halfmoon	NY 146 in Halfmoon	1949	
NY 237	28.47	45.82	NY 5 in Stafford	Lake Ontario State Parkway in Kendall	1930	
NY 238	15.18	24.43	US 20A in Orangeville	US 20 in Darien	1930	
NY 240	51.64	83.11	NY 242 in Ashford	I-290 / NY 324 in Amherst	1930	
NY 241	6.97	11.22	NY 394 in Randolph	US 62 in Conewango	1930	
NY 242	31.95	51.42	NY 394 in Coldspring	NY 16 in Machias	1930	
NY 243	11.01	17.72	NY 98 in Farmersville	NY 19 in Caneadea	1930	
NY 244	15.71	25.28	NY 19 in Belmont	NY 21 in Alfred	1930	
NY 245	28.53	45.91	NY 21 in Naples	US 20 / NY 5 / NY 14A in Geneva	1930	
NY 246	10.47	16.85	NY 39 in Perry	NY 63 in Pavilion	1930	
NY 247	11.14	17.93	NY 364 in Potter	US 20 / NY 5 in Hopewell	1930	
NY 248	31.42	50.57	NY 19 in Willing	NY 36 in Canisteo	1930	
NY 248A	5.16	8.30	Pennsylvania line at Willing; becomes PA 244	NY 248 in Independence	1950	
NY 249	13.51	21.74	NY 5 in Farnham	NY 75 in Langford	1930	
NY 250	16.02	25.78	NY 96 in Perinton	Lake Road in Webster	1930	
NY 251	17.81	28.66	NY 383 in Scottsville	NY 96 in Victor	1930	
NY 252	12.93	20.81	NY 33A in Chili	NY 64 / NY 96 in Pittsford	early 1930s	
NY 253	10.80	17.38	NY 383 in Scottsville	NY 65 in Pittsford	1930	
NY 254	6.08	9.78	I-87 in Queensbury	US 4 in Hudson Falls	ca. 1965	
NY 256	21.03	33.84	NY 63 in Dansville	NY 15 on Geneseo–Livonia town line	1930	
NY 257	3.79	6.10	NY 92 in Manlius village	NY 290 in Manlius town	1940s	
NY 258	1.88	3.03	NY 36 on Groveland – West Sparta town line	NY 63 in Groveland	ca. 1931	
NY 259	17.09	27.50	NY 33A in Chili	Lake Ontario State Parkway in Parma	1930	
NY 260	10.55	16.98	NY 31 in Sweden	Lake Ontario State Parkway in Hamlin	1930	
NY 261	7.84	12.62	NY 104 on Greece–Parma town line	Lake Ontario State Parkway in Greece	ca. 1931	
NY 262	17.05	27.44	NY 63 in Oakfield	NY 19 in Bergen	1930	
NY 263	10.48	16.87	US 62 in Amherst	NY 78 on Amherst–Clarence town line	ca. 1931	
NY 264	8.60	13.84	Oswego CR 57 in Phoenix	NY 3 in Palermo	ca. 1932	
NY 265	19.78	31.83	I-190 / Thruway / NY 198 / NY 266 in Buffalo	NY 104 in Lewiston	ca. 1936	
NY 266	11.15	17.94	I-190 / Thruway in Buffalo	NY 265 in Tonawanda	ca. 1935	
NY 268	10.66	17.16	NY 97 in Hancock	NY 10 in Tompkins	early 1990s	
NY 269	6.36	10.24	NY 104 on Hartland–Ridgeway town line	NY 18 on Somerset–Yates town line	1930	
NY 270	9.54	15.35	NY 263 in Amherst	NY 31 / NY 93 in Lockport	1930	
NY 271	3.23	5.20	NY 31 / NY 31E in Middleport	NY 104 in Ridgeway	1930	
NY 272	7.58	12.20	NY 104 on Murray–Clarkson town line	Lake Ontario shoreline on Kendall–Hamlin town line	1930	
NY 274	10.44	16.80	NY 365 in Holland Patent	NY 46 in Western	early 1950s	
NY 275	11.46	18.44	NY 417 in Bolivar	I-86 / NY 17 in Friendship	1930	
NY 276	4.70	7.56	US 11 in Champlain	US 11 in Rouses Point	ca. 1963	
NY 277	21.42	34.47	NY 391 in Boston	NY 324 in Amherst	1930	
NY 278	1.51	2.43	NY 7 in Brunswick	NY 2 in Brunswick	ca. 1938	
NY 279	8.74	14.07	NY 98 in Gaines	NY 18 in Carlton	1935	
NY 280	11.68	18.80	I-86 / NY 17 in Coldspring	Pennsylvania line at South Valley; becomes PA 346	1930	
NY 281	16.55	26.63	NY 13 in Cortlandville	US 11 / NY 80 in Tully	ca. 1931	
NY 282	3.49	5.62	Pennsylvania line at Nichols; becomes PA 187	NY 17C in Smithboro	1930	
NY 283	5.81	9.35	US 11 / NY 12 in Watertown	NY 342 in Calcium	1980s	
NY 284	8.97	14.44	New Jersey line at Minisink; becomes NJ 284	US 6 in Wawayanda	mid-1960s	
NY 286	13.06	21.02	NY 590 in Rochester	NY 350 in Walworth	1949	
NY 289	5.96	9.59	NY 193 in Ellisburg	NY 178 in Adams	1930	
NY 290	12.36	19.89	US 11 in Syracuse	NY 5 in Manlius	1930	
NY 291	7.49	12.05	NY 69 in Whitestown	NY 365 in Marcy	1970	
NY 292	7.60	12.23	NY 311 in Patterson	NY 55 in Pawling	1970	
NY 293	6.83	10.99	US 6 in Woodbury	US 9W / NY 218 in Highlands	ca. 1934	
NY 294	6.81	10.96	NY 26 in Lewis	NY 46 in Boonville	1930	
NY 295	12.87	20.71	NY 66 in Chatham	Massachusetts line at Canaan; becomes MA 295	ca. 1931	
NY 296	7.85	12.63	NY 23A in Hunter	NY 23 in Windham	1930	
NY 297	2.33	3.75	NY 173 in Camillus	I-690 in Geddes	late 1950s	
NY 298	14.12	22.72	I-690 in Syracuse	NY 31 in Cicero	ca. 1934	
NY 299	12.55	20.20	US 44 / NY 55 in Gardiner	US 9W in Highland	1930	
NY 300	14.59	23.48	NY 208 in Shawangunk	NY 32 / NY 94 in New Windsor	1930	
NY 301	18.80	30.26	NY 9D in Cold Spring	NY 52 in Carmel	1930	
NY 302	10.39	16.72	NY 17M near Middletown	NY 52 in Crawford	1930	
NY 303	10.92	17.57	New Jersey line at Orangetown; becomes Bergen CR 505	US 9W in Clarkstown	1930	
NY 304	10.37	16.69	New Jersey line at Orangetown; becomes Bergen CR 503	US 9W in Haverstraw	1930	
NY 305	31.30	50.37	Pennsylvania line at Portville; becomes PA 446	NY 19 in Belfast	early 1940s	
NY 306	5.30	8.53	NY 59 in Ramapo	US 202 in Pomona	1930	
NY 308	6.18	9.95	US 9 in Rhinebeck	NY 199 in Milan	1930	
NY 309	6.56	10.56	NY 29A in Gloversville	Fulton CR 112 in Bleecker	1930	
NY 310	21.44	34.50	US 11 / NY 68 in Canton	NY 56 in Norfolk	1982	
NY 311	6.12	9.85	NY 52 in Kent	NY 22 in Patterson	1930	
NY 312	4.36	7.02	US 6 in Southeast	NY 22 in Southeast	ca. 1937	
NY 313	8.95	14.40	NY 22 in Cambridge	Vermont line at Salem; becomes VT 313	1930	
NY 314	0.76	1.22	I-87 in Plattsburgh	US 9 in Plattsburgh	ca. 1962	Formerly connected with the Plattsburgh-Grand Isle Ferry
NY 315	5.27	8.48	NY 12 in Waterville	NY 12B in Marshall	1930	
NY 316	4.04	6.50	NY 46 in Oneida	NY 31 in Lenox	1930	
NY 317	3.07	4.94	NY 5 in Elbridge	NY 31 in Jordan	2003	
NY 318	10.93	17.59	I-90 / Thruway / NY 14 in Phelps	US 20 / NY 5 on Tyre – Seneca Falls town line	ca. 1963	
NY 320	3.51	5.65	NY 12 in Norwich	Chenango CR 29 in North Norwich	1930	
NY 321	8.43	13.57	US 20 in Skaneateles	NY 5 in Camillus	1930	
NY 322	4.71	7.58	NY 83 in Villenova	US 62 in Dayton	1930	
NY 324	22.60	36.37	I-190 / Thruway / NY 384 in Niagara Falls	NY 5 in Clarence	ca. 1933	
NY 325	1.44	2.32	I-190 / Thruway / NY 266 in Tonawanda	NY 324 in Tonawanda	ca. 1935	
NY 326	8.74	14.07	NY 90 in Union Springs	US 20 / NY 5 near Auburn	1930	
NY 327	7.10	11.43	NY 13 / NY 34 / NY 96 in Ithaca	NY 79 in Enfield	1930	
NY 328	6.19	9.96	Pennsylvania line at Southport; becomes PA 328	NY 14 in Southport	1930	
NY 329	2.60	4.18	NY 14 / NY 414 in Watkins Glen	Meads Hill Road in Dix	1930	
NY 331	3.10	4.99	Montgomery CR 57 in St. Johnsville	NY 29 in Oppenheim	1930	
NY 332	9.12	14.68	US 20 / NY 5 / NY 21 in Canandaigua	I-90 / Thruway in Farmington	1930	
NY 334	5.92	9.53	NY 5 in Fonda	NY 67 in Johnstown	1930	
NY 335	1.77	2.85	Feura Bush Road in Bethlehem	NY 443 in Bethlehem	1930s	
NY 336	4.64	7.47	NY 96A in Fayette	NY 414 in Fayette	ca. 1931	
NY 337	2.59	4.17	NY 7 in Rotterdam	I-890 in Rotterdam	1980	
NY 340	3.17	5.10	New Jersey line at Orangetown; becomes Bergen CR 501	Greenbush Road in Orangetown	ca. 1932	
NY 342	8.38	13.49	NY 3 in Le Ray	NY 12 in Pamelia	ca. 1963	
NY 343	18.47	29.72	NY 82 in Millbrook	Connecticut line at Amenia; becomes CT 343	1930	
NY 344	1.90	3.06	NY 22 in Copake	Massachusetts line at Copake	ca. 1932	
NY 345	17.87	28.76	NY 37 in Waddington	US 11 in Potsdam	1930	
NY 346	2.61	4.20	NY 22 in Petersburgh	Vermont line at Petersburgh; becomes VT 346	1930	
NY 347	14.78	23.79	NY 454 / Northern State Parkway in Hauppauge	NY 25A in Mount Sinai	1966	
NY 349	3.57	5.75	NY 30A in Johnstown	NY 30 in Mayfield	ca. 1931	
NY 350	11.46	18.44	NY 31 / NY 31F in Macedon	NY 104 in Ontario	ca. 1932	
NY 351	8.15	13.12	NY 43 in Sand Lake	NY 2 in Brunswick	1980	
NY 352	18.96	30.51	NY 415 in Riverside	NY 17 in Elmira	mid-1960s	
NY 353	23.95	38.54	NY 417 in Salamanca	US 62 in Dayton	ca. 1933	
NY 354	31.78	51.14	NY 5 in Buffalo	NY 98 in Attica	1930	
NY 355	2.94	4.73	NY 66 in North Greenbush	NY 351 in Poestenkill	by 1946	
NY 357	13.94	22.43	NY 7 in Unadilla	NY 28 in Franklin	1970	
NY 359	1.71	2.75	NY 38A in Skaneateles	NY 41A in Skaneateles	early 1940s	
NY 362	3.70	5.95	NY 39 in Eagle	NY 78 in Wethersfield	1930	
NY 363	1.41	2.27	NY 434 in Binghamton	NY 7 in Binghamton	1974	
NY 364	24.64	39.65	NY 14A in Penn Yan	US 20 / NY 5 in Canandaigua	1930	
NY 365	44.23	71.18	NY 5 in Oneida	NY 8 in Ohio	1932	
NY 365A	3.47	5.58	NY 5 in Oneida	NY 365 in Verona	1949	
NY 366	9.38	15.10	NY 79 in Ithaca	NY 38 in Freeville	1930	
NY 367	1.04	1.67	Pennsylvania line at Wellsburg	NY 427 in Wellsburg	1930	
NY 369	6.29	10.12	NY 7B in Fenton	NY 79 in Fenton	1930	
NY 370	35.11	56.50	NY 104 / NY 104A near Red Creek	US 11 in Syracuse	1930	
NY 371	4.85	7.81	NY 415 in Cohocton village	NY 21 in Cohocton town	1930	
NY 372	8.89	14.31	NY 29 in Greenwich	NY 22 in Cambridge	1930	
NY 373	3.19	5.13	US 9 in Chesterfield	Port Kent – Burlington Ferry in Chesterfield	1930	
NY 374	42.68	68.69	US 11 in Chateaugay	NY 22 in Plattsburgh	1930	
NY 375	2.89	4.65	NY 28 in Hurley	NY 212 in Woodstock	1930	
NY 376	13.87	22.32	NY 52 in East Fishkill	US 44 / NY 55 in Poughkeepsie	1935	
NY 377	1.75	2.82	US 9 in Albany	NY 378 in Menands	mid-1930s	
NY 378	3.30	5.31	US 9 in Colonie	US 4 in Troy	mid-1930s	
NY 383	18.71	30.11	NY 36 in Wheatland	NY 31 in Rochester	early 1940s	
NY 384	21.84	35.15	NY 5 in Buffalo	NY 104 in Niagara Falls	1930	
NY 385	13.76	22.14	US 9W in Catskill	US 9W / NY 81 in Coxsackie	ca. 1932	
NY 386	15.47	24.90	NY 383 in Scottsville	NY 104 in Greece	ca. 1931	
NY 387	2.95	4.75	NY 31 in Murray	NY 104 in Murray	1930	
NY 390	8.00	12.87	I-390 / I-490 in Gates	Lake Ontario State Parkway in Greece	1980	Extension of Interstate 390
NY 391	3.62	5.83	NY 277 in Boston	US 62 in Hamburg	June 1971	
NY 392	13.11	21.10	NY 13 / NY 38 in Dryden	US 11 in Virgil	early 1980s	
NY 394	52.47	84.44	NY 5 in Westfield	I-86 / NY 17 in Coldspring	1973	
NY 395	2.37	3.81	NY 7 in Duanesburg	US 20 in Duanesburg	1930	
NY 396	6.64	10.69	Albany CR 301 in Coeymans	NY 144 in Bethlehem	1930	
NY 397	3.09	4.97	NY 146 in Altamont	US 20 in Guilderland	1930	
NY 400	16.95	27.28	NY 16 in Aurora	I-90 / Thruway in West Seneca	1970	
NY 403	2.28	3.67	US 9 in Philipstown	NY 9D in Philipstown	mid-1930s	
NY 404	10.05	16.17	NY 590 in Irondequoit	NY 104 in Webster	ca. 1971	
NY 406	3.60	5.79	US 20 in Princetown	NY 158 in Rotterdam	mid-1930s	
NY 408	15.93	25.64	NY 70 in Nunda	NY 63 in Groveland	early 1940s	
NY 409	1.69	2.72	NY 14 / NY 414 in Watkins Glen	Norfolk Southern grade crossing in Dix	by 1970	
NY 410	3.97	6.39	NY 26 in Denmark	NY 126 in Croghan	1930	
NY 411	7.54	12.13	NY 180 in Orleans	NY 26 / NY 37 in Theresa	1930	
NY 412	0.73	1.17	NY 233 in Kirkland	NY 12B in Clinton	mid-1930s	
NY 414	83.41	134.24	NY 352 in Corning	NY 104 in Huron	ca. 1935	
NY 415	42.86	68.98	NY 414 in Corning	NY 15 / NY 21 in Wayland	mid-1960s	
NY 416	4.22	6.79	NY 207 in Hamptonburgh	NY 211 in Montgomery	1930	
NY 417	105.10	169.14	I-86 / NY 17 in Salamanca	NY 415 in Painted Post	1970	
NY 418	3.51	5.65	Warren CR 4 in Thurman	US 9 in Warrensburg	1930	
NY 419	0.39	0.63	NY 329 in Watkins Glen	Watkins Glen State Park south entrance	by 1970	
NY 420	11.90	19.15	US 11 in Stockholm	NY 37 in Massena	1930	
NY 421	5.70	9.17	NY 30 in Piercefield	Veteran's Mountain Camp in Piercefield	ca. 1931	
NY 423	3.86	6.21	NY 9P in Stillwater	NY 32 in Stillwater	ca. 1931	
NY 425	24.02	38.66	I-290 in Tonawanda	NY 18 in Wilson	1930	
NY 426	13.32	21.44	Pennsylvania line at French Creek; becomes PA 426	Pennsylvania line at Mina; becomes PA 426	1930	
NY 427	11.69	18.81	NY 14 in Southport	NY 17 in Chemung	early 1940s	
NY 429	12.17	19.59	NY 265 / NY 384 in North Tonawanda	NY 104 on Lewiston–Cambria town line	ca. 1932	
NY 430	39.24	63.15	Pennsylvania line at Mina; becomes PA 430	NY 60 / NY 394 in Jamestown	ca. 1932	
NY 431	8.01	12.89	Whiteface Mountain in Wilmington	NY 86 in Wilmington	1935	
NY 433	0.70	1.13	Connecticut line at North Castle	NY 22 in North Castle	early 1970s	
NY 434	20.88	33.60	NY 96 in Owego	US 11 in Binghamton	1970	
NY 436	23.73	38.19	NY 39 in Lamont	NY 36 in Dansville	ca. 1972	
NY 437	0.33	0.53	NY 38 in Owasco	NY 38A in Fleming	1970	Was on maps since the early 1940s
NY 438	11.79	18.97	US 62 / NY 39 in Gowanda	US 20 / NY 5 in Brant	early 1940s	
NY 440	12.77	20.55	New Jersey line at Staten Island; becomes NJ 440	New Jersey line at Staten Island; becomes NJ 440	1949	
NY 441	12.57	20.23	NY 96 in Brighton	NY 350 in Walworth	1949	
NY 442	3.94	6.34	NY 22 in Peru	US 9 in Peru	1970	
NY 443	33.28	53.56	NY 30 in Schoharie	US 9W / US 20 in Albany	early 1970s	
NY 444	6.83	10.99	US 20 / NY 5 / NY 64 in East Bloomfield	NY 96 in Victor	1997	
NY 446	6.77	10.90	NY 16 in Hinsdale	NY 305 in Cuba	ca. 1975	
NY 448	3.85	6.20	US 9 in Sleepy Hollow	NY 117 in Mount Pleasant	early 1970s	
NY 454	14.00	22.53	NY 25 in Commack	NY 27 in Islip	1972	
NY 458	24.45	39.35	NY 11B in Hopkinton	NY 30 in Brighton	1972	
NY 470	2.89	4.65	NY 9R in Colonie	US 4 in Troy	1973	
NY 474	24.60	39.59	Pennsylvania line at French Creek; becomes PA 474	NY 394 in Busti	1972	
NY 481	31.80	51.18	I-81 / I-481 in North Syracuse	NY 104 in Oswego	1970	
NY 488	9.53	15.34	NY 21 in Hopewell	NY 96 in Phelps	1972	
NY 495	1.06	1.71	New Jersey line at Manhattan; becomes NJ 495	West 34th Street in Manhattan	early 1980s	The 2017 route log shows that NY 495 runs from I-278 to I-678 in Queens for 4.93 miles (7.93 km).
NY 531	7.56	12.17	NY 31 / NY 36 in Ogden	I-490 in Gates	1984	
NY 590	5.04	8.11	I-490 / I-590 in Rochester	Titus Avenue in Irondequoit	1980	Extension of Interstate 590
NY 598	2.29	3.69	NY 5 in Syracuse	NY 298 in Salina	ca. 2004	
NY 631	5.17	8.32	NY 48 in Lysander	NY 370 in Baldwinsville	1999	The 2017 route log shows that NY 631 begins at NY 31, 1.27 miles (2.04 km) from its actual southern terminus.
NY 635	2.29	3.69	NY 5 in East Syracuse	NY 298 in DeWitt	1980	
NY 690	6.77	10.90	I-90 / I-690 in Van Buren	NY 48 in Lysander	mid-1970s	Extension of Interstate 690
NY 695	2.40	3.86	NY 5 in Camillus	I-690 in Geddes	early 1980s	
NY 747	3.48	5.60	NY 207 in New Windsor	NY 17K in Montgomery	2007	
NY 787	2.66	4.28	I-787 / NY 7 in Colonie	NY 32 in Cohoes	by 1990	Extension of Interstate 787
NY 812	80.78	130.00	NY 12 / NY 26 in Lowville	Canadian border at Ogdensburg; becomes ON 16	1978	
NY 825	2.66	4.28	NY 49 in Rome	NY 46 in Rome	2002	
NY 840	4.15	6.68	NY 5 / NY 8 / NY 12 in Utica	Halsey Road in Whitestown	2005	
NY 878	5.70	9.17	Belt Parkway / NY 27 in Queens Burnside Avenue in Inwood	Farmers and Rockaway Boulevards in Queens Atlantic Beach Bridge in Lawrence	by 1991	The 2017 route log shows that NY 878 is a continuous route of 8.52 miles (13.71 km) that includes a connection of Rockaway Boulevard and Turnpike.
NY 890	1.10	1.77	I-890 in Rotterdam	NY 5 in Glenville	1998	Extension of Interstate 890 to connect with NY 5.
NY 895	1.35	2.17	I-278 in the Bronx	I-95 in the Bronx	2017	

== Signed reference routes ==
The 900 through 999 designations are reserved for reference routes, which are unsigned state-maintained highways of varying length. Four of these routes have been signed as touring routes and are listed below.

Route	Length (mi)	Length (km)	From	To	Formed	Notes
NY 961F	5.89	9.48	NY 70 in Burns	NY 36 in Arkport	mid-1970s	
NY 962J	0.41	0.66	NY 434 in Owego	NY 17C in Owego	2001	
NY 990L	1.44	2.32	NY 12 in Norwich city	NY 23 in Norwich town	Added to state highway system in 1954	
NY 990V	6.11	9.83	NY 30 in Gilboa	Schoharie CR 3 in Conesville	Unknown	

== Former routes ==
Route	Southern or western terminus	Northern or eastern terminus	Formed	Removed
NY 1	New York City line	Connecticut state line at Port Chester	1924	1927
NY 1A	NY 27 in Manhattan	US 1 in Pelham Manor	1934	ca. 1962
NY 1B	NY 1A in the Bronx	US 1 in New Rochelle	ca. 1932	ca. 1941
NY 1B	Triborough Bridge in The Bronx	Grand Concourse in The Bronx	ca. 1941	by 1947
NY 1X	Eastern Boulevard in The Bronx	NY 1A in The Bronx	1941	1946
NY 2	PA 2 at the Pennsylvania state line at Kirkwood	NY 6 in Rouses Point	1924	1927
NY 2	US 15 at the Pennsylvania state line at Lindley	NY 31 in Rochester	1927	ca. 1939
NY 2	NY 17 / NY 17C in Owego	NY 33 / NY 35 in Rochester	ca. 1939	early 1940s
NY 2A (mid-1920s-1927)	NY 2 in Potsdam	NY 2 / NY 56 in Lawrence	mid-1920s	1927
NY 2A (1930–1939)	NY 2 in Springwater	NY 2 in Rochester	1930	ca. 1939
NY 2A (1939-early 1940s)	NY 2 in Interlaken	US 20 / NY 5 in Waterloo	ca. 1939	early 1940s
NY 3A (1930–1932)	NY 3 / NY 271 in Middleport	NY 19 near Medina	1930	ca. 1932
NY 3A (1932-1935)	NY 3 / NY 425 in Lockport	NY 3 / NY 93 in Lockport	ca. 1932	ca. 1935
NY 3B (1930–1932)	NY 237 in Clarendon	NY 3 / NY 63 in Sweden	1930	ca. 1932
NY 3B (1932–1935)	NY 3 / NY 271 in Middleport	NY 19 near Medina	ca. 1932	ca. 1935
NY 3C (1930-1932)	NY 3 in Sterling	US 11 / NY 3 / NY 12 in Watertown	1930	ca. 1932
NY 3C (1932–1935)	NY 237 in Clarendon	NY 3 / NY 63 in Sweden	ca. 1932	ca. 1935
NY 3D (1931–1932)	NY 3 in New Haven	NY 3C in Mexico	ca. 1931	ca. 1932
NY 3D (1932-1935)	NY 3 in Sterling	US 11 / NY 3 / NY 12 in Watertown	ca. 1932	1935
NY 3E (1930–1932)	NY 3 in Red Creek	NY 3 in Oswego	1930	ca. 1932
NY 3E (1932–1935)	NY 3 in New Haven	NY 3D in Mexico	ca. 1932	1935
NY 3F (1931-1932)	NY 3 in Deferiet	NY 26 in Carthage	ca. 1931	ca. 1932
NY 3F (1932–1935)	NY 3 in Red Creek	NY 3 in Oswego	ca. 1932	1935
NY 3G	NY 3 in Deferiet	NY 3 in Wilna	ca. 1932	1940s
NY 4 (1924–1927)	Pennsylvania state line at Lindley	NY 3 in Rochester	1924	1927
NY 5A (1924-mid-1920s)	NY 5 in Buffalo	NY 5 in Albany	1924	mid-1920s
NY 5A (1933-1937)	US 20 / NY 5 in Aurelius	NY 5 in Sennett	ca. 1933	ca. 1937
NY 6 (1924-1927)	New York City line	Canadian border at Rouses Point	1924	1927
NY 6A	US 9 in Yonkers	US 9 in Tarrytown	mid-1920s	1930
NY 6B	NY 5 in East Greenbush	NY 6 in Waterford	mid-1920s	1927
NY 7 (1924-mid-1920s)	NY 6 in Troy	MA 7 at the Massachusetts state line at Stephentown	1924	mid-1920s
NY 7 (mid-1920s-1927)	NY 5 in Albany	NY 5 in Buffalo	mid-1920s	1927
NY 7B (1930–1970)	NY 7 in Unadilla	NY 7 / NY 28 in Oneonta	1930	1970
NY 7C	NY 7 in Niskayuna	NY 7 in Colonie	ca. 1961	late 1960s
NY 8 (1924–1930)	NJ 8 at the New Jersey state line at Minisink	US 9W in Newburgh	1924	1930
NY 9 (1924–1927)	NY 17 in Binghamton	Vermont state line at Hoosick	1924	1927
NY 9C (1920s-1930)	US 9 in Albany	US 9 in Round Lake	1920s	1930
NY 9C (1930-early 1930s)	NY 129 in Croton-on-Hudson	US 9 in Peekskill	1930	early 1930s
NY 9E	US 9 in Wappingers Falls	NY 376 in Wappinger	ca. 1933	ca. 1939
NY 9F	US 9 in Poughkeepsie	US 9 in Rhinebeck	1930	ca. 1938
NY 9K	US 9 / NY 50 in Saratoga Springs	US 9 in Lake George	1930	early 1950s
NY 9M	NY 8 in Horicon	US 9 in Chester	ca. 1931	ca. 1939
NY 9W (1927–1930)	US 9 in Elizabethtown	US 9 in Keeseville	1927	1930
NY 9X (1931–1936)	US 9 in Malta	US 9 / NY 50 in Saratoga Springs	ca. 1931	1935
NY 9X	US 9 in Manhattan	US 9 in The Bronx	1935	1940s
NY 10A (1920s-1930)	NY 10 in Long Lake	NY 10 in Johnsburg	late 1920s	1930
NY 11 (1924–1927)	NY 2 in Mexico	NY 5 / NY 12 in Utica	1924	1927
NY 12A (1928–1930)	NY 12 in Sherburne	NY 5 in New Hartford	1928	1930
NY 12C	NY 5 / NY 5S / NY 8 / NY 12 in Utica	NY 12 / NY 28 / NY 287 in Barneveld	1930	1970
NY 15 (1924–1939)	NY 17 / NY 17C in Owego	NY 33 / NY 35 in Rochester	1924	ca. 1939
NY 15A (1930–1939)	NY 15 in Interlaken	US 20 / NY 5 in Waterloo	1930	ca. 1939
NY 16A	PA 646 at the Pennsylvania state line at Allegany	NY 16 / NY 17 in Olean	ca. 1932	1962
NY 16B	NY 16 in West Seneca	NY 16 in West Seneca	ca. 1932	unknown
NY 17A (1920s-1930)	NY 17 in Randolph	NY 17 / NY 18 in Salamanca	mid-1920s	1930
NY 17D	NY 17 in Elmira	Pennsylvania state line at Chemung	1930	early 1940s
NY 17E	NY 17 in Corning	NY 17 in Elmira	1930	mid-1960s
NY 17F	NY 17 in Andover	NY 17 in Addison	1930	early 1940s
NY 17G	NY 19 in Willing	NY 17 / NY 248 in Greenwood	1930	early 1940s
NY 17H (1930–1937)	NY 17 in Randolph	NY 17 / NY 18 in Salamanca	1930	ca. 1937
NY 17H (1940s-1970s)	NY 17C in Johnson City	NY 17 in Binghamton	by 1940	1970s
NY 17J	NY 17 / NY 430 in Mayville	NY 17 in Jamestown	1930	1973
NY 18A	US 62 / NY 18 / NY 39 in Collins	US 62 / NY 18 in Eden	1930	1962
NY 18B	NY 240 in Orchard Park	US 62 / NY 18 / NY 324 in Amherst	ca. 1935	1962
NY 18C	NY 78 / NY 278 on Orchard Park – West Seneca town line	NY 35 / NY 78 in Depew	ca. 1932	ca. 1938
NY 18D	Whirlpool Rapids Bridge at Niagara Falls	US 62 / NY 18 in Wheatfield	ca. 1932	1962
NY 18E	Queenston–Lewiston Bridge at Lewiston	NY 18F in Lewiston	early 1930s	early 1960s
NY 18F (1934-1938)	NY 18 in Little Valley	NY 18 near Cattaraugus	ca. 1934	ca. 1938
NY 19 (1924–1930)	NY 23 in Roxbury	US 6N in Kingston	1924	1930
NY 20 (1924–1927)	NY 2 in Syracuse	NY 3 in Oswego	1924	1927
NY 20A (1930-1932)	Pennsylvania state line at Ripley	US 20 in Silver Creek	1930	ca. 1932
NY 20A (1938–1939)	US 20 in Hamburg	US 20 / NY 5 in Avon	ca. 1938	ca. 1939
NY 20B	US 20 in Brant	US 20 in Hamburg	1930	ca. 1932
NY 20C	NY 64 in Bloomfield	US 20 / NY 5 / NY 64 in Bloomfield	ca. 1931	1997
NY 20D	US 20 in Geneseo	NY 5 in Avon	ca. 1931	ca. 1938
NY 20N	US 20 / NY 174 in Marcellus town	US 20 / NY 20SY / NY 92 in Cazenovia	1937	1961
NY 20SY	US 20 / NY 321 in Skaneateles	US 20 / NY 20N / NY 92 in Cazenovia	1951	1961
NY 21 (1924–1930)	US 9 in Poughkeepsie	CT 4 at the Connecticut state line at Amenia	1924	1930
NY 21A	Vine Valley	US 20 / NY 5 in Canandaigua	1930	early 1940s
NY 24 (1924–1930)	NY 45 in Stephentown	NY 30 in Fort Ann	1924	1930
NY 24A	NY 24 / NY 25 in Queens	NY 110 in East Farmingdale	late 1950s	ca. 1962
NY 25C	NY 25 in Queens	NY 25 in Garden City Park	by 1940	1970
NY 25D	NY 24 / NY 25 in Queens	NY 25 in Westbury	early 1930s	1958
NY 26 (1924–1930)	NY 13 near Freeville	NY 5 in Camillus	1924	1930
NY 26A	NY 12 / NY 26 in Lowville	NY 3 in Carthage	1930	1978
NY 26B	NY 26 in Alexandria	NY 37 in Alexandria	ca. 1931	mid-1970s
NY 28B	NY 287 in Prospect	NY 12 / NY 28 in Remsen	ca. 1936	mid-1960s
NY 30 (1924–1930)	US 9 in Mechanicville	Canadian border at Mooers	1924	1930
NY 31A (Onondaga County)	NY 5 in Elbridge	NY 31 in Jordan	mid-1920s	1930
NY 31A (western Niagara County)	NY 3 / NY 18 in Niagara Falls	NY 31 on Lewiston–Cambria town line	late 1920s	1935
NY 31B (1932-1933)	US 11 in Cicero	NY 31 in Cicero	ca. 1932	ca. 1933
NY 31B	NY 31 in Weedsport	NY 5 in Elbridge	ca. 1933	1980
NY 31C	NY 5 in Elbridge	NY 31 in Jordan	ca. 1933	2003
NY 31D	Orleans–Monroe county line	NY 19 / NY 31 in Sweden	ca. 1935	ca. 1963
NY 32 (1920s-1930)	NY 5 in Amherst	Lake Road in Olcott	mid-1920s	1930
NY 32A (1930-early 1940s)	US 4 / NY 32 in Stillwater	US 4 / NY 32 in Schuylerville	1930	early 1940s
NY 32B	NY 32 in Queensbury	US 4 in Hudson Falls	1930	mid-1960s
NY 33B (1931-1940s)	NY 96 in Pittsford	NY 33 / NY 350 in Walworth	ca. 1931	1949
NY 33B (1962–1965)	NY 33A in Chili	NY 383 in Rochester	ca. 1962	ca. 1965
NY 33B (1965-1970s)	NY 33 in Buffalo	NY 33 in Cheektowaga	ca. 1965	mid-1970s
NY 34 (1924-1930)	NY 5 in Buffalo	Fort Niagara near Youngstown	1924	1930
NY 34A	NY 13 in Ithaca	NY 34 in Lansing	1930s	mid-1960s
NY 35 (mid-1920s-1927)	NY 16 in East Aurora	NY 4 near Livonia village	mid-1920s	1927
NY 35 (1927-early 1940s)	NY 36 in Wheatland	US 104 in Ontario	1927	early 1940s
NY 35A	US 62 / NY 18 in Buffalo	NY 35 in Cheektowaga	1930	mid-1930s
NY 35B	NY 35 / NY 47 in Rochester	NY 35 in Penfield	1930s	early 1940s
NY 36A	NY 36 in Dansville	NY 63 in Mount Morris	1930	early 1940s
NY 37 (mid-1920s-1927)	NY 17 in Monroe	Connecticut state line near Brewster	mid-1920s	1927
NY 37 (late 1920s-1930)	NY 40 in Cato	NY 31 in Baldwinsville	late 1920s	1930
NY 37A	NY 37 in Lisbon	NY 37 in Waddington	1930	1980
NY 37D	NY 37 in Theresa town	NY 26 in Theresa village	ca. 1936	mid-1960s
NY 38 (1920s-1930)	NY 62 near Angelica	NY 14 in Penn Yan	mid-1920s	1930
NY 39 (1920s-1930)	NY 21 in Poughkeepsie	NY 22 in Patterson	mid-1920s	1930
NY 40A	NY 40 in Schaghticoke	NY 40 / NY 67 in Schaghticoke	ca. 1933	late 1940s
NY 41 (1920s-1930)	Ferry landing at Barrytown	NY 22 in North East	mid-1920s	1930
NY 42 (1920s-1930)	NY 15 in Owego	NY 26 in Freeville	mid-1920s	1930
NY 44 (1920s-1930)	NY 7 in Sidney	NY 5 / NY 12 in Utica	mid-1920s	1930
NY 44 (1930–1935)	NY 13 in Caton	NY 3 in Wolcott	1930	1935
NY 44A	US 44 in Washington	US 44 / NY 82 in Millbrook	1980	2007
NY 45 (1920s-1930)	US 9E in Troy	MA 2 at the Massachusetts state line at Stephentown	mid-1920s	1930
NY 45 (1930-late 1949)	New Jersey state line at Warwick	US 9W in New Windsor	1930	1949
NY 46A	NY 49 / NY 365 in Rome	NY 46 in Western	1930	early 1950s
NY 47 (1920s-1930)	US 9 in Chestertown	NY 30 in Ticonderoga	mid-1920s	1930
NY 47 (1930–1936)	US 9 in Lake George	NY 8 in Hague	1930	1936
NY 47	NY 104 in Greece	Culver Road in Irondequoit	ca. 1937	1980
NY 48 (1920s-1930)	NY 12 in Lowville	NY 3 in Alexandria	mid-1920s	1930
NY 48A	NY 48 in Minetto	NY 48 in Oswego	ca. 1931	ca. 1940
NY 50 (mid-1920s-1927)	PA 7 at the Pennsylvania state line at Port Jervis	NY 10 in Kingston	mid-1920s	1927
NY 51 (1920s-1930)	NY 17 in Deposit	NY 23 in Stamford	mid-1920s	1930
NY 52 (1920s-1930)	NY 36 in Dansville	NY 14 near Geneva city	mid-1920s	1930
NY 53 (1920s-1930)	NY 13 in Horseheads	NY 15 in Candor	mid-1920s	1930
NY 54 (1920s-1930)	NY 5 / NY 12 in Utica	NY 5 in Fonda	mid-1920s	1930
NY 55 (1920s-1930)	New Jersey state line near Greenwood Lake	NY 17 in Goshen	late 1920s	1930
NY 56A	US 11 in Potsdam	NY 56 in Norfolk	1930	1980
NY 57	US 11 in Syracuse	NY 104 in Oswego	1927	1982
NY 58 (1920s-1930)	NY 17 in Harriman	NY 10 in Newburgh	mid-1920s	1930
NY 59A	NY 304 in Clarkstown	NY 59 in Clarkstown	1956	late 1950s
NY 61 (1920s-1934)	NY 59 in Suffern	US 9W in West Haverstraw	late 1920s	1934
NY 61 (1934-1940s)	NY 129 at Croton Reservoir	US 9 in Peekskill	1934	late 1940s
NY 62 (1920s-1930)	NY 17 in Amity	Lake Ontario shoreline in Yates	mid-1920s	1930
NY 62 (1930–1932)	NY 98 in Great Valley	NY 18 in Buffalo	1930	ca. 1932
NY 62A	NY 104 in Niagara Falls	US 62 in Niagara Falls	1970s	2006
NY 63A	NY 63 in Angelica	NY 63 in Nunda	1930	early 1940s
NY 64 (1920s-1930)	NY 51 in Delhi	NY 7 in Oneonta	mid-1920s	1930
NY 70 (1920s-1930)	US 11 in Homer	US 20 in Skaneateles	mid-1920s	1930
NY 70A	NY 70 in Burns	NY 36 in Dansville	ca. 1931	mid-1970s
NY 72 (1920s-1930)	NY 52 in Naples	Lake Road in Pultneyville	mid-1920s	1930
NY 72A	NY 56 in Potsdam	NY 72 in Hopkinton	1930	early 1940s
NY 74 (1920s-1930)	US 20 in Sheldon	Roosevelt Highway in Carlton	mid-1920s	1930
NY 74 (1930–1973)	Pennsylvania state line at French Creek	NY 17J near Lakewood	1930	ca. 1973
NY 75 (1930–1932)	NY 426 in Mina	NY 17 / NY 17J in Mayville	1930	ca. 1932
NY 76 (1927–1930)	US 11 in Mexico	NY 5 / NY 12 / NY 28 in Utica	1927	1930
NY 77A	Tonawanda Indian Reservation boundary in Alabama	NY 77 in Alabama	ca. 1935	late 1930s
NY 78 (1927-1930)	NY 14 in Watkins Glen	US 20 / NY 5 near Geneva	ca. 1927	1930
NY 78A	NY 78 in East Aurora	NY 35 in Lancaster	ca. 1932	ca. 1938
NY 82A	US 44 in Amenia	NY 82 in Pine Plains	1930	1980
NY 84	NJ 84 at the New Jersey state line at Minisink	NY 17K in Montgomery	1930	1966
NY 86A	NY 86 in Lake Placid	US 9 in Elizabethtown	1930	1952
NY 87	US 11 in De Kalb	NY 37 in Ogdensburg	1930	1978
NY 89A	US 20 / NY 5 in Seneca Falls	NY 89 in Tyre	early 1950s	late 1950s
NY 94 (1930-early 1940s)	NY 17 in Portville	NY 19 in Belfast	1930	early 1940s
NY 94 (early 1940s-1949)	New Jersey state line at Chestnut Ridge	US 202 in Haverstraw	early 1940s	1949
NY 96 (1930-early 1940s)	US 4 / NY 7 in Troy	MA 2 at the Massachusetts state line at Petersburgh	1930	early 1940s
NY 99	NY 30 in Duane	NY 3 in Franklin	1930	1994
NY 104 (early 1930s)	Atlantic Beach Bridge in Lawrence	NY 27 in Queens	early 1930s	by 1932
NY 104 (1932-1936)	NY 137 in Pound Ridge	CT 29 at the Connecticut state line at Pound Ridge	ca. 1932	ca. 1936
NY 113 (1930–1972)	NY 27 in Quogue	NY 24 in Riverhead	1930	1972
NY 115 (1932-1970s)	Merrick Road in Wantagh	NY 107 in Bethpage	ca. 1932	early 1970s
NY 119A	US 1 in Rye	NY 119 / NY 120 in Harrison	ca. 1939	1960
NY 120B	NY 120 in Rye	NY 120 in North Castle	early 1930s	ca. 1939
NY 122 (1931–1934)	NY 129 at Croton Reservoir	US 9 in Peekskill	ca. 1931	1934
NY 126 (1930-1936)	US 1 in Mamaroneck	NY 125 in White Plains	1930	ca. 1936
NY 126 (1940–1972)	I-81 / US 104 in Mexico	NY 13 in Williamstown	ca. 1940	ca. 1972
NY 130 (1930-1938)	US 6 in Peekskill	NY 301 in Kent	1930	ca. 1938
NY 131 (1930-mid-1940s)	NY 129 in Cortlandt	NY 129 in Yorktown	ca. 1931	mid-1940s
NY 132A	Dead end in Yorktown	US 202 / NY 35 in Yorktown	1930	early 1970s
NY 135 (1930-1935)	NY 134 in Ossining	NY 134 in Yorktown	1930	ca. 1935
NY 135 (1937-1939)	US 20 / NY 5 in Aurelius	NY 5 in Sennett	ca. 1937	ca. 1939
NY 136 (1931–1938)	NY 22 in North Castle	Connecticut state line	ca. 1931	ca. 1938
NY 137A	NY 137 in Pound Ridge	Connecticut state line at Pound Ridge	1930	ca. 1932
NY 140 (1932–1936)	NY 131 at Croton Reservoir	NY 132A at FDR State Park	ca. 1932	ca. 1936
NY 142 (1931-1938)	NY 100 in Mount Pleasant	NY 100 in Hawthorne	ca. 1931	ca. 1938
NY 146B	NY 146 in Clifton Park	Miller and Sugarhill Roads in Clifton Park	ca. 1932	ca. 1965
NY 146C	NY 7 in Rotterdam	NY 146 in Rotterdam	mid-1930s	ca. 1962
NY 148 (1930–1960)	NY 7 in Schoharie	NY 30 in Mayfield	1930	1960
NY 152	US 4 / NY 43 in North Greenbush	NY 150 in Sand Lake	1930	1980
NY 153 (1932-1940s)	NY 154 in Poestenkill	NY 2 in Brunswick	ca. 1932	early 1940s
NY 153 (1962-early 1980s)	NY 22 in Salem	VT 153 at the Vermont state line at Salem	ca. 1962	early 1980s
NY 154	NY 66 in Troy	Rensselaer CR 77 in Poestenkill	ca. 1932	1980
NY 161A	NY 161 in Florida	NY 30 in Florida	ca. 1931	ca. 1938
NY 164 (1930-1940)	NY 10 in Cobleskill	US 20 in Sharon	1930	ca. 1940
NY 164 (1940-1960s)	US 9 / NY 9A in Yonkers	US 1 in The Bronx	ca. 1940	1960s
NY 179 (1930-1963)	NY 3 in Hounsfield	NY 12 / NY 12E in Clayton	1930	ca. 1963
NY 181 (1930–1939)	NY 12 in Clayton	NY 37 in Theresa	1930	ca. 1939
NY 181 (1960–1963)	NY 12 in Pamelia	NY 3 in Black River	1960	ca. 1963
NY 182 (1933–1935)	NY 3D at Palermo	US 11 in Hastings	ca. 1933	1935
NY 182 (1935–1939)	US 11 in Hastings	NY 49 in Constantia	1935	ca. 1939
NY 185 (1930s-1980)	NY 37 in Hammond	Brasie Corners – Rossie Road in Rossie	ca. 1931	1980
NY 186 (1931-1982)	NY 812 in De Kalb	NY 68 in Canton	ca. 1931	1982
NY 187 (1930–1938)	NY 11B in Lawrence	NY 30 in Malone	1930	ca. 1938
NY 188 (1930–1939)	NY 37 in Westville	US 11 in Burke	1930	ca. 1939
NY 188 (1969–1970)	NY 17 in Owego	NY 17 / NY 26 in Vestal	1969	1970
NY 191	NY 22 in Chazy	US 9 in Chazy	1930	2015
NY 192	NY 30 in Brighton	NY 86 in Harrietstown	1930	1989
NY 192A	NY 86 in Harrietstown	NY 192 in Brighton	early 1950s	1980
NY 194	NY 177 in Pinckney	NY 12 in Copenhagen	1930	1980
NY 195 (1930–1936)	US 9 in Elizabethtown	NY 22 in Westport	1930	1936
NY 195	NY 11B in Lawrence	US 11 in Lawrence	ca. 1938	1980
NY 198 (1932-1940s)	NY 33A / NY 251 in Chili	NY 383 in Chili	ca. 1932	1949
NY 200 (1930-early 1940s)	US 44 / NY 22 in Amenia	CT 343 at the Connecticut state line at Amenia	1930	early 1940s
NY 201 (1930-1950s)	NY 199 in Pine Plains	NY 22 in Copake	1930	early 1950s
NY 202 (1930–1935)	NY 52 in East Fishkill	NY 55 in Poughkeepsie	1930	1935
NY 204 (1930-1940s)	US 20 in Nassau	NY 295 in Chatham	1930	early 1940s
NY 209 (1930–1935)	NY 19 in Shelby	NY 18 in Carlton	1930	1935
NY 215 (1930–1939)	NY 17 near Bloomingburg	US 9W / NY 32 in Newburgh	1930	ca. 1939
NY 215 (1940s-1970s)	NY 360 in Hamlin	Hamlin Beach State Park south boundary in Hamlin	early 1940s	early 1970s
NY 218 (1930-early 1940s)	NY 41 in Coventry	NY 7 in Bainbridge	1930	early 1940s
NY 219 (1930–1935)	NY 26 / NY 79 in Whitney Point	NY 12 / NY 41 in Greene	1930	ca. 1935
NY 225 (1930-late 1940s)	NY 17 in Tioga	NY 223 in Spencer	1930	late 1940s
NY 229	NY 34 in Lansing	NY 38 in Fleming	1930	ca. 1939
NY 231 (1931–1939)	NY 414 in Butler	NY 38 in Conquest	ca. 1931	ca. 1939
NY 232 (1933-1940s)	NY 17G in Rexville	NY 21 in Troupsburg	ca. 1933	1950
NY 234	NY 26 in Vernon	NY 31 / NY 365 in Verona	ca. 1932	1981
NY 236 (1931–1939)	NY 17 in Hancock	NY 10 in Tompkins	ca. 1931	ca. 1939
NY 239	NY 354 in Marilla	US 20 in Alden	1930	1980
NY 252A	NY 33A / NY 386 in Chili	NY 383 in Chili	late 1950s	2009
NY 254 (1930–1940)	US 20A in Geneseo	US 20 / NY 5 in Avon	1930	ca. 1940
NY 255	NY 256 in Sparta	NY 15 in Conesus	1930	1995
NY 257 (1935-1941)	US 9W in Highland Falls	US 9W in Cornwall-on-Hudson	1935	1941
NY 264 (1930-1932)	NY 18 in Cattaraugus	East Otto	1930	ca. 1932
NY 265 (1931–1936)	NY 5 in Clarence	NY 267 in Clarence	ca. 1931	ca. 1936
NY 266 (1931–1935)	NY 78 in Clarence	NY 267 in Clarence	ca. 1931	ca. 1935
NY 267 (1931–1935)	NY 5 in Clarence	NY 263 in Clarence	ca. 1931	ca. 1935
NY 267	NY 93 in Akron	NY 77 in Alabama	ca. 1935	1980
NY 268 (1934–1974)	NY 5 in Clarence	NY 78 on Clarence–Amherst town line	ca. 1934	ca. 1974
NY 273 (1931-early 1940s)	NY 53 in Italy Hill	NY 54A in Branchport	ca. 1931	early 1940s
NY 273	US 4 near Whitehall village	NY 22A in Hampton	1949	1980
NY 274 (1933-1940s)	NY 36 in Troupsburg	NY 17 in Woodhull	ca. 1933	early 1940s
NY 276 (1930s)	NY 305 south of Clarksville	NY 275 in Bolivar	1930	ca. 1939
NY 276 (1940s)	NY 27A in Massapequa Park	NY 27 in Massapequa Park	ca. 1941	late 1940s
NY 278 (1930–1935)	NY 75 in Boston	NY 16 in Holland	1930	ca. 1935
NY 278 (1935-1938)	US 20 in Hamburg	NY 78 in Orchard Park	ca. 1935	ca. 1938
NY 279 (1931–1933)	NY 39 in Sardinia	NY 16 in Sardinia	ca. 1931	ca. 1933
NY 279 (1933–1935)	US 6 in Port Jervis	US 9W in Kingston	1933	1935
NY 283 (1930–1970)	NY 282 in Nichols	NY 17 in Owego	1930	1970
NY 283 (1970s)	US 11 in Antwerp	NY 12 in Alexandria Bay	mid-1970s	by 1981
NY 284 (1930–1939)	NY 52 in Callicoon	NY 17 in Rockland	1930	ca. 1939
NY 285	NY 69 in Annsville	Oneida CR 67A / CR 70 in Florence	1930	1988
NY 286 (1930-early 1940s)	NY 22 in Granville	VT 30A at the Vermont state line at Hampton	1930	1945
NY 286A (1938-1939)	NY 286 in Hampton	VT 286A at the Vermont state line at Hampton	ca. 1938	ca. 1939
NY 286A	NY 47 in Penfield	NY 286 in Penfield	1949	early 1970s
NY 287 (1930–1970)	NY 12 / NY 12C / NY 28 in Barneveld	NY 8 in Ohio	1930	1970
NY 287 (1970s)	NY 283 in Alexandria	NY 37 in Alexandria	mid-1970s	1979
NY 288 (1930-1940)	US 11 in Sandy Creek	Boylston	1930	ca. 1940
NY 288	NY 161 in Glen	NY 5S in Glen	early 1940s	1981
NY 291 (1930-1940s)	NY 2 / NY 14 in Phelps	NY 89 in Tyre	1930	early 1940s
NY 292 (1935–1938)	NY 54A in Jerusalem	Bluff Point	ca. 1935	ca. 1938
NY 293 (1930–1933)	NY 31 in Weedsport	NY 5 in Elbridge	1930	ca. 1933
NY 297 (1931-ca. 1936)	NY 23 in South Gilboa	NY 30 in Gilboa	1931	ca. 1936
NY 298 (1930-1934)	NY 9G in Germantown	US 9 in Clermont	1930	ca. 1934
NY 305 (1930-early 1940s)	New Jersey state line at Chestnut Ridge	US 202 in Haverstraw	1930	early 1940s
NY 307	NY 32 in Cornwall	NY 218 in Cornwall	1930s	1980
NY 310 (1930s-1960s)	NY 85A in Voorheesville	US 20 in Guilderland	1930s	mid-1960s
NY 312 (1930–1937)	NY 52 in Patterson	NY 22 in Patterson	1930	ca. 1937
NY 314 (1930-1950s)	NY 7 in Schenevus	Westford	1930	mid-1950s
NY 317 (1930-early 1940s)	NY 28 in Newport	Norway	1930	early 1940s
NY 317 (early 1940s-1980)	NY 7 in Troy	NY 142 in Brunswick	early 1940s	1980
NY 318 (1931-1950s)	NY 12D in Leyden	NY 12 in Port Leyden	ca. 1931	late 1950s
NY 319	Chenango CR 4 / CR 10 / CR 19 in Preston	NY 12 in Norwich	1930	1984
NY 323	NY 249 in Brant	NY 5 in Evans	1930	1980
NY 324 (1932–1933)	East Eden	US 62 in Hamburg	ca. 1932	ca. 1933
NY 325 (1932–1933)	NY 96 in Ithaca	Taughannock Falls State Park in Ulysses	ca. 1932	ca. 1933
NY 328A	PA 549 at the Pennsylvania state line at Southport	NY 328 in Southport	1930	ca. 1935
NY 330	76 Road in Caroline	NY 79 in Dryden	ca. 1931	1980
NY 333	Steuben CR 11 / CR 24 in Thurston	NY 415 in Campbell	1930	1997
NY 337 (1930-1933)	NY 41 in Spafford	NY 174 in Marcellus	1930	ca. 1933
NY 337 (1935–1972)	NY 12D / NY 26 in West Turin	NY 12 in Lyons Falls	ca. 1935	ca. 1972
NY 338 (1930s)	NY 248 in Whitesville	Pennsylvania state line	ca. 1931	ca. 1939
NY 338 (1940s-1980)	NY 29 in Northumberland	US 4 / NY 32 in Schuylerville	1940s	1980
NY 338 (1980–1996)	NY 40 in Argyle	NY 29 in Greenwich	1980	1996
NY 339 (1932–1937)	NY 17 in Ramapo	US 202 in Suffern	ca. 1932	ca. 1937
NY 339	NY 50 in Ballston	NY 146A in Ballston	by 1946	early 1970s
NY 341 (early 1930s-1934)	NY 22 in Dover	CT 55 at the Connecticut state line at Dover	early 1930s	ca. 1934
NY 341	NY 22 / NY 55 in Pawling	Connecticut state line at Pawling	ca. 1934	1940s
NY 342 (1930-1940s)	NY 23 in Gilboa	Schoharie CR 18 in Conesville	1930	late 1940s
NY 347 (1930–1934)	NY 22 in Crown Point	VT 17 at the Vermont state line at Crown Point	1930	ca. 1934
NY 347 (1934–1952)	NY 22 in Ticonderoga	Ferry landing in Ticonderoga	ca. 1934	1952
NY 348	NY 22 in Chazy	US 9 in Chazy	1930	1980
NY 351 (1931-1970s)	NY 436 in Portage	NY 408 in Nunda	ca. 1931	mid-1970s
NY 352 (1931-1938)	NY 25A in Riverhead	Wildwood State Park west entrance	ca. 1931	ca. 1938
NY 355 (1930–1937)	NY 33 in Cheektowaga	NY 5 in Williamsville	1930	ca. 1937
NY 356	NY 265 in City of Tonawanda	NY 270 in Amherst	1930	1988
NY 357 (1933-1940s)	Letchworth State Park	NY 39 in Castile	ca. 1933	early 1940s
NY 358	US 20A in Wales	US 20 in Alden	1930	1982
NY 359 (1930-early 1940s)	NY 77 in Royalton	US 104 in Hartland	1930	early 1940s
NY 360	NY 272 in Hamlin	NY 19 in Hamlin	ca. 1931	2012
NY 361 (1931-1935)	Blaine	NY 5S in Canajoharie	ca. 1931	1935
NY 361	Connecticut state line at North East; continued as CT 361	US 44 in Millerton	1935	1980
NY 363 (1930-1931)	Blaine	NY 5S in Canajoharie	1930	ca. 1931
NY 363 (1932-1950s)	NY 15A in Mendon	NY 65 in Honeoye Falls	ca. 1932	late 1950s
NY 365 (1930-early 1930s)	NY 17 in Big Flats	Chambers Road / Cowan Road in Catlin	1930	by 1932
NY 368	NY 321 in Elbridge	NY 5 in Elbridge	1930s	1980
NY 376 (1930-1933)	NY 32 in Esopus	NY 213 in Rosendale	1930	1933
NY 379	NY 14 in Southport	NY 427 in Southport	ca. 1931	1978
NY 380	NY 60 in Gerry	NY 5 near Brocton	1930	1980
NY 381	NY 43 in Rensselaer	US 4 in East Greenbush	ca. 1938	late 1960s
NY 382	NY 17 in Red House	Allegany State Park west boundary in Red House	ca. 1932	early 1970s
NY 383 (1930–1935)	NY 93 in Akron	NY 5 in Akron	1930	ca. 1935
NY 383 (1935-early 1940s)	NY 26 / NY 79 in Whitney Point	NY 12 / NY 41 in Greene	ca. 1935	early 1940s
NY 383B	NY 47 / NY 383 in Rochester	NY 383 in Penfield	early 1940s	late 1940s
NY 385 (1930–1932)	NY 31 in Murray	NY 18 in Kendall	1930	ca. 1932
NY 388	NY 33 in West Walworth	NY 35 in West Walworth	ca. 1931	early 1940s
NY 389	NY 14A / NY 245 southwest of Geneva	US 20 / NY 5 west of Geneva	ca. 1931	early 1940s
NY 390 (1930-1960s)	US 20 / NY 5 / NY 414 in Seneca Falls	NY 318 in Tyre	1930	mid-1960s
NY 390A	US 20 / NY 5 in Seneca Falls	NY 89 on Tyre – Seneca Falls town line	1930s	late 1950s
NY 392 (1936-1970s)	NY 79 in Ithaca	NY 366 in Dryden	ca. 1936	mid-1970s
NY 393	NY 13 in Ithaca	Game Farm Road on Ithaca–Dryden town line	ca. 1933	mid-1960s
NY 394 (1930-1935)	NY 361 in Canajoharie	NY 162 in Root	1930	ca. 1935
NY 394 (1936-1967)	NY 137 in Pound Ridge	CT 29 at the Connecticut state line at Pound Ridge	ca. 1935	1967
NY 398	NY 9J in Stuyvesant	US 9 in Stuyvesant	ca. 1932	1980
NY 399	NY 29 in Johnstown	NY 29A in Johnstown	1935	by 1961
NY 400 (1930)	US 9 in Stockport	Stockport	1930s	by 1935
NY 400 (1939)	NY 9H in Kinderhook	NY 203 in Valatie	by 1939	early 1950s
NY 401 (1930s-1950s)	US 9 in Stockport	NY 9H in Ghent	1930s	early 1950s
NY 401 (1970–1973)	NY 36 in Dansville	NY 21 near Wayland village	1970	ca. 1973
NY 402	Ferry landing in Tivoli	NY 9G in Tivoli	early 1930s	1980
NY 404 (1933-1940s)	NY 100 in Briarcliff Manor	US 9 near Ossining	1933	late 1940s
NY 405	US 4 in North Greenbush	NY 66 in Troy	early 1970s	1980
NY 407	NY 159 in Duanesburg	NY 160 in Florida	ca. 1931	1981
NY 408 (1930–1938)	NY 86 in Harrietstown	NY 192 in Brighton	1930	ca. 1938
NY 408A	NY 408 near Angelica village	NY 351 / NY 408 in Nunda	early 1940s	1949
NY 409 (1930-1938)	NY 3 in Hounsfield	NY 12E in Hounsfield	1930	ca. 1938
NY 413	Forks Road in Plainfield	US 20 in Plainfield	ca. 1931	early 1950s
NY 415 (1930-mid-1960s)	NY 290 in East Syracuse	NY 298 in Collamer	1930	mid-1960s
NY 417 (1932-1950s)	NY 7 in Otego	Otego	ca. 1932	mid-1950s
NY 419 (1933-1935)	NY 29 east of Schuylerville	US 4 north of Schuylerville	ca. 1933	ca. 1935
NY 422	NY 16 / NY 78 in Elma	NY 358 in Marilla	ca. 1931	1980
NY 424	NY 380 in Stockton	NY 60 in Cassadaga	1930	1980
NY 427 (1931–1938)	NY 9N in Keene	US 9 in Elizabethtown	ca. 1931	ca. 1938
NY 428	NY 39 in Forestville	US 20 in Silver Creek	ca. 1932	1980
NY 432 (1935-1940)	NY 22 in Canaan	Massachusetts state line at Canaan	ca. 1935	1940
NY 432	Myers Creek in Rathbone	NY 417 in Addison	early 1940s	1998
NY 433 (1937-1940)	NY 30 in Middleburgh	NY 7 in Cobleskill	ca. 1937	ca. 1940
NY 433 (1950s-1960s)	NY 5 in Syracuse	NY 298 in Salina	early 1950s	mid-1960s
NY 434 (1940s)	NY 23 in Plymouth	NY 12 in North Norwich	ca. 1940	early 1940s
NY 435	NY 167 in Manheim	NY 5 in Manheim	ca. 1940	early 1940s
NY 436 (1950s-1960s)	NY 433 in DeWitt	Carrier Circle in DeWitt	early 1950s	mid-1960s
NY 439	NJ 439 at the New Jersey state line at Staten Island	St. George ferry landing on Staten Island	1949	ca. 1968
NY 439A	NY 440 on Staten Island	NY 439 on Staten Island	late 1940s	ca. 1968
NY 456	NY 22 in Beekmantown	US 9 in Beekmantown	1970	2015

- NY 1, NY 4, NY 6, NY 9, NY 9W, NY 11, NY 15, NY 15A, NY 20, NY 44, NY 62, NY 104, NY 202, NY 209, and NY 219 were removed due to the creation of the U.S. highways with the same number.

== Reserved routes ==
- NY 181
- NY 188
- NY 229 - Reserved for NY 7 between NY 7A and the New York-Pennsylvania state line. Once reserved (circa 1967) for the Nassau Expressway (now NY 878) east of the proposed Clearview Expressway near John F. Kennedy Airport.
- NY 341 - Reserved for Cortland County
- NY 381
- NY 382 - Reserved for NY 88
- NY 388
- NY 393 - Reserved for Chautauqua Lakeway between I-86/NY 17 and NY 5
- NY 399 - Reserved for Hudson River Expressway
- NY 413 - Reserved for NY 9A
- NY 435 - Reserved for NY 29A between NY 30A and NY 10
- NY 450
- NY 451
- NY 452
- NY 478 - Reserved for Henry Hudson Parkway
- NY 484
- NY 485
- NY 486
- NY 487
- NY 490
- NY 546 - Reserved for Balltown Road
- NY 646 - Reserved for an old alignment of NY 146 in Schenectady
- NY 656 - Reserved for NY 911E
- NY 790 - Reserved for NY 49 and NY 365 (Utica-Rome Expressway, and dual carriageway Verona to Rome)
- NY 819
- NY 822
- NY 823
- NY 836
- NY 841
- NY 852
- NY 854
- NY 856
- NY 862 - Reserved for NY 920P (Riverside Drive)
- NY 866

== See also ==
- List of state highways in the United States
