= New York State Route 962J =

Highway in New York

New York State Route 962J
- NY 962J highlighted in red

Route information
- Maintained by NYSDOT
- Length: 0.41 mi (660 m)
- Existed: 2001–present

Major junctions
- Southwest end: Future I-86 / NY 17 / Southern Tier Expressway / NY 434 in Owego
- Northeast end: NY 17C in Owego

Location
- Country: United States
- State: New York
- Counties: Tioga

Highway system
- New York Highways; Interstate; US; State; Reference; Parkways
← NY 961F	→ I-990

New York State Route 962J (NY 962J) is a 0.41-mile-long (0.66 km) southwest-northeast reference route that, unlike most reference routes, has been signed as a touring route in Southern Tier town of Owego in Tioga County, New York. Its southwestern terminus is at NY 17 and NY 434 in the census-designated place of Apalachin and its northeastern terminus is at NY 17C south of the hamlet of Campville.

== Route description ==
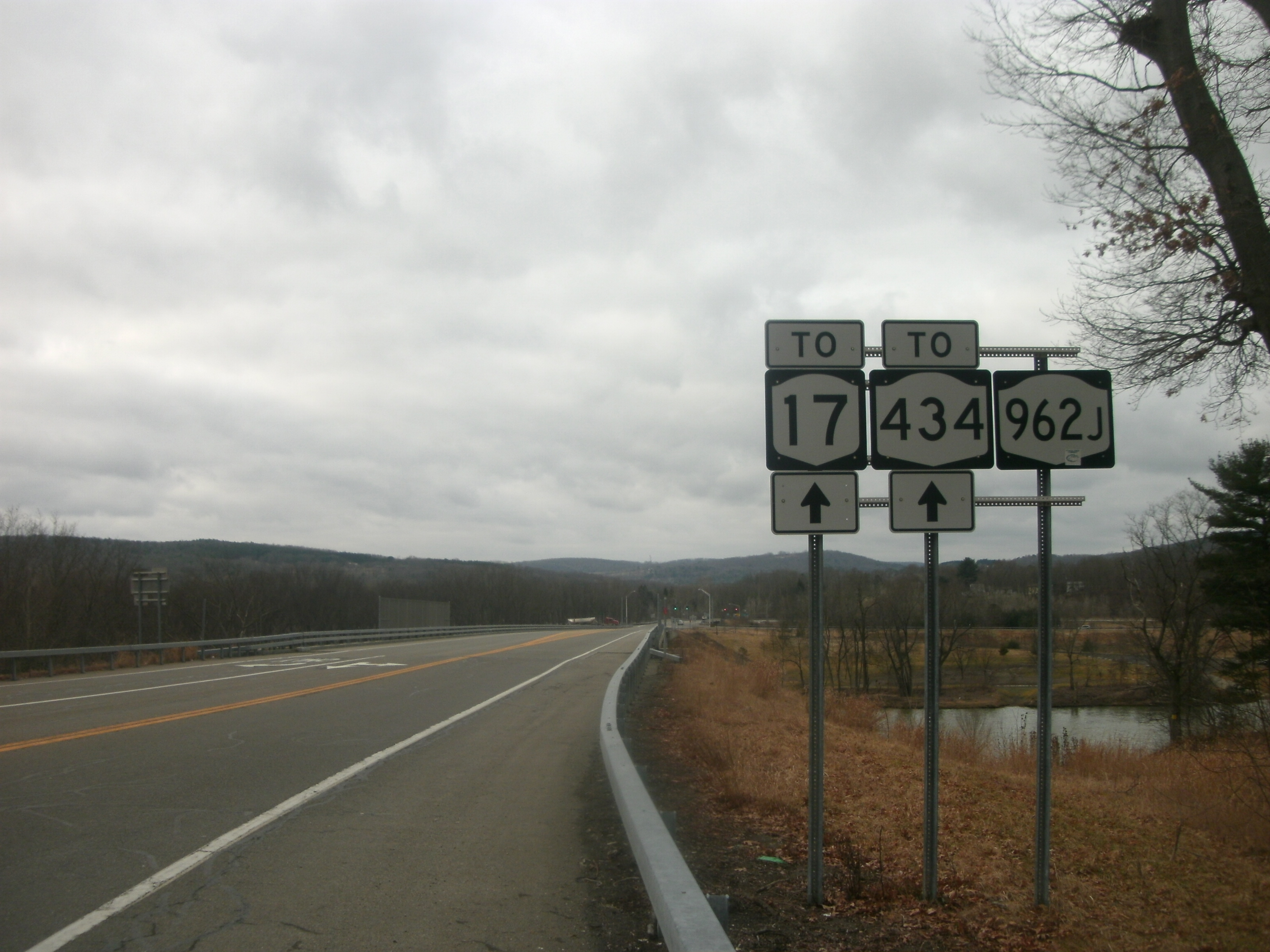
NY 962J heading southbound from NY 17C in Owego

Shortly after NY 962J begins at NY 434, it passes over NY 17 (Future I-86) (the Southern Tier Expressway) and intersects the new ramps that lead to and from NY 17 westbound. This portion was previously part of the trumpet-style interchange that NY 17 westbound had with NY 434 at exit 66. NY 962J continues to the northeast crossing over the Susquehanna River.

On the other bank of the river, the highway passes over the Norfolk Southern-owned Southern Tier Line before reaching its northeastern terminus at NY 17C.

== History ==
The bridge over the Susquehanna and the reconfiguration of the westbound ramps at exit 66 were completed in 2001, offering a convenient connector route across the Susquehanna. It was designated as a reference route at that time and marked as a touring route in early 2005. NY 962J was one of four reference routes in New York State signed as a touring route, until 2025. In 2025 crews removed the touring route signage while upgrading the signs from NY17 to Interstate 86.

== Major intersections ==
The entire route is in Tioga County.

Location	mi	km	Destinations	Notes
Apalachin	0.00	0.00	Future I-86 east / NY 17 east / Southern Tier Expressway east / NY 434 – Apalachin	Southwestern terminus
Town of Owego	0.15	0.24	Future I-86 west / NY 17 west / Southern Tier Expressway west	Exit 66 on NY 17
Town of Owego	0.41	0.66	NY 17C – Campville	Northeastern terminus
1.000 mi = 1.609 km; 1.000 km = 0.621 mi

== See also ==
- NY 961F, NY 990L, and NY 990V – Other reference routes signed as touring routes
