= Burns, New York =

- Town
- Location within New York
- Coordinates: 42°26′29″N 77°46′38″W
- Country: United States
- State: New York
- County: Allegany

Government
  - Type: Town Council
  - Town Supervisor: Gary Gilbert (D, R)
  - Town Council: Members' List: • Geoffrey Norton (D, R); • Lois Harvey (D, R); • Daniel Swauger (D, R); • Ernest Gordon (D, R)

Area
  - Total: 27.25 sq mi (70.59 km^{2})
  - Land: 27.22 sq mi (70.50 km^{2})
  - Water: 0.035 sq mi (0.09 km^{2})
- Elevation: 1,417 ft (432 m)

Population (2020)
  - Total: 1,045 ▼
  - Estimate (2021): 1,037
  - Density: 41/sq mi (15.9/km^{2})
- Time zone: UTC-5 (Eastern (EST))
  - Summer (DST): UTC-4 (EDT)
- ZIP Codes: 14822 (Canaseraga); 14807 (Arkport); 14437 (Dansville)
- FIPS code: 36-003-11253
- GNIS feature ID: 0978767
- Website: townofburnsny.gov

Burns is a town in Allegany County, New York, United States. The population was 1,045 at the 2020 census. The town is named after Scots poet Robert Burns.

The town lies in the northeast corner of Allegany County, northwest of Hornell.

== History ==
The area of Burns was first settled circa 1805. From the beginning, Canaseraga was the major settlement in the town. The town was formed in 1826 from part of the town of Ossian in Livingston County. Most people think that the town was named Burns because Canaseraga had a large fire that burned down much of the town. However, it was actually named after the Scottish romantic poet, Robert Burns.

== Geography ==
According to the United States Census Bureau, the town has a total area of 27.2 square miles (70 km^{2}), of which 27.2 square miles (70 km^{2}) is land and 0.04% is water.

The north town line is the border of Livingston County, and the east town line is the border of Steuben County.

New York State Route 70 crosses the north part of the town and passes through Canaseraga.

== Demographics ==
Historical population
Census	Pop.	Note	%±
1830	702		—
1840	867		23.5%
1850	943		8.8%
1860	1,064		12.8%
1870	1,340		25.9%
1880	1,671		24.7%
1890	1,506		−9.9%
1900	1,424		−5.4%
1910	1,524		7.0%
1920	1,214		−20.3%
1930	1,152		−5.1%
1940	1,187		3.0%
1950	1,185		−0.2%
1960	1,238		4.5%
1970	1,256		1.5%
1980	1,211		−3.6%
1990	1,299		7.3%
2000	1,248		−3.9%
2010	1,180		−5.4%
2020	1,045		−11.4%
2021 (est.)	1,037		−0.8%
U.S. Decennial Census

As of the census of 2000, there were 1,248 people, 456 households, and 340 families residing in the town. The population density was 45.9 inhabitants per square mile (17.7/km^{2}). There were 541 housing units at an average density of 19.9 per square mile (7.7/km^{2}). The racial makeup of the town was 97.84% White, 0.02% African American, 0.72% Native American, 0.08% Asian, 0.64% from other races, and 0.72% from two or more races. Hispanic or Latino of any race were 0.96% of the population.

There were 456 households, out of which 36.2% had children under the age of 18 living with them, 59.9% were married couples living together, 10.3% had a female householder with no husband present, and 25.4% were non-families. 19.7% of all households were made up of individuals, and 6.6% had someone living alone who was 65 years of age or older. The average household size was 2.74 and the average family size was 3.08.

In the town, the population was spread out, with 29.6% under the age of 18, 6.1% from 18 to 24, 28.8% from 25 to 44, 23.5% from 45 to 64, and 11.9% who were 65 years of age or older. The median age was 37 years. For every 100 females, there were 102.9 males. For every 100 females age 18 and over, there were 105.1 males.

The median income for a household in the town was $33,152, and the median income for a family was $37,054. Males had a median income of $32,120 versus $21,181 for females. The per capita income for the town was $14,613. About 10.4% of families and 12.3% of the population were below the poverty line, including 20.7% of those under age 18 and 2.7% of those age 65 or over.

== Communities and locations in the Town of Burns ==
- Burns – A hamlet at the eastern town line on County Route 14 (CR 14). It was formerly called DeWittsville.
- Burns Station – A former community in the town.
- Canaseraga – A village at the northern town line on NY 70 and Canaseraga Creek.
- Canaseraga Creek – A stream in the northern part of the town and tributary of the Genesee River.
- Garwoods – A hamlet in the northwest corner of the town at the intersection of NY 70 and CR 15B.
- Gas Spring – A location in the southwest corner of the town.
- Mastin Corners – A location near the western town line at the west end of CR 13C.
