= List of county routes in Broome County, New York =

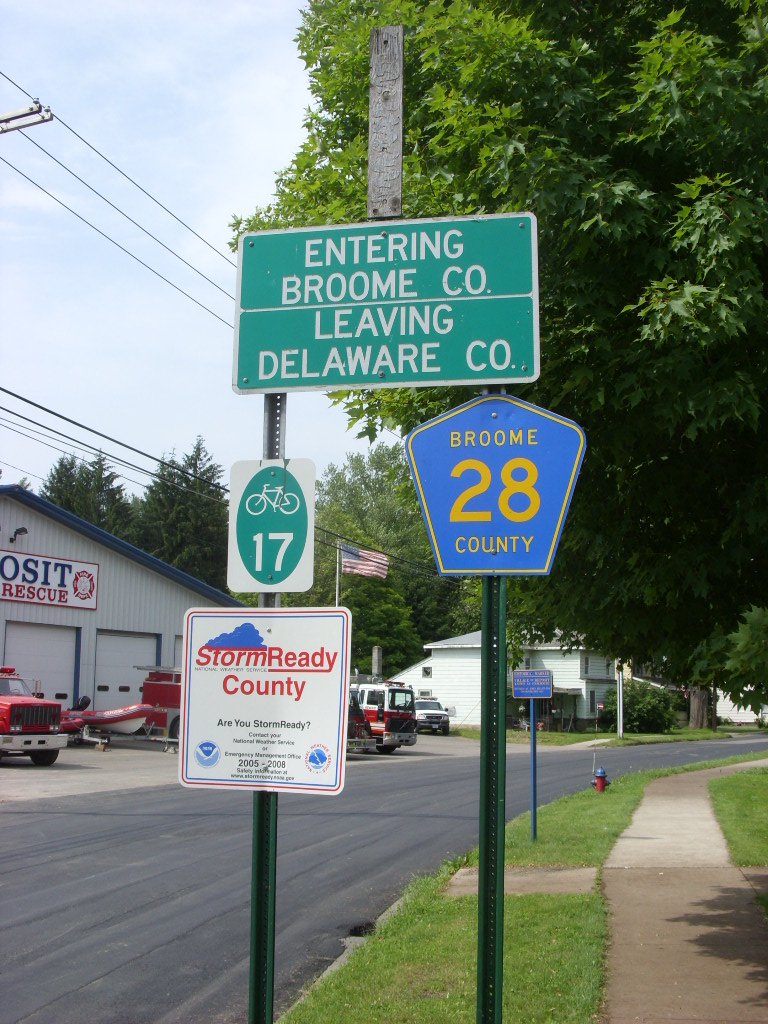
A sign marks the eastern terminus of Broome County Route 28 in Deposit, New York.

County routes in Broome County, New York, United States, are signed with the Manual on Uniform Traffic Control Devices-standard yellow-on-blue pentagon route marker. Even numbered routes are east–west roads that increase by multiples of four from south to north with the exceptions of CR 70 and CR 86, while odd numbered routes are north–south roads that increase by multiples of four from west to east. No county routes enter the city of Binghamton and only a few enter incorporated villages.

== Routes 1–100 ==
Route	Length (mi)	Length (km)	From	Via	To	Notes
CR 4	0.73	1.17	CR 249	Sherman Creek Road in Sanford	Delaware County line	
CR 5	3.80	6.12	Underwood Road	Tracy Creek Road in Vestal	Owego Road	Right-of-way south of Underwood Road continues as Collins Road (town-maintained)
CR 8	3.59	5.78	CR 125 in Binghamton	Brady Hill Road	CR 20 / CR 141 in Conklin	
CR 9	1.75	2.82	Tioga County line	Greenwood Road in Nanticoke	CR 21	
CR 13	3.38	5.44	NY 26	Nanticoke Drive in Union	NY 26	
CR 16	2.18	3.51	Piper Hill Road	Edson Road in Windsor	NY 79	
CR 20	4.08	6.57	CR 8 / CR 141 in Conklin	Conklin Forks and Cedarhurst roads	I-81 exit 1 in Conklin	
CR 20S	0.18	0.29	CR 20	Ramp in Kirkwood	US 11	
CR 21	12.14	19.54	NY 26 in Maine	Nanticoke Road and Caldwell Hill roads	NY 79 in Lisle	
CR 24	0.30	0.48	CR 20	Bridge Street in Kirkwood	CR 209	
CR 24S	0.19	0.31	CR 24	Bridge Street Spur in Kirkwood	Susquehanna Road	
CR 25	0.94	1.51	NY 79	Church and Hunts Corners roads in Lisle	Jennings Road	
CR 28	17.68	28.45	CR 217 in Windsor	Old Route 17	Delaware County line in Deposit	Former routing of NY 17
CR 29	2.31	3.72	Country Club Road	Taft Avenue in Union	CR 76	
CR 32	9.73	15.66	US 11 in Kirkwood	Trim and Kent streets	Windsor village line in Windsor	
CR 33	2.52	4.06	NY 17C	Hooper Road in Union	CR 29	
CR 33S	0.22	0.35	NY 17C	Two interchange ramps in Union	CR 33	
CR 36	0.69	1.11	Westview Drive	Castle Gardens Road in Vestal	NY 434	Part of former NY 17 alignment, now town maintained
CR 37	3.59	5.78	CR 148	Killawog Hill and River roads in Lisle	Cortland County line (becomes CR 134B)	
CR 40	0.74	1.19	CR 173	Shaw Road in Conklin	NY 7	
CR 44	5.65	9.09	Bridge Street	Old Vestal Road in Vestal	NY 434	Former routing of NY 17
CR 44S	0.16	0.26	Dead end	Old Vestal Lane in Vestal	CR 44	
CR 45	7.81	12.57	CR 69 / CR 72 in Union	East Maine Road	NY 26 in Maine	
CR 48	0.14	0.23	South bridge abutment in Vestal	Vestal Avenue and Bridge Street	North bridge abutment in Union	
CR 49 (1)	5.18	8.34	CR 33 in Union	Farm To Market Road	CR 45 in Maine	
CR 49 (2)	0.27	0.43	CR 49 (segment 1)	Oak Tree Lane	CR 49 (segment 1)	
CR 52	13.39	21.55	US 11 in Kirkwood	Colesville Road	NY 79 in Colesville	
CR 53	5.16	8.30	NY 26	Bunn Hill Road in Vestal	CR 44	
CR 56	2.08	3.35	CR 33	Watson Boulevard in Union	Johnson City village line	
CR 57	5.65	9.09	NY 26 in Vestal	Powderhouse Road	Binghamton city line in Binghamton	
CR 60	2.29	3.69	Tioga County line (becomes CR 14)	Day Hollow Road in Union	NY 26	
CR 61	1.10	1.77	Whitney Point village line in Triangle	Whitney Point–Lisle Road	Lisle village line in Lisle	
CR 64	4.91	7.90	CR 52 in Colesville	Ouaquaga Road	NY 79 in Colesville	
CR 65	2.46	3.96	Johnson City village line in Union	Oakdale Road	CR 45 in Maine	
CR 68	8.13	13.08	Port Dickinson village line in Dickinson	Old State Road	CR 217 in Colesville	
CR 69 (1)	8.05	12.96	CR 113 in Dickinson	Airport Road	Binghamton Regional Airport in Maine	
CR 69 (2)	0.09	0.14	CR 69 (segment 1)	Cemetery Road in Maine	CR 69 (segment 1)	
CR 70	0.45	0.72	Broome County Sheriff's Office	Lt. Van Winkle Drive in Dickinson	US 11	
CR 70S	0.04	0.06	CR 70	Lt Van Winkle Drive Spur in Dickinson	South College Drive	
CR 72	2.62	4.22	CR 45 / CR 69 in Union	Lewis and Smith Hill roads	US 11 in Chenango	
CR 73	1.32	2.12	CR 69	Knapp Road in Maine	Flint Road	
CR 75	0.14	0.23	BAGSAI Softball Complex	Cutler Pond Road in Dickinson	CR 70	
CR 76	2.05	3.30	CR 13	Twist Run Road in Union	CR 49	
CR 77	0.80	1.29	US 11	Keibel Road in Triangle	County Park	
CR 80	3.06	4.92	CR 129	Nowlan Road in Fenton	CR 185	
CR 84	0.40	0.64	NY 38B in Maine	Maple Drive	NY 26 in Union	
CR 85	0.53	0.85	Johnson City village line	Reynolds Road in Union	CR 45	
CR 86	2.40	3.86	NY 38B	Newark Valley Road in Maine	NY 38B	
CR 89	2.08	3.35	CR 69	Upper Stella–Ireland Road in Maine	CR 104 at Chenango town line	
CR 92	0.62	1.00	Harrington Road	Avery Road in Maine	Fredericks Road	
CR 93	1.36	2.19	Cul-de-sac in Dickinson	Lower Stella–Ireland Road	CR 45 in Union	
CR 93S	0.05	0.08	CR 93	Airport Road Spur in Dickinson	CR 69	
CR 96	5.25	8.45	CR 153	River Road in Chenango	NY 12	
CR 97	1.09	1.75	CR 72	Middle Stella–Ireland Road in Union	CR 69	
CR 100	0.66	1.06	CR 153	Hospital Hill Road in Chenango	Dead end	Town maintained

== Routes 101–200 ==
Route	Length (mi)	Length (km)	From	Via	To	Notes
CR 101	6.83	10.99	US 11 / CR 132 in Chenango	Hyde Street	Pease Hill Road in Barker	
CR 104	3.57	5.75	CR 89 at Maine town line	West Chenango Road in Chenango	US 11	
CR 105	3.02	4.86	CR 104	Brooks Road in Chenango	US 11	
CR 108	1.71	2.75	CR 153	Airport Road in Chenango	CR 96	
CR 109	0.43	0.69	Pennsylvania state line	Quaker Lake Road in Binghamton	CR 117	
CR 112	1.72	2.77	CR 45	Commercial Drive in Maine	CR 89	
CR 113	3.00	4.83	Binghamton city line in Dickinson	Downs Avenue, Prospect Street, and Glenwood Road	CR 72 in Chenango	Discontinuous at Binghamton city limits
CR 116	0.42	0.68	CR 45	Arbutus Road in Maine	CR 69	
CR 117	7.45	11.99	Pennsylvania state line in Vestal	Hawleyton Road	Binghamton city line in Binghamton	Includes spur to PA 167 (Silver Lake Road)
CR 120	1.64	2.64	NY 369	Ganoungtown Road in Fenton	CR 193	
CR 121	3.76	6.05	CR 117	Park Avenue in Binghamton	Binghamton city line	
CR 124	4.10	6.60	NY 369 in Fenton	Beartown Road	CR 221 in Colesville	
CR 125	3.35	5.39	CR 117 in Binghamton	Saddlemire Road	CR 141 in Conklin	
CR 128	3.95	6.36	US 11 in Barker	Knapp Hill Road	NY 12 in Chenango	
CR 129	1.27	2.04	Port Dickinson village line	Chenango Street in Fenton	I-88 / NY 7 east service road near exit 2	Former routing of NY 7
CR 132	5.80	9.33	NY 26 in Maine	Dunham Hill Road	US 11 / CR 101 in Chenango	
CR 133	4.32	6.95	NY 79 in Barker	South Street	NY 206 in Triangle	
CR 136	3.44	5.54	CR 21	Cherry Valley Hill Road in Nanticoke	NY 26	
CR 137	4.40	7.08	NY 206	North Street in Triangle	Witty Hill and Round Pond roads	
CR 140	2.55	4.10	CR 133	Cloverdale Road in Barker	Chenango County line (becomes CR 1)	
CR 141	5.70	9.17	CR 8 / CR 20 in Conklin	Pierce Creek Road	Binghamton city line in Binghamton	
CR 144	5.41	8.71	NY 26	Page Brook Road in Triangle	Witty Hill and Hemlock Hill roads	
CR 145	2.14	3.44	Binghamton city line in Dickinson	Bevier Street	CR 68 in Kirkwood	
CR 148	2.71	4.36	NY 79	Owen Hill Road in Lisle	Lisle village line	
CR 149	1.60	2.57	CR 140	Pixley Road in Barker	CR 133	
CR 152	1.75	2.82	Cortland County line (becomes CR 161C)	Upper Lisle Road in Triangle	NY 26	
CR 153	2.42	3.89	NY 12A	Kattelville Road in Chenango	CR 96	
CR 156	3.02	4.86	Cortland County line (becomes CR 136)	Jennings Creek Road in Lisle	US 11	
CR 156S	0.15	0.24	Dead end	Jennings Creek Road Spur in Lisle	CR 156	
CR 157	2.88	4.63	CR 20 in Conklin	Murphy Road	CR 141 in Binghamton	
CR 158	0.41	0.66	NY 12	Fallon Road in Chenango	CR 251	
CR 161	5.41	8.71	NY 7 in Conklin	Powers Road	Binghamton city line in Binghamton	
CR 165	2.50	4.02	CR 80	Crocker Hill Road in Fenton	NY 7B	
CR 169	2.33	3.75	US 11	Loughlin Road in Kirkwood	CR 68	
CR 173	1.01	1.63	CR 40	Terrace Drive in Conklin	NY 7	
CR 177	0.78	1.26	NY 7 in Conklin	Colesville Road Extension	CR 52 in Kirkwood	
CR 181	1.83	2.95	CR 52	Industrial Park Drive in Kirkwood	End of loop road	
CR 181S	0.11	0.18	CR 52	Industrial Park Drive Spur in Kirkwood	CR 181	
CR 185	3.57	5.75	CR 52 in Kirkwood	Stratmill Road	CR 80 in Fenton	
CR 189	1.29	2.08	CR 161	Hardie Road in Conklin	CR 40	
CR 193	4.36	7.02	NY 369	Ballyhack Road in Fenton	CR 120	
CR 197	2.15	3.46	NY 7 / CR 20	Broome Corporate Parkway in Conklin	CR 161	

== Routes 201 and up ==
Route	Length (mi)	Length (km)	From	Via	To	Notes
CR 205	0.16	0.26	NY 79	Stillwater Road in Fenton	Chenango County line (becomes CR 32)	
CR 209	1.92	3.09	US 11	Main Street in Kirkwood	US 11	
CR 217 (1)	5.12	8.24	CR 28 in Colesville	North and Sanitaria Springs roads	CR 217 (segment 2) in Colesville	
CR 217 (2)	0.37	0.60	NY 7B	Circle Drive	NY 7	
CR 221	4.85	7.81	NY 7 in Colesville	Tunnel Road	NY 79 in Colesville	
CR 225	4.48	7.21	Pennsylvania state line	State Line Road in Windsor	CR 28	
CR 229 (1)	1.73	2.78	CR 233	Center Village Loop Road in Colesville	CR 233	
CR 229 (2)	0.20	0.32	NY 79	Bridge Street in Colesville	CR 229 (segment 1)	
CR 229 (3)	0.19	0.31	NY 79	Old Bridge Street in Colesville	CR 229 (segment 1)	
CR 233	9.49	15.27	Windsor village line in Windsor	East Windsor Road	Chenango County line in Colesville (becomes CR 26)	
CR 233S	0.15	0.24	NY 7	East Windsor Road Spur in Colesville	CR 233	
CR 237	6.69	10.77	CR 28	Oquaga Lake Road in Sanford	Deposit village line	
CR 241 (1)	7.86	12.65	NY 41	North Sanford Road in Sanford	Chenango County line	
CR 241 (2)	0.04	0.06	CR 241 (segment 1)	North Sanford Road Spur in Sanford	Delaware County line (becomes CR 20)	
CR 245 (1)	2.70	4.35	Deposit village line	Big Hollow and Lumber roads in Sanford	0.12 miles (0.19 km) east of Big Hollow Road	
CR 245 (2)	0.69	1.11	CR 245 (segment 1)	Old Big Hollow Road in Sanford	CR 245 (segment 1)	
CR 249	4.40	7.08	Pennsylvania state line	River Road in Sanford	CR 237	
CR 250	0.20	0.32	CR 73	Shea Drive in Maine	Dawes Drive	Bypasses Greater Binghamton Airport parking area to access Dawes Drive.
CR 251	0.09	0.14	CR 158	Stone Road in Chenango	Broad Street	
CR 253	0.38	0.61	CR 197	Darden Way in Conklin	Darden Direct Distribution	

== Notes ==
1. Some county route numbers are skipped due to decommissioning or other reasons; for example, there is no CR 12 or CR 88.

== See also ==
- County routes in New York
