= New York State Route 9 =

New York State Route 9 may refer to:

- New York State Route 9 (1924–1927) in the Southern Tier and Capital District
- U.S. Route 9 in New York, the only route numbered "9" in New York since 1927
