= Fenton, New York =

- Town
- Seal

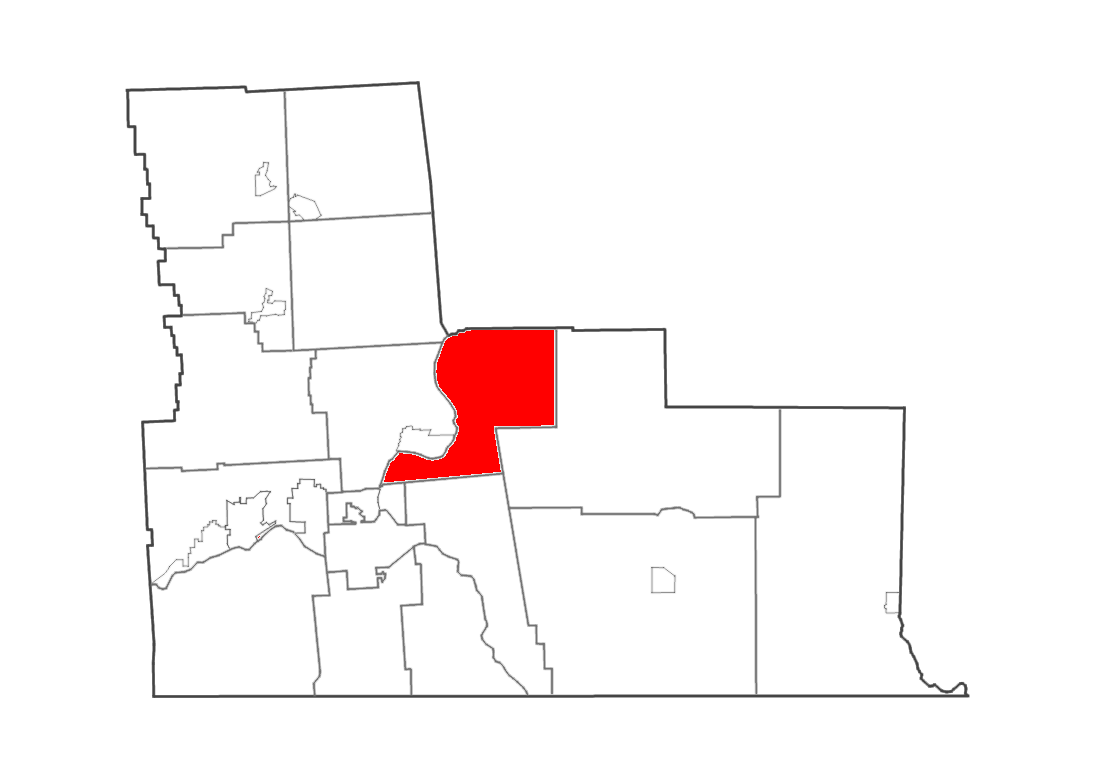
- Location within Broome County

- Location within New York Location within the United States
- Coordinates: 42°11′1″N 75°49′29″W
- Country: United States
- State: New York
- County: Broome

Government
  - Type: Town Council
  - Town Supervisor: David C. Hamlin
  - Town Council: Members' List: • Michael Husar; • Gary Holcomb; • Jeffrey P. Kraham; • Rick Pray

Area
  - Total: 33.37 sq mi (86.42 km^{2})
  - Land: 32.78 sq mi (84.89 km^{2})
  - Water: 0.59 sq mi (1.53 km^{2})
- Elevation: 1,371 ft (418 m)

Population (2020)
  - Total: 6,441 ▼
  - Estimate (2021): 6,364
  - Density: 196.7/sq mi (75.94/km^{2})
- Time zone: UTC-5 (Eastern (EST))
  - Summer (DST): UTC-4 (EDT)
- ZIP Codes: 13833 (Port Crane); 13746 (Chenango Forks); 13901, 13904 (Binghamton)
- Area code: 607
- FIPS code: 36-25604
- GNIS feature ID: 978956
- Website: www.townoffentonny.gov

Fenton is a town in Broome County, New York, United States. The population was 6,441 at the 2020 census. The town was named after Reuben Fenton, a governor of New York.

The town is in the northeastern part of the county and is northeast of Binghamton.

== History ==
The area was first settled around 1788. The town of Port Crane was formed from the town of Chenango in 1855. The larger town of Fenton was established in 1867. Port Crane has remained as a hamlet within the town of Fenton.

The former Chenango Canal (1834–1876) passed through the west side of the town, following the Chenango River. The town developed and prospered with the advent of the canal. While the canal was supplanted by the railroads, the town was bypassed by the trains. When the canal was gone, the prosperity in Port Crane left with it.

== Geography ==
According to the United States Census Bureau, the town has a total area of 33.4 square miles (86.4 km^{2}), of which 32.8 square miles (84.9 km^{2}) is land and 0.58 square miles (1.5 km^{2}), or 1.77%, is water.

The north town line is the border of Chenango County, and the west town line is marked by the Chenango River.

Interstate 88 crosses the southern part of the town, with access from Exits 2 and 3. New York State Route 7 parallels the interstate. New York State Route 369 is a north–south highway in the town and intersects New York State Route 79 at North Fenton.

=== Adjacent towns and areas ===
To the east is the town of Colesville, to the west is the town of Chenango, and to the northwest is the town of Barker. The towns of Kirkwood and Dickinson are on the south side. The town of Greene in Chenango County borders Fenton to the north.

== Demographics ==
Historical population
| Census | Pop. | Note | %± |
|---|---|---|---|
| 1870 | 1,499 | | — |
| 1880 | 1,555 | | 3.7% |
| 1890 | 1,280 | | −17.7% |
| 1900 | 1,171 | | −8.5% |
| 1910 | 1,050 | | −10.3% |
| 1920 | 1,111 | | 5.8% |
| 1930 | 2,003 | | 80.3% |
| 1940 | 2,732 | | 36.4% |
| 1950 | 4,168 | | 52.6% |
| 1960 | 5,920 | | 42.0% |
| 1970 | 6,719 | | 13.5% |
| 1980 | 7,400 | | 10.1% |
| 1990 | 7,236 | | −2.2% |
| 2000 | 6,909 | | −4.5% |
| 2010 | 6,674 | | −3.4% |
| 2020 | 6,441 | | −3.5% |
| 2021 (est.) | 6,364 | | −1.2% |
U.S. Decennial Census

As of the census of 2000, there were 6,909 people, 2,763 households, and 1,947 families residing in the town. The population density was 210.1 inhabitants per square mile (81.1/km^{2}). There were 2,941 housing units at an average density of 89.4 per square mile (34.5/km^{2}). The racial makeup of the town was 97.52% White, 0.87% African American, 0.30% Native American, 0.25% Asian, 0.19% from other races, and 0.87% from two or more races. Hispanic or Latino of any race were 0.80% of the population.

There were 2,763 households, out of which 30.0% had children under the age of 18 living with them, 57.7% were married couples living together, 8.6% had a female householder with no husband present, and 29.5% were non-families. 24.6% of all households were made up of individuals, and 10.4% had someone living alone who was 65 years of age or older. The average household size was 2.47 and the average family size was 2.93.

In the town, the population was spread out, with 25.1% under the age of 18, 5.9% from 18 to 24, 26.5% from 25 to 44, 26.5% from 45 to 64, and 16.1% who were 65 years of age or older. The median age was 41 years. For every 100 females, there were 96.6 males. For every 100 females age 18 and over, there were 92.5 males.

The median income for a household in the town was $39,622, and the median income for a family was $45,869. Males had a median income of $37,800 versus $25,875 for females. The per capita income for the town was $19,780. About 4.6% of families and 6.8% of the population were below the poverty line, including 5.9% of those under age 18 and 5.7% of those age 65 or over.

== Communities and other locations in Fenton ==
- Chenango Valley State Park – A state park adjacent to the Chenango River, known for its wooded golf course and scenic glacial topography.
- Chenango Lake – The larger of two scenic wooded lakes in the Chenango Valley State Park, used for swimming and boating.
- Fenton – A location on NY-369 near the state park.
- Hillcrest – A suburban residential community east of the Chenango River neighboring Chenango Bridge and Port Dickinson.
- Lily Lake – The smaller of two lakes, north of Chenango Lake, known for its scenic beauty and good fishing.
- North Fenton – A hamlet at the junction of NY-79 and NY-369 by the north town line. It was originally called "Ketchums Corners."
- Pleasant Hill – A hamlet in the southern part of the town on County Road 193.
- Port Crane – A hamlet near the Chenango River and the southern town line, near the intersection of NY-369, NY-7, and I-88. It was formerly a port on the now-defunct Chenango Canal and was named after Jason Crane, a canal engineer. It remains as a hamlet within the larger town of Fenton.
- Quinneville – A hamlet at the northern town line on NY-79.
- Wyman Corner – A hamlet in the southeastern part of the town.

== Notable person ==
- Billy Martin, baseball legend, second baseman and New York Yankees manager; After retirement he lived on a private lake in a large home near Port Crane N.Y. It had a private suite for Mickey Mantle when he visited. It was on that road, mere feet from his driveway, where his fatal car accident occurred on Christmas Day in 1989.
