= Berkalew Island =

- Location within New York Location within the United States

Geography
- Location: Susquehanna River
- Coordinates: 42°02′27″N 75°48′17″W
- Highest elevation: 840 ft (256 m)

Administration
- United States
- State: New York
- County: Broome
- Town: Kirkwood

Berkalew Island is an island located by Kirkwood, New York, on the Susquehanna River. The upstream end is connected to the right bank by a sand bar.
