= Verdoy, New York =

- Hamlet
- Location within New York Location within the United States
- Coordinates: 42°45′52″N 73°48′14″W
- Country: United States
- State: New York
- Region: Capital District
- County: Albany
- Town: Colonie
- Time zone: UTC-5 (EST)
  - Summer (DST): UTC-4 (EDT)
- ZIP Code: 12110 (Latham)
- Area code: 518

Verdoy, formerly known as Watervliet Center, is a hamlet of the town of Colonie in Albany County, New York, United States. Much of Verdoy is in the Airport Noise Overlay District due to its immediate proximity to Albany International Airport's main north/south runway, which was recently extended by 1,300 feet to the north, moving it even closer to Verdoy. The former Troy & Schenectady Branch of the New York Central Railroad runs along Verdoy's northern border with the Mohawk River; it is now part of the Mohawk Hudson Hike/Bike Trail.

== History ==
Lewis Morris came to the area of present-day Verdoy, then known as Watervliet Center, in 1835; along with being the second postmaster of the post office he built a hotel, store, and several shops. The hamlet was known as Morrisville for some time in his honor.

In the 19th century, Watervliet Center was home to Yearsley's Public House at the corner of Troy-Schenectady Road and Old Niskayuna Road. Elsie Lansing Whipple and Jesse Strang stopped at Yearsley's during a storm just before Strang would murder Whipple's wealthy husband at the Cherry Hill mansion in Albany.

In 1991, the New York State Department of Transportation widened Route 7 to include a 12-foot (3.7 m) center turning lane between St. David's Lane in Niskayuna and Wade Road east of Verdoy. The 6.4-mile (10.3 km) long widening demolished nine homes and two businesses along with taking several vacant properties.

Much of Verdoy's history has been moved to save it from development and the airport noise district. Houses found in the 1970s to be experiencing high noise levels were purchased by the Albany County Airport (today the Albany International Airport) beginning in 1981 and 22 were demolished in 1992. The Buhrmaster barn was originally built in 1760 along the Mohawk River on River View Road, but burned in the late 19th century. It was then reconstructed but the barn retained many of its original features such as the Dutch door, hand-hewn beams and wooden pegs. When the New York State Barge Canal changed the shoreline of the Mohawk River in 1915, the barn was rolled uphill, being pulled by horse and rolled on logs. The barn was moved again in 1988 to the Pruyn House historical site. The Verdoy School was built in 1910 as a one-room schoolhouse and was used up until 1958, when the North Colonie Central School District started using it as a storage building. In 1995, the school district donated the building to the town of Colonie. As part of the town's centennial, the Centennial Commission paid for the school to be transported to the Pruyn House on Old Niskayuna Road in Newtonville for use as a museum.

Due to being in the path of a runway the airport has condemned the airspace above buildings, including the former Verdoy firehouse. In 1998, the airport purchased the Verdoy Volunteer Fire Department's firehouse on Route 7 and rented it back to the department for $1.00 a year. The station, at 8,000 square feet (740 m^{2}) became too small for a new ladder truck the department needed for newer and taller buildings there were being built in the district such as the airport control tower and the Hilton hotel; in 2000, the fire department moved to its current location further up the road with a 21,500 square feet (2,000 m^{2}) building.

== Geography ==
While Colonie's hamlets do not have specifically demarcated borders, Verdoy is generally considered to include the areas along New York State Route 7, west of the Colonie hamlet of Latham and between Albany International Airport and the Mohawk River.

== Services ==
The hamlet and surrounding areas, including the Albany International Airport is served by the Verdoy Volunteer Fire Department. The department serves approximately 7,500 residents (in 2000) and covers 7.5 miles (12.1 km) of the town of Colonie.
