= Albany International Airport =

Airport outside of Albany, New York

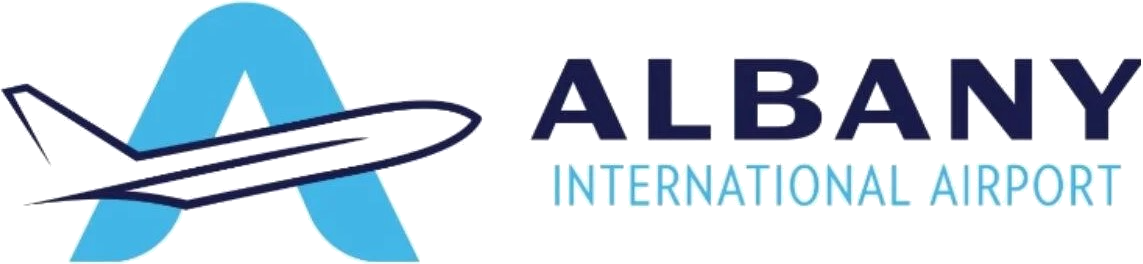

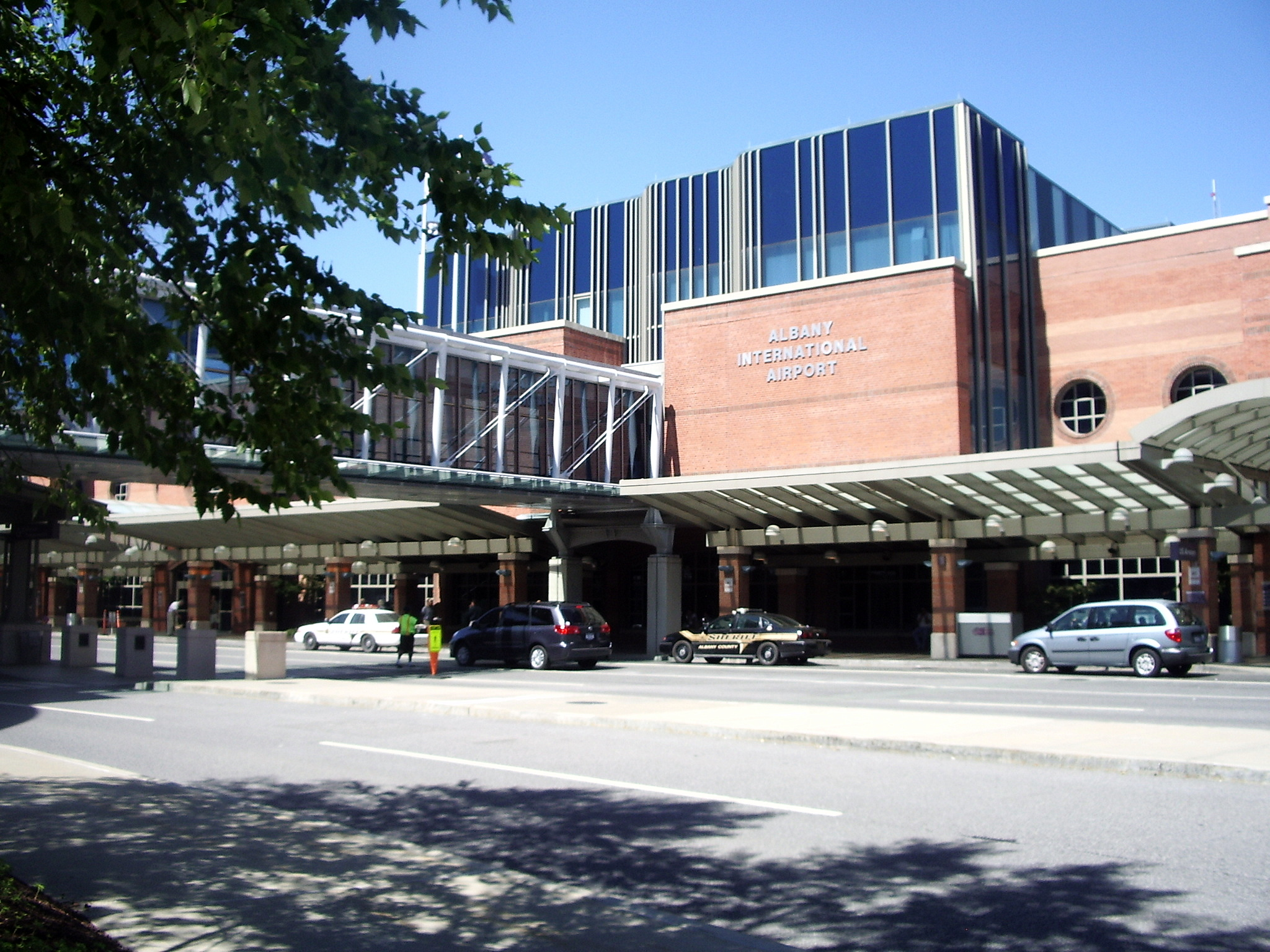
- IATA: ALB; ICAO: KALB; FAA LID: ALB

Summary
- Airport type: Public
- Owner: Albany County, New York
- Operator: Albany County Airport Authority
- Serves: Capital District; Mohawk Valley; Upper Hudson Valley; Southern Adirondacks; Catskills; Western New England
- Location: Colonie, New York, U.S.
- Elevation AMSL: 285 ft (87 m)
- Coordinates: 42°44′57″N 073°48′07″W
- Website: www.albanyairport.com

Maps
- FAA airport diagram
- Interactive map of Albany International Airport

Runways
Direction	Length		Surface
Direction	ft	m	Surface
01/19	8,500	2,591	Asphalt
10/28	7,200	2,195	Asphalt

Statistics (2025)
- Aircraft operations: 64,383
- Total passengers: 3,143,000
- Source: Federal Aviation Administration,

Albany International Airport (IATA: ALB, ICAO: KALB, FAA LID: ALB) is six miles (9.7 km) northwest of Albany, in Albany County, New York, United States. It is owned by the Albany County Airport Authority. ALB covers 1,000 acres (400 ha) of land.

It is an airport of entry in the town of Colonie. It was built on the site of the Shaker settlement about 6 miles (9.7 km) north of Albany and stretching north to the hamlet of Verdoy. It is also located in close proximity to Interstate 87, State Route 155, and State Route 7. The airport is considered Class Charlie Airspace.

Albany International Airport serves as the major air center for the Capital Region, Northeastern New York, and Western New England. In 2025, the airport handled just under 1.6 million departing passengers, breaking the record of 1.56 million in 2004. Many airlines serve the airport, with Southwest Airlines having the most presence. It holds approximately one-third of the total airline share at Albany. Along with Southwest Airlines, Albany sees service with many other low-cost carriers, including JetBlue Airways, Allegiant Airlines, and Avelo Airlines. The airport is the fourth largest in New York State.

== History ==
Albany International was the first and remains the oldest, municipal airport in the United States. In 1908 the airstrip was on a former polo field on Loudonville Road, 3 miles (4.8 km) north of the city in the town of Colonie. In 1909 the airport moved to Westerlo Island, in the city of Albany, but at that time was in the town of Bethlehem; the airport was named at this time. The airport was named after Teddy Roosevelt's son, Quentin, a fighter pilot during World War I who perished while in air combat. A $10,000 prize was established for sustained flight between Albany and New York City; Glenn Curtiss achieved this on May 29, 1910. Other early pioneers of aviation that stopped at this early field were Charles Lindbergh, Amelia Earhart, and James Doolittle.

Mayor John Boyd Thacher II once said "a city without the foresight to build an airport for the new traffic may soon be left behind in the race for competition". He, therefore, decided to build in 1928 a new modern airport on the Shaker site near Albany-Shaker Road in Colonie, not far from the original polo fields used as the first site of the municipal airport. The Shakers not only sold the land used but also loaned the use of tractors and tools.

The early Albany Airport was often closed and threatened with a closure that prompted repeated improvements in the late 1930s and 1940s. The airport was closed from January 1939 until December 1940, when it reopened to traffic during daylight hours only, and then with no restrictions since January 1942. The airport has not been closed (other than for weather and emergency landings) since.

The February 1947 C&GS chart shows three 3,500-foot (1,100-meter) runways aimed at 12, 98, and 133 degrees magnetic. By 1950, the primary runway was up to 5,000 feet (1,500 meters) in length and was hard-surfaced. In 1966 and 1967, the north–south runway was extended to 6,000 feet (1,800 m). In the 1980s, the main runway was extended again to the north to 7,200 feet (2,200 m). The east/west crosswind runway was also extended eastward to 7,200 feet (2,200 m) from 5,999 feet (1,828 m) in the early 2000s, but the landing threshold was maintained, thus the available landing distance was unchanged because of obstructions to the east, but the full length was available for takeoffs to the west. A few years later, another 1,300 feet (400 m) of the runway was added to the north end of the main runway to bring it to its 8,500 foot (2,600 m) length. The north–south runway gained runway centerline lighting and the north-facing runway added touchdown zone lighting to lower landing minimums – including a category two instrument landing system approach.

ALB was jointly owned and managed by the city and county of Albany until 1960 when Mayor Erastus Corning 2nd ended the city's stake.

In 1962 a new terminal building opened. A landside building had ticket counters, a coffee shop, and baggage claim on the first floor and a restaurant, offices and viewing area on the second floor. A single-story boarding concourse extended outwards from this building. In 1968 this concourse was widened to allow more concessions and boarding space. The terminal was expanded again in 1979, with the addition of a new two-story building attached diagonally to the northwest. It had boarding gates for Allegheny Airlines on the second floor and baggage carousels on the first floor.

The Albany County Airport Authority was created by the county in 1993 with a 40-year lease to operate the airport in 1996. Construction of a new terminal began on May 16, 1996; it opened in June 1998. It was designed by Reynolds, Smith & Hills and Stracher-Roth-Gilmore, and it was built around the existing terminal, most of which was demolished upon its completion. Only the 1979 extension remains from the old terminal building.

In 1999 the Airport Authority began building a 16,000-square-foot (1,500 m^{2}) addition to the new terminal for Southwest Airlines' use. The project was completed in 2000 and included the addition of two new dual jet bridges allowing passengers to board and deplane from front and rear doors of the aircraft.

Construction started in 2019 for various airport improvements. This includes a new 1,000 car parking garage, which will open in March 2020; new solar panels, escalators, energy efficient taxiway lighting, concessions are also being installed. In addition, some passenger jet bridges are being replaced.

Frontier Airlines permanently left ALB in late 2022 due to their own budget cuts, leaving several areas with no tenants, however in 2025, Breeze Airways is replacing Frontier.

== Future ==
In September 2022, the upgrades were finished and the airport secured a large amount of funding to begin a new project. This project would extend the bridge that goes from the north garage to the main terminal, adding a new feel to walking through or driving under it. It will make space for concessions and retail to appear in those spaces. The project will also improve passenger flow for the airport, and will improve the inside of the airport overall. The project broke ground in December 2023, and is expected to be completed in mid-2025.

== Service history ==
Between 1946 and 1961, American Airlines, TWA and Colonial/Eastern flew to Albany, but nonstop flights did not travel farther than New York City and Buffalo until 1967. Eastern left in 1961 and TWA left in 1965, leaving Mohawk and a few American flights. The first jets were American and Mohawk British Aircraft Corporation BAC One-Elevens in late 1966; concurrently, runway 1/19 was extended south sometime in 1966–67, from 5,000–6,000 feet (1,500–1,800 m).

Before airline deregulation in 1978, most flights at Albany were on "trunk carriers" (American Airlines and Eastern Air Lines) and "local service carrier" (Allegheny Airlines, which renamed itself USAir in 1979). After deregulation, many new airlines expanded to Albany. Most did not survive the 1980s.

Airlines at Albany after deregulation include:

- Air Vermont, which offered service to Boston, Burlington, Worcester and Hartford in the early 1980s.
- Braniff International Airways, which added Albany as part of an unsuccessful expansion in 1979. Albany was the only Upstate New York city served by the colorful Dallas-based airline that shut down in 1982.
- Empire Airlines, a regional carrier based in Utica, opened a hub at Syracuse Hancock International Airport after deregulation and operated flights from Albany and other Northeast cities with a fleet of regional jets and turboprops.
- Mall Airways, a commuter carrier, ran a hub at Albany in the 1980s; its small turboprops flew around the Northeast and into Canada.
- People Express Airlines, a low-cost carrier founded in 1981 with a hub at Newark International Airport. People grew quickly into a major carrier, but couldn't maintain it and was purchased by Continental Airlines in 1986. Continental's Continental Express and Continental Connection affiliates served Albany until the merger with United in 2010.
- Piedmont Airlines, a pre-deregulation local service carrier based in North Carolina, expanded to the Northeast with a hub at Baltimore–Washington International Airport; they flew to Albany from there. They bought Empire in 1985 and merged them into itself. In 1989 Piedmont was bought by USAir.
- Republic Airlines, an airline formed from the merger of three pre-deregulation local service carriers, began flying from Albany to their Detroit hub in 1984. They were bought by Northwest Airlines in 1987; Delta Air Lines bought Northwest in 2008 and took over their operations in 2009.
- TWA (Trans World Airlines) served Albany briefly around 1979–1981 during a short-lived experiment running a hub in Pittsburgh.
- United Airlines had long served Rochester and Buffalo, and added Albany and Syracuse in 1982. United and its affiliates serve Albany today.

During 1986–1987, the airline industry saw a series of mergers; after 1989, the US airline industry was dominated by six "legacy carriers": American, United, Delta, Northwest, USAir, and Continental. All six served Albany themselves or by their regional affiliates. During the 1990s, Albany and other Upstate markets enjoyed little low-fare service, and the legacy carriers mostly kept fares high. Southwest Airlines' entry into Albany in 2000 brought a new era of low fare service.

== CommutAir hub ==
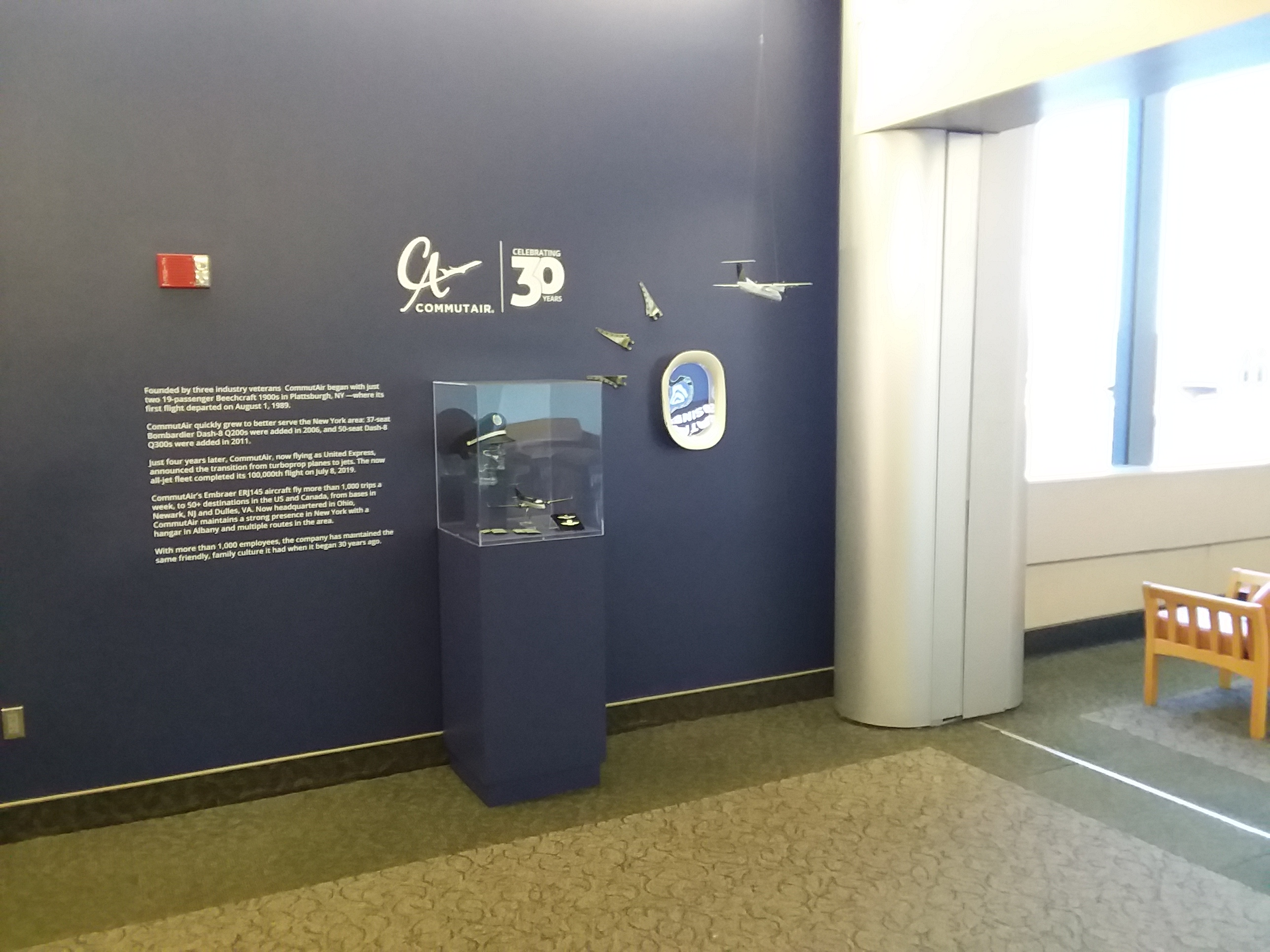
Display in Concourse A commemorating CommutAir's 30th anniversary

In early 2001, CommutAir (now CommuteAir) started to invest in an Albany hub. The hub was to connect a number of smaller cities in the Northeastern United States via the Albany hub. This allowed passengers to travel between cities that lack the demand for a direct flight between them while still bypassing busy, delay-prone hubs in major cities. These flights were operated under the Continental Connection brand using Beechcraft 1900Ds. The flights were scheduled in banks so that passengers would only have a 20-minute layover in Albany between flights, thereby minimizing travel times.

At its peak, CommutAir served Allentown, Bangor, Binghamton, Boston, Buffalo, Burlington, Elmira, Portland, Harrisburg, Nantucket, Wilkes-Barre, LaGuardia, Islip, Hartford, White Plains, Manchester, Providence, Syracuse, Rochester, Saranac Lake, Plattsburgh, Montréal, Ottawa. The hub was closed down in late 2005 to shift operations to Cleveland. A few of the markets did do well.

As of December 2023, CommuteAir operates several daily flights from Albany to its hub at Dulles International Airport for United Express. CommuteAir also has one of its key maintenance bases at Albany, serving its ERJ-145 fleet. Previously CommuteAir's main maintenance base was located at Cleveland Hopkins International Airport, but CommuteAir moved the maintenance base to Albany in 2014.

== Main terminal and concourses ==
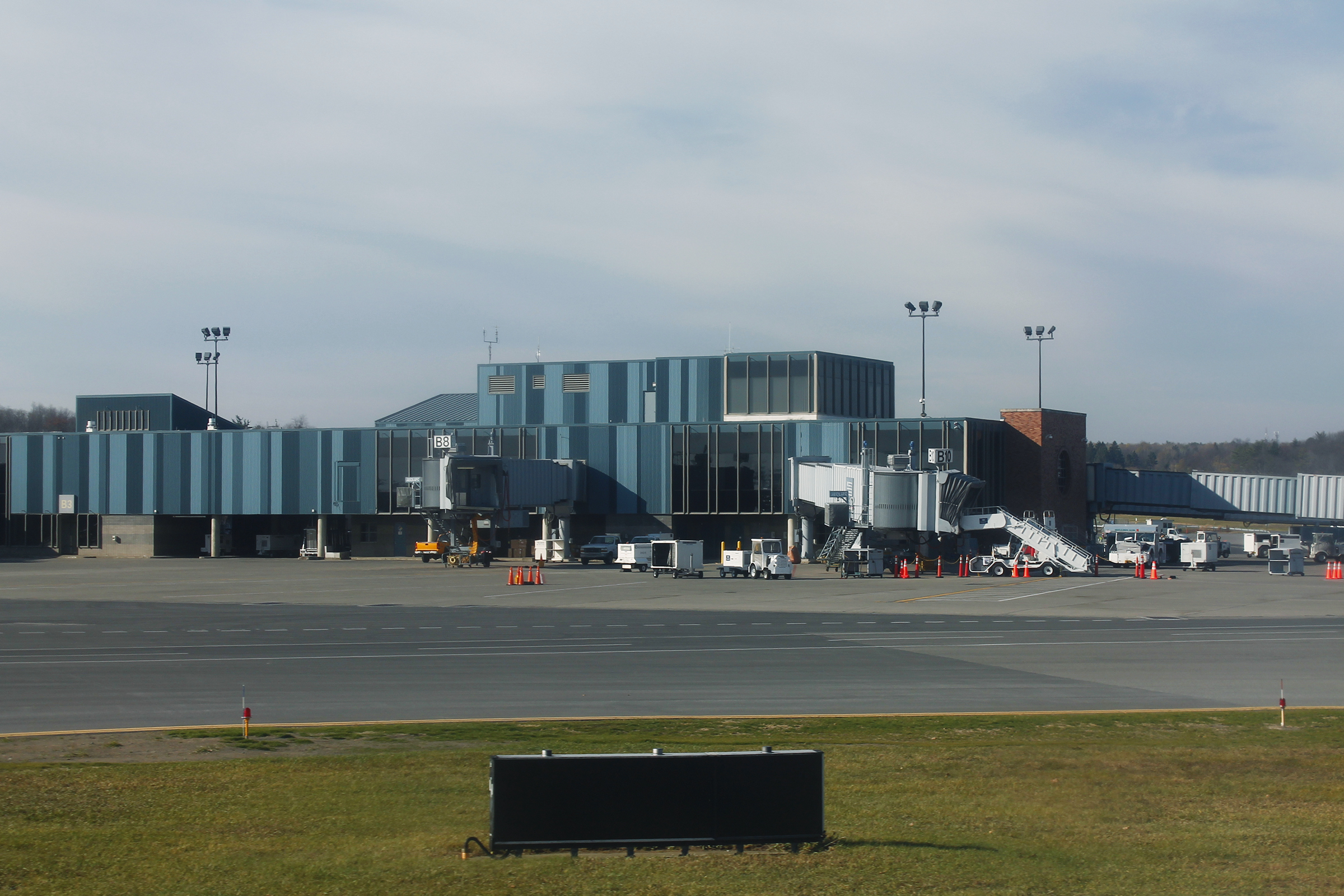
Terminal

=== Main terminal ===
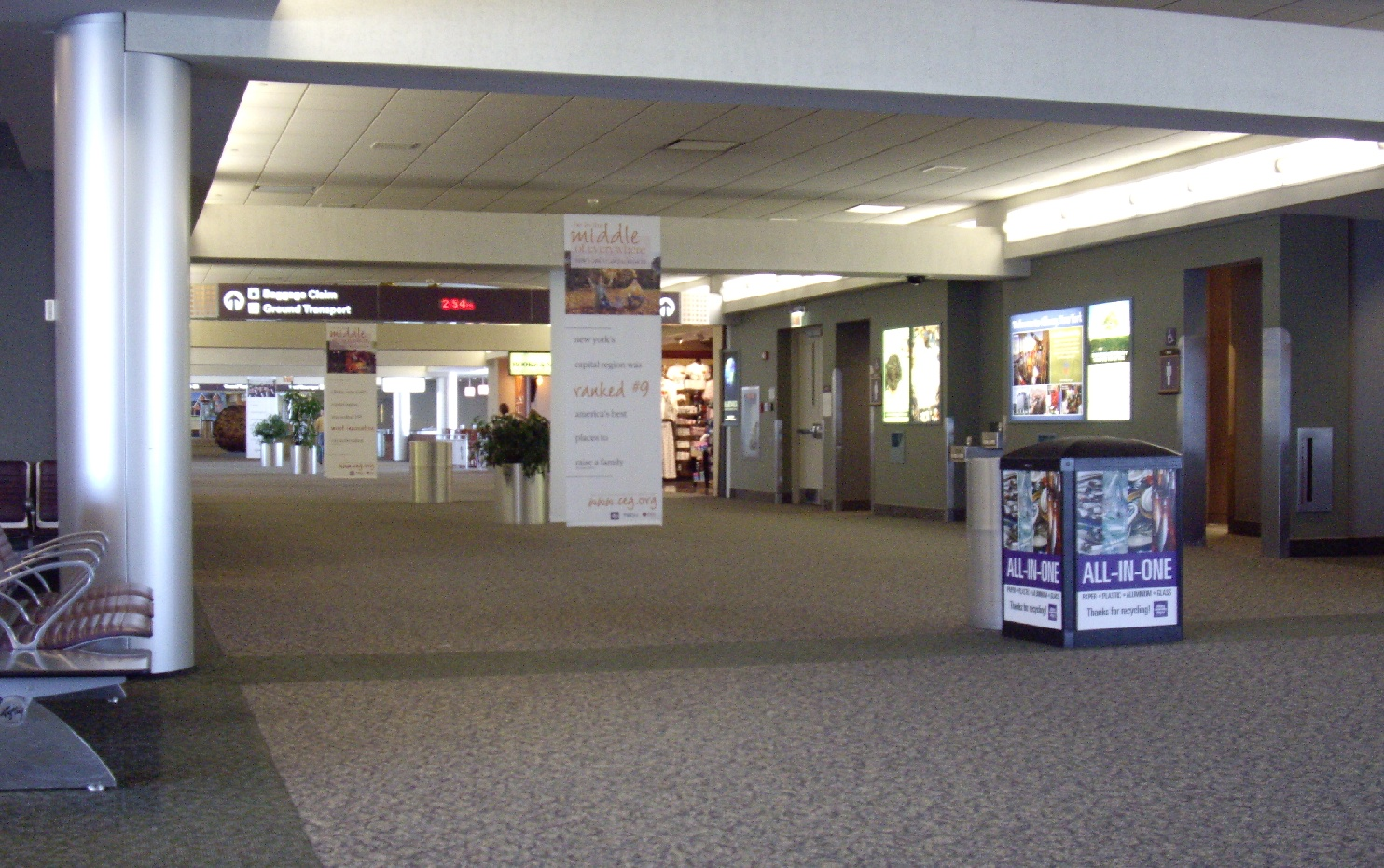
Albany International Airport terminal, June 2011

The main terminal is divided into two levels. Level 1 includes the main check-in area, baggage claim, car rental, and taxi services. Level 2 includes a public waiting area. The security checkpoint leads passengers to a central atrium and all three concourses.

=== Concourses ===
Concourse A was opened in 1998. The concourse currently hosts Allegiant Air and United. Concourse B hosts American, Delta, and JetBlue. Concourse C was opened in June 1998 as part of the airport's $184 million renovation project. Concourse C has three gates, with two currently being used by Southwest, while the other is currently assigned to Breeze Airways after being vacated by Frontier.

== Airlines and destinations ==
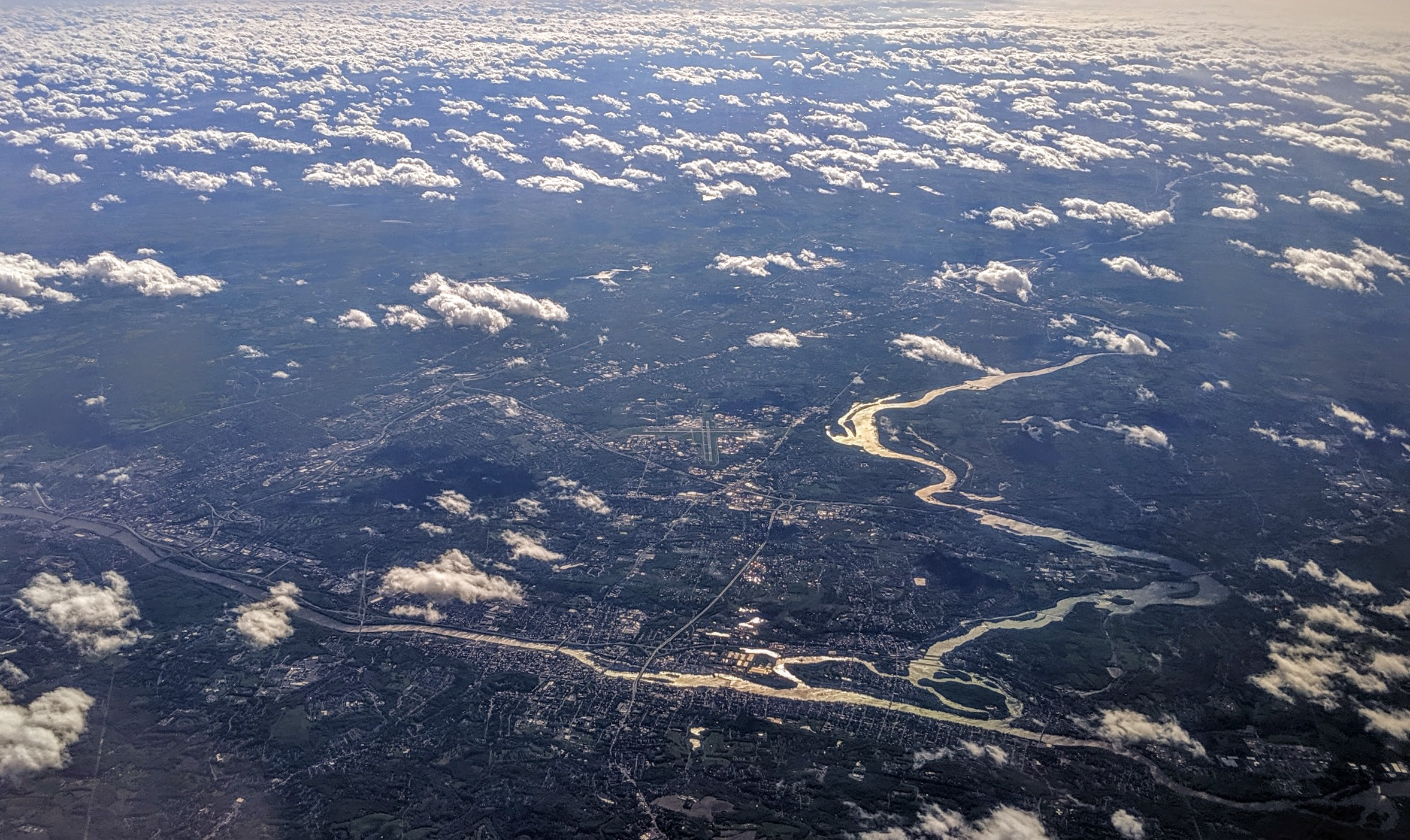
Aerial view of Troy, New York, with Hudson and Mohawk rivers and Albany International Airport

=== Passenger ===
Airlines	Destinations
Allegiant Air	Fort Lauderdale, Myrtle Beach, Orlando/Sanford, Sarasota; Seasonal: Nashville, Punta Gorda, St. Petersburg/Clearwater
American Airlines	Charlotte, Washington–National
American Eagle	Chicago–O'Hare, Philadelphia, Washington–National; Seasonal: Miami
Avelo Airlines	Charlotte/Concord
Breeze Airways	Charleston (SC), Raleigh/Durham, Myrtle Beach (begins May 28, 2027); Seasonal: Fort Myers
Delta Air Lines	Atlanta; Seasonal: Detroit
Delta Connection	Detroit, New York–LaGuardia
JetBlue	Fort Lauderdale, Orlando
Southwest Airlines	Baltimore, Chicago–Midway, Nashville, Orlando; Seasonal: Denver, Fort Lauderdale, Las Vegas, Sarasota, Tampa
United Airlines	Chicago–O'Hare, Denver
United Express	Chicago–O'Hare, Washington–Dulles

=== Cargo ===
Airlines	Destinations	Refs
DHL Aviation	Cincinnati, Wilkes-Barre/Scranton	
FedEx Express	Memphis; Seasonal: Newark	
UPS Airlines	Louisville, Philadelphia, Syracuse; Seasonal: Buffalo, Chicago/Rockford, Providence	

== Statistics ==
=== Top destinations ===
Busiest domestic routes from ALB (January 2025 – December 2025)
Rank	Airport	Passengers	Carriers
1	Baltimore, Maryland	204,880	Southwest
2	Chicago–O'Hare, Illinois	159,630	American, United
3	Orlando, Florida	152,950	JetBlue, Southwest
4	Atlanta, Georgia	134,580	Delta
5	Charlotte, North Carolina	132,020	American
6	Detroit, Michigan	96,430	Delta
7	Chicago–Midway, Illinois	76,400	Southwest
8	Fort Lauderdale, Florida	72,580	JetBlue, Southwest
9	Washington–National, Virginia	64,220	American
10	Washington–Dulles, Virginia	62,060	United

=== Airline market share ===
Largest airlines at ALB (January 2025 – December 2025)
Rank	Airline	Passengers	Share
1	Southwest Airlines	1,038,000	33.04%
2	Delta Air Lines	330,000	10.52%
3	American Airlines	310,000	9.86%
4	JetBlue	273,000	8.68%
5	Allegiant Air	202,000	6.42%
—	Other	989,000	31.48%

== Ground transportation ==
=== Car ===
Albany International Airport has direct access to I-87 and New York State Route 7 via Albany-Shaker Road, a 3.3-mile (5.3 km), four-lane boulevard. On August 14, 2018, New York state officials announced the new I-87 Exit 3 which will provide direct access to Albany International Airport. The airport is served by major car rental companies Hertz, Enterprise, Budget, and National as well as by Uber, Lyft, local taxi and limousine services.

=== Bus ===
Albany International Airport is served by CDTA Routes 117, 155, and 737. Route 737 provides access to Downtown Albany, while Route 117 provides access to Colonie and Guilderland via Colonie Center and Crossgates Mall. Adirondack Trailways and Vermont Translines also provides intercity bus service to and from the airport. You can also pick up a Vermont Translines bus to Vermont and Southern New York.

=== Rail ===
The closest rail station to Albany Airport is Schenectady Amtrak Station in Downtown Schenectady at 10 miles (16 km) from the airport and mainly services western New York and goes east–west. For more rail options, Albany–Rensselaer Amtrak Station is 14 miles (23 km) away and services as the main Amtrak operations center in the Capital Region, they service New York City and Western New York, east–west and north–south.

=== Walking ===
As of October 2020, a new sidewalk spans across Albany Shaker Road from Route 155 to Wolf Road. A pedestrian and bicycle path is also accessible via the new sidewalk at the corner of Albany Shaker Road and Route 155. There is also a small viewing area and park at the corner of Albany Shaker road and the exit 3 ramp off I-87.

== Incidents and accidents ==
On September 16, 1953, American Airlines Flight 723, a Convair 240, was flying Boston-Springfield-Albany-Syracuse-Rochester-Buffalo-Detroit-Chicago when it crashed and caught fire after flying into a series of radio towers in a fog while descending for landing. All 28 occupants on board (25 passengers and three crew) were killed.

On March 3, 1972, Mohawk Airlines Flight 405, a Fairchild Hiller FH-227, crashed into a house in Albany, on approach to Albany County Airport. The crew had difficulty getting the cruise lock to disengage in one of the engines. While the crew attempted to deal with the problem, the aircraft crashed short of the airfield, killing 16 of the 48 people in the aircraft and one person on the ground.

On June 17, 2024, at approximately 8:15 A.M., a Piper PA-31 Navajo carrying one pilot took off from Runway 19 at the Albany International Airport only to crash minutes later next to neighborhood and library property in Colonie, killing the pilot. The plane was headed to Montreal, where the pilot had been returning after a previous landing in Fayetteville, North Carolina. Two members from the Federal Aviation Administration arrived to the scene of the crash along with several police vehicles and EMTs, with members from The National Transportation Safety Board travelling to Albany from Washington, D.C. to investigate.

== See also ==
- New York World War II Army airfields
- History of Albany, New York
