= Conklin Town Hall =

- U.S. National Register of Historic Places
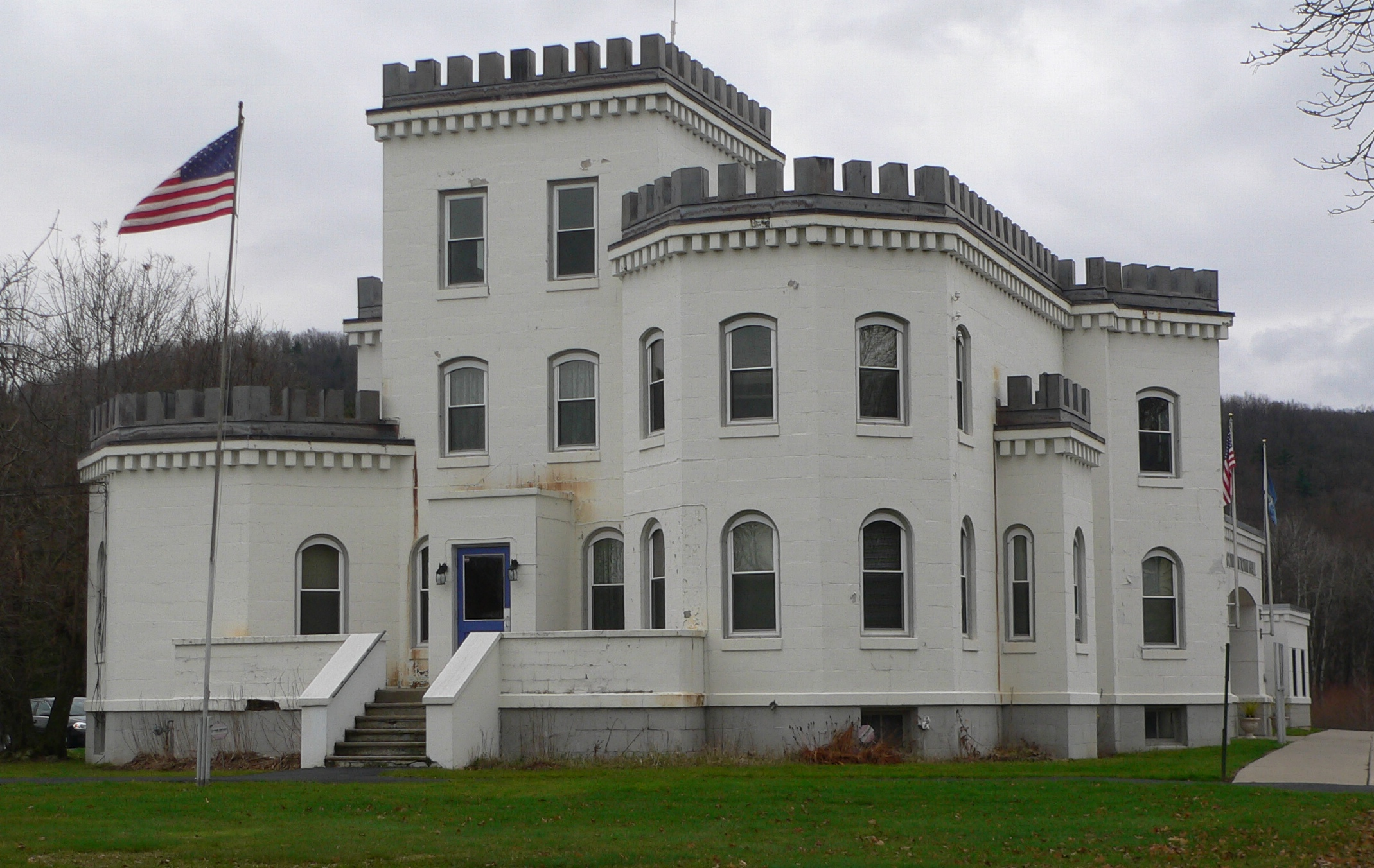
- Conklin Town Hall, November 2011

- Location within New York Location within the United States
- Location: 1271 Conklin Rd., Conklin, New York
- Coordinates: 42°2′58″N 75°48′22″W
- Area: 4.9 acres (2.0 ha)
- Built: 1908
- Architect: Corby, Alpheus
- Architectural style: Late Gothic Revival
- NRHP reference No.: 06001146
- Added to NRHP: December 20, 2006

Conklin Town Hall, also known as Alpheus Corby Residence and The Castle, is a historic town hall located at Conklin in Broome County, New York. It was built in 1908 as a private residence and is a concrete block building, faced with concrete blocks painted to look like stone. The main feature is a three-story square tower. It became the Conklin town hall in 1944.

It was listed on the National Register of Historic Places in 2006.
