= New York State Route 369 =

State highway in Broome County, New York, US

New York State Route 369
- Map of Broome County in the Southern Tier of New York with NY 369 highlighted in red

Route information
- Maintained by NYSDOT
- Length: 6.32 mi (10.17 km)
- Existed: 1930–present

Major junctions
- South end: NY 7B in Port Crane
- I-88 / NY 7 in Port Crane
- North end: NY 79 in North Fenton

Location
- Country: United States
- State: New York
- Counties: Broome

Highway system
- New York Highways; Interstate; US; State; Reference; Parkways
← NY 368	→ NY 370

New York State Route 369 (NY 369) is a state highway located entirely within the town of Fenton in Broome County, New York. It begins at NY 7B south of the concurrency of Interstate 88 and NY 7 in the hamlet of Port Crane and ends at NY 79 in the hamlet of North Fenton.

== Route description ==
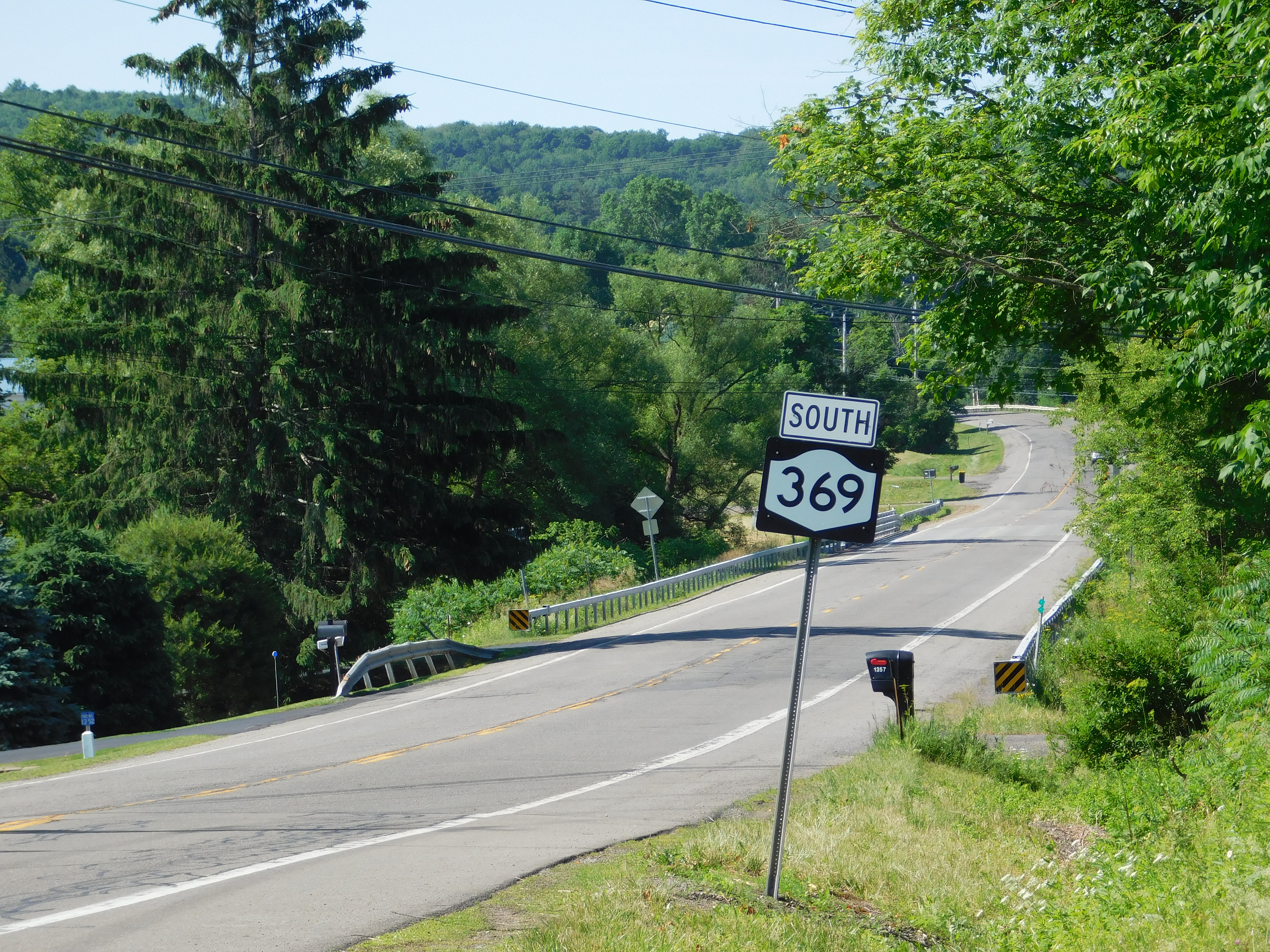
NY 369 in North Fenton from NY 79

NY 369 begins in the Fenton, Broome County hamlet of Port Crane as a northward continuation of NY 7B, which becomes NY 369 upon rounding a curve (the remnants of an intersection between then-NY 7 and NY 369) just southwest of the community. The route heads north into Port Crane, where it intersects half of Interstate 88/NY 7 exit 3 (the ramps leading to and from the eastbound carriageway) at Albany Street. Farther north, access to and from I-88 and NY 7 westbound is made at an intersection just past the overpass carrying I-88 and NY 7 over NY 369.

North of Port Crane, NY 369 follows the eastern bank of the Chenango River for a short distance through rural Fenton before splitting from the waterway south of Chenango Valley State Park, which NY 369 passes to the east. The route ends shortly after passing the park at an intersection with NY 79 just south the Chenango County line in the hamlet of North Fenton.

== History ==
The entirety of modern NY 369 was assigned in the 1930 renumbering. At the time, NY 369 terminated on its southern end at a three-way intersection with NY 7 southwest of Port Crane. When NY 7 was upgraded on the spot to a limited-access highway between Chenango Bridge and Port Crane in the 1970s, the intersection was reconfigured into a curve feeding traffic directly to and from the old surface alignment of NY 7 (now NY 7B).

== Major intersections ==
The entire route is in Fenton, Broome County.

mi	km	Destinations	Notes
0.00	0.00	NY 7B east	Southern terminus; western terminus of NY 7B
0.30	0.48	I-88 / NY 7 – Binghamton, Oneonta	Hamlet of Port Crane; exit 3 (I-88/NY 7)
6.32	10.17	NY 79 – Chenango Forks	Hamlet of North Fenton; northern terminus
1.000 mi = 1.609 km; 1.000 km = 0.621 mi
