= New York State Route 7 =

State highway in New York, United States

New York State Route 7
- NY 7 highlighted in red, NY 7B in blue, and some former alignments maintained as reference routes in pink

Route information
- Maintained by NYSDOT and the cities of Binghamton and Oneonta
- Length: 180.30 mi (290.16 km)
- History: Designated NY 9 in 1924; renumbered to NY 7 in 1927

Major junctions
- South end: PA 29 at the Pennsylvania state line in Conklin
- US 11 in Binghamton; I-81 / Future I-86 / NY 17 in Binghamton; I-88 in Port Dickinson; NY 8 in Sidney; I-88 / NY 23 / NY 28 in Oneonta; US 20 in Duanesburg; NY 5 in Schenectady; I-87 / US 9 / NY 9R in Latham; I-787 / NY 787 in Colonie
- East end: VT 9 at the Vermont state line near Hoosick Falls

Location
- Country: United States
- State: New York
- Counties: Broome, Chenango, Otsego, Schoharie, Schenectady, Albany, Rensselaer

Highway system
- New York Highways; Interstate; US; State; Reference; Parkways
← NY 6N	→ NY 8
← NY 146B	NY 146C	→ NY 147

New York State Route 7 (NY 7) is a 180.30-mile-long (290.16 km) state highway in New York in the United States. The highway runs from the Pennsylvania state line south of Binghamton in Broome County, New York, to the Vermont state line east of Hoosick in Rensselaer County, where it continues as Vermont Route 9 (VT 9). Most of the road runs along the Susquehanna Valley, closely paralleling Interstate 88 (I-88) throughout that road's length. Portions of the highway route near the cities of Binghamton, Schenectady, and Troy date back to the early 19th century.

== Route description ==
=== Binghamton area ===
NY 7 begins at the Pennsylvania state line south of Corbettsville, where the road connects to Pennsylvania Route 29 (PA 29). Like PA 29 to the south, NY 7 follows Snake Creek north to Corbettsville, where it meets NY 7A on the banks of the Susquehanna River. From Corbettsville northward, NY 7 becomes the riverside highway, following the river (as well as U.S. Route 11 or US 11 and I-81 on the opposite bank) through Conklin to eastern Binghamton, where it indirectly connects to US 11 via a bridge over the Susquehanna.

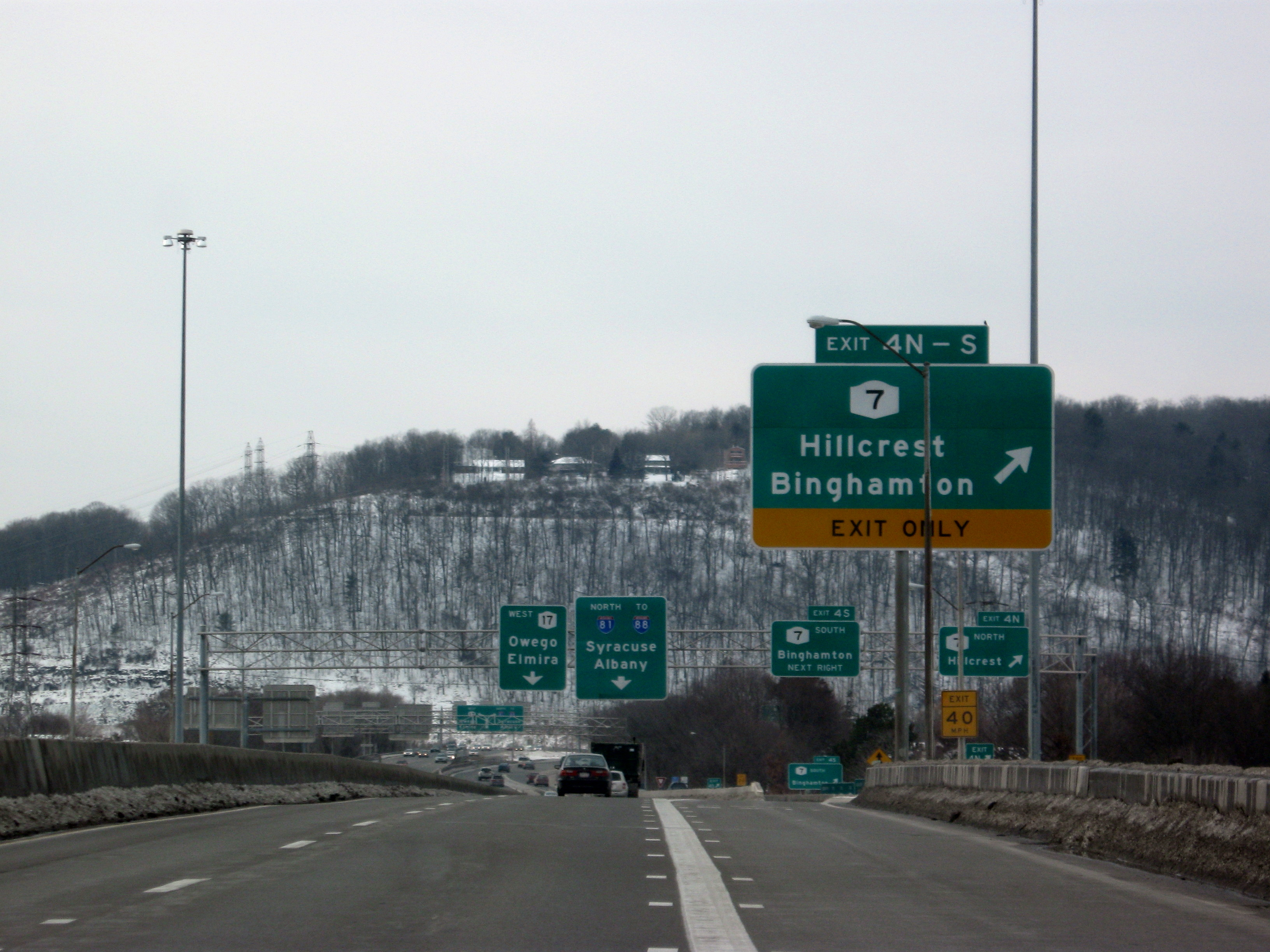
The exit for NY 7 from I-81 and NY 17 in Binghamton

The route continues west into downtown along Conklin Avenue, then heads north on Tompkins Avenue to traverse the Susquehanna River. On the opposite bank, NY 7 intersects US 11 and becomes Brandywine Avenue. After three blocks, NY 7 merges with NY 363, a limited-access highway. At this point, directional signage on NY 7 changes from north–south to east–west. NY 363 terminates at the merge while NY 7 follows its right-of-way northward as the limited-access Brandywine Highway, connecting to the concurrent routes of I-81 and NY 17 by way of an interchange before leaving city limits.

Immediately north of Binghamton, NY 7 continues following the Brandywine Highway through the village of Port Dickinson along a corridor shared with the former Freight Main line of the Delaware and Hudson Railway (now a branch of Norfolk Southern's Southern Tier Line). Just north of the village in the residential hamlet of Hillcrest, the Brandywine Highway terminates at a merge with I-88, across the Chenango River from the western terminus of I-88 at I-81. I-88 and NY 7 continue to the northeast along the Chenango River through Chenango Bridge (where the routes meet NY 12A) and Port Crane (where I-88 and NY 7 meet NY 369 and leave the path of the Chenango River) before separating in Sanitaria Springs. NY 7 is signed north–south from the PA line to US 11 Binghamton, while the remainder of the route is signed east–west.

=== Binghamton to Schenectady ===
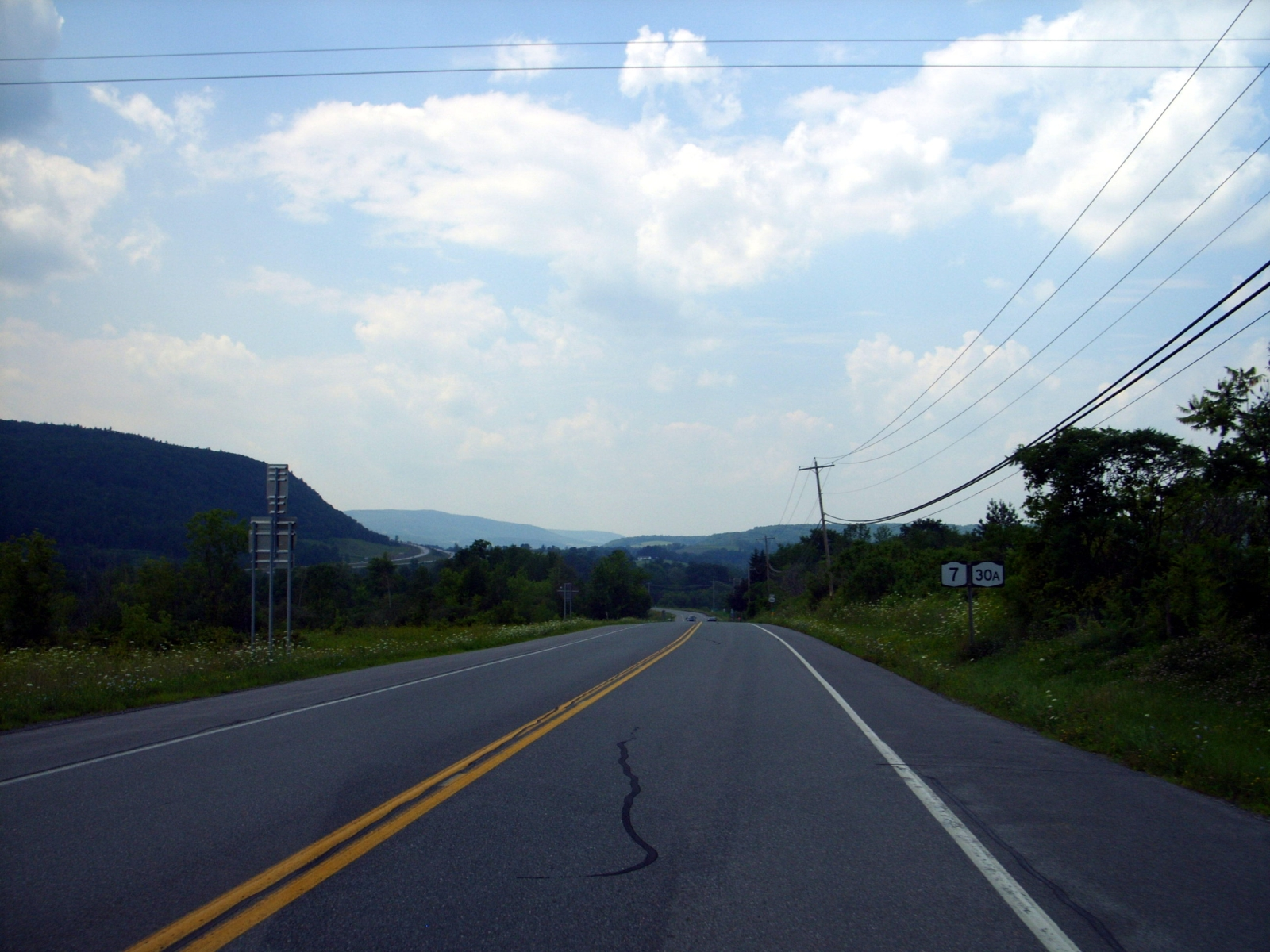
NY 7 overlaps NY 30A in the town of Schoharie.

From Sanitaria Springs eastward, I-88 and NY 7 follow parallel routings through Colesville to Harpursville, where NY 7 overlaps NY 79 for a short distance and intersects NY 235 outside of the community. East of NY 235, NY 7 rejoins the Susquehanna River, following the river (as well as I-88 on the opposite bank) through several riverside villages (including Bainbridge and Unadilla) to Oneonta. West of the city, NY 7 meets NY 23 and joins the route into the heart of Oneonta. Near the eastern edge of the city, NY 23 breaks from NY 7 at a roundabout while NY 7 continues onward in the shadow of I-88 and the Susquehanna River. To the northeast in Colliersville, the Susquehanna separates from NY 7 and is joined by NY 28 while NY 7 continues along the path of Schenevus Creek.

Both I-88 and NY 7 head northeast along the creek through numerous communities to Richmondville, where NY 7 meets NY 10 at an interchange with I-88 near Cobleskill Creek. NY 10 turns east onto NY 7, forming an overlap along the creek to Cobleskill before separating from NY 7 in the center of the village at an intersection with NY 145. NY 145 then overlaps NY 7 east out of the village before separating midway between Cobleskill and Schoharie near Howe Caverns. North of Schoharie, NY 7 briefly overlaps NY 30A across Schoharie Creek before intersecting NY 30 west of the Schoharie-Schenectady County line.

=== Capital District ===
In Duanesburg, southwest of Schenectady, NY 7 intersects US 20 and meets I-88 once more at exit 24. Both routes continue northeast along Normans Kill into western Schenectady, where I-88 meets NY 7 one final time by way of another interchange before terminating at an interchange with the New York State Thruway (I-90). NY 7, however, passes over the Thruway with no connection and heads east into Rotterdam as Duanesburg Road. In the center of the community, NY 7 turns east onto Curry Road, remaining on the roadway to an interchange with I-890 adjacent to the Schenectady Albany county line. NY 7 merges with I-890 northward for two exits (creating a wrong-way concurrency) before exiting onto the Crosstown Arterial.

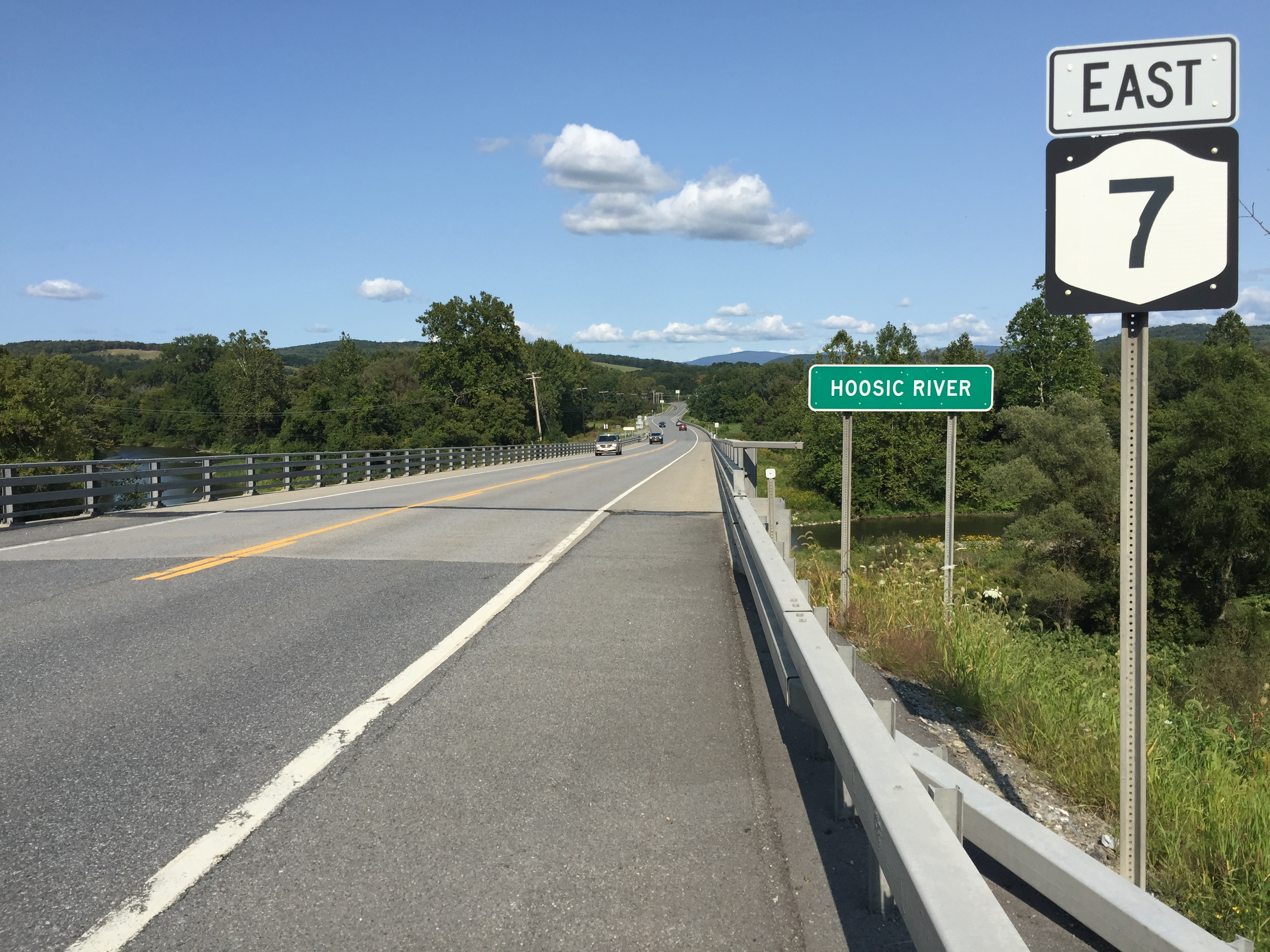
View east along NY 7 at NY 22, just before crossing the Hoosic River in Hoosick, Rensselaer County

At the end of the arterial in eastern Schenectady, NY 7 becomes the at-grade Troy–Schenectady Road as it heads along the south bank of the Mohawk River into Albany County. Shortly after entering the county and the Town of Colonie, NY 7 leaves the river and progresses southeast toward the hamlet of Latham. Soon after passing the Albany International Airport and prior to entering the center of Latham, NY 7 meets I-87 (the Adirondack Northway) at exit 6. Here, NY 7 joins the Adirondack Northway northward while Troy–Schenectady Road continues east as NY 2. At exit 7, NY 7 separates from the Adirondack Northway and continues east on a five-lane, limited-access freeway known locally as "Alternate Route 7". The route connects to US 9 and I-787 / NY 787 by way of interchanges prior to crossing over the Hudson River and into Troy over the Collar City Bridge. The route remains a limited-access highway to 8th Street, where it becomes the at-grade Hoosick Street.

NY 7 continues east through Troy, intersecting NY 40 before exiting the city. Past Troy, the land surrounding NY 7 is largely rural as it heads through Pittstown to Hoosick, where it meets and is briefly concurrent to NY 22. Farther east, NY 7 intersects the western end of the Bennington Bypass, a limited-access highway leading to Bennington, Vermont, before crossing into Vermont and becoming Vermont Route 9.

One of the canceled Interstate 92 proposals would have traced NY 7 from Albany to the Vermont border where it would continue via Vermont Route 9 through Bennington and Brattleboro, Vermont, with an intersection with I-91 in Brattleboro. It would have then followed New Hampshire Route 9 and I-89 to Concord, New Hampshire, then I-93 to Manchester, New Hampshire. Next, the highway would trace New Hampshire Route 101, intersecting with I-95 followed by US Route 1 in Hampton, New Hampshire, then terminating at the ocean.

== History ==
=== Origins and assignment ===
The history of parts of NY 7 dates back to shortly after the settlement of Hoosick in 1688. Hoosick was a part of the Manor of Rensselaerswyck and a public manor road was laid from Rensselaer to the site later of Troy at a ferry crossing, and then to the northeast as far as Hoosick. The section of NY 7 from Troy to Hoosick is that old manor road. The 19th century toll road known as the Troy and Schenectady Turnpike (now the Troy–Schenectady Road) was chartered in 1802, connecting the cities of Troy and Schenectady. Another turnpike road, the Troy Turnpike, was established in 1831 and went east from Troy to Bennington, Vermont. The road between Binghamton (at the location known as Chenango Point) through the village of Unadilla to the town of Otego may have been maintained as a turnpike road by the Unadilla Turnpike Company, which was chartered in 1806.

Portions of modern NY 7 between Binghamton and Central Bridge were part of the Susquehanna Valley Route Auto trail. The state took over maintenance of certain trunk line highways at the beginning of the 20th century. Most of modern NY 7 was first defined in the 1909 Highway Law (amended in 1911) as State Route 7, which was designated from the Pennsylvania state line at Binghamton town to Harpursville, then along the Susquehanna Valley through Oneonta to the town of Schoharie. From there, the legislative route 7 went east via Berne and New Scotland then ending in Albany. The portion of modern NY 7 continuing northeast from the town of Schoharie to Schenectady was part of State Route 7A. The portion of modern NY 7 between Troy and Schenectady was defined as part of State Route 42, while that between Troy and Hoosick was part of State Route 22.

In 1924, when state highways were first publicly signed, most of what is now NY 7 between Binghamton and the Vermont state line was designated as New York State Route 9, continuing the numbering of New England Route 9 in Vermont. Around Albany, NY 9 followed the modern routing of NY 2 through Latham to Troy, where the connection to the modern alignment of NY 7 was made via current US 4. In 1927, NY 9 was redesignated as NY 7 to avoid conflict with US 9. The route north of Binghamton remained unchanged in the 1930 renumbering; however, south of Binghamton, NY 7 was extended to the Pennsylvania state line, where it became PA 29.

=== Realignments ===
Over the years, NY 7 has been realigned to follow different routings in and around the cities it serves. Prior to 1930, NY 7 began at Court Street in Binghamton and followed Chenango Street north into Fenton, where it turned east and continued through Port Crane to the Colesville hamlet of Sanitaria Springs. In the 1930 renumbering, NY 7 was extended south to Pennsylvania by way of Court Street, Tompkins Street, and Conklin Avenue. NY 7 was realigned slightly by 1947 to follow Robinson Street and Brandywine Avenue between Chenango and Tompkins streets. The Brandywine Highway, a four-lane arterial through Binghamton and Port Dickinson, opened to traffic c. 1961 as a realignment of NY 7. The portion of NY 7 between Port Dickinson and Sanitaria Springs was relocated onto a new limited-access highway between 1968 and 1973. The segment of Chenango Street between the Binghamton city line and current NY 7 in Port Dickinson (a distance of 1.07 miles or 1.72 kilometres) is now NY 990H, an unsigned reference route. The former pre I-88 routing of NY 7 between Port Crane and Sanitaria Springs is now NY 7B. Prior to becoming NY 7B in the 1990s, it was designated NY 990K, an unsigned reference route.

In Schenectady, it was originally routed along Broadway, State Street, Nott Terrace, and Union Street. It was shifted at some point between 1938 and 1947 to avoid downtown along Curry Road, Altamont Avenue and Brandywine Avenue. The former alignment along Union Street east of NY 146 later became reference route NY 911G, and Broadway from Edison and Millard to I-890 became NY 914D, and NY 915D from there to Weaver Road. Meanwhile, the portion of Curry Road between Altamont Avenue and NY 146 was designated as NY 146C in the mid-1930s. NY 7 was rerouted c. 1962 to follow Curry Road east from Altamont Avenue to the new I-890, where NY 7 turned north and followed I-890 to modern exit 7. Here, the route split from I-890 and continued to the junction of Union Street and Rosendale Road east of the city by way of a new arterial. The NY 146C designation was removed from Curry Road as part of the change. NY 7's former routing along Altamont Avenue from Curry Road to the Schenectady city line (a length of 0.96 miles or 1.54 kilometres) is now the unsigned NY 911H. Prior to the creation of the modern reference route system, Altamont Avenue was designated as NY 951. Reference markers along the route still bear this number.

In 1980, the Collar City Bridge opened, connecting Green Island with Troy in the Capital District. By 1983, construction had begun on the NY 7 freeway, then planned as NY 7 Alternate, between I-87 and I-787 west of Green Island. The new freeway opened at the end of 1985, becoming part of a realigned NY 7, and the old surface alignment was designated as an extension of NY 2. However, the freeway segment of NY 7 between I-87 and I-787 is still commonly referred to as "Alternate Route 7".

NY 28 originally overlapped NY 7 from the intersection of Main and Chestnut streets in Oneonta to Colliersville, where it turned north onto D.K. Lifgren Drive to rejoin NY 28's modern alignment. NY 28 was rerouted to follow its current alignment between Main Street south of Oneonta and D.K. Lifgren Drive near Colliersville in the early 1980s following the completion of what is now NY 28 from I-88 exit 17 to D.K. Lifgren Drive. The portion of Main Street between NY 28 and NY 7 (0.67 miles or 1.08 kilometres long) is now designated as NY 992D while D.K. Lifgren Drive (0.50 miles or 0.80 kilometres in length) is now NY 992G.

== Major intersections ==
County	Location	mi	km	Exit	Destinations	Notes
Broome	Conklin	0.00	0.00		PA 29 south – Montrose	Continuation into Pennsylvania
Broome	Conklin	1.26	2.03		NY 7A south – Hallstead	Northern terminus of NY 7A; hamlet of Corbettsville
Broome	Conklin	2.81	4.52		To I-81 / US 11 – Kirkwood	Access via Kirkwood Conklin Road
Broome	Kirkwood				To I-81 / I-86 / NY 17 / US 11	Access via Conklin Kirkwood Road
Broome	Binghamton	11.18	17.99		US 11	
Broome	Binghamton	11.57	18.62	Western end of limited-access section		
Broome	Binghamton	11.57	18.62	–	NY 363 south	Westbound exit and eastbound entrance; northern terminus of NY 363
Broome	Binghamton	11.97	19.26	–	I-81 / Future I-86 / NY 17 – Syracuse, Corning, Scranton, New York City	Exit 12 on I-81
Broome	Port Dickinson	13.54	21.79	–	Hillcrest Service Roads – Port Dickinson	Eastbound exit and westbound entrance
Broome	Fenton	14.10	22.69	1	I-88 west to I-81 / NY 17	Westbound exit and eastbound entrance; western terminus of concurrency with I-88
Broome	Fenton	15.81	25.44	2	NY 12A west – Chenango Bridge	Eastern terminus of NY 12A
Broome	Fenton	18.06	29.06	3	NY 369 – Port Crane	
Broome	Colesville	21.23	34.17	4	I-88 east – Albany	Eastern terminus of concurrency with I-88; diamond interchange; hamlet of Sanitaria Springs
Broome	Colesville	21.23	34.17	Eastern end of limited-access section		
Broome	Colesville	21.53	34.65		NY 7B west	Eastern terminus of NY 7B
Broome	Colesville	28.49	45.85		NY 79 west – North Fenton	Western terminus of concurrency with NY 79
Broome	Colesville	29.73	47.85		NY 79 east to I-88 – Harpursville, Binghamton	Eastern terminus of concurrency with NY 79; hamlet of Harpursville
Broome	Colesville	30.88	49.70		NY 235 north – Coventry	Southern terminus of NY 235; hamlet of Nineveh
Chenango	Village of Afton	37.18	59.84		NY 41 – Coventryville, Deposit	
Chenango	Village of Bainbridge	42.91	69.06		NY 206 (Main Street) to I-88	
Otsego	Unadilla	47.21	75.98		NY 8 to I-88 – Sidney, Binghamton, Sidney Airport, Mount Upton	
Otsego	Village of Unadilla	52.10	83.85		To I-88 – Binghamton, Albany	Access via NY 991H
Otsego	Village of Unadilla	53.39	85.92		NY 357 east to I-88 – Franklin, Oneonta	Western terminus of NY 357
Otsego	Town of Oneonta	67.53	108.68		NY 205 to I-88 – Morris, Binghamton	
Otsego	Town of Oneonta	68.61	110.42		NY 23 west (Chestnut Street) – Gilbert Lake State Park	Western terminus of concurrency with NY 23; neighborhood of West End
Otsego	City of Oneonta	70.51	113.47		To I-88 west	Access via NY 992D; former NY 28
Otsego	City of Oneonta	70.88	114.07		NY 23 east to I-88 / NY 28	Eastern terminus of concurrency with NY 23; roundabout
Otsego	Town of Oneonta				I-88 / CR 47 south – Emmons, Davenport Center	Northern terminus of CR 47; exit 16 on I-88
Otsego	Milford	75.89	122.13		To I-88 / NY 28 – Milford, Cooperstown	Access via NY 992G; hamlet of Colliersville
Otsego	Worcester	91.76	147.67		To I-88 – Oneonta, Albany, Binghamton	Access via NY 992J; hamlet of Worcester
Schoharie	Town of Richmondville	103.07	165.88		I-88 / NY 10 south – Oneonta, Binghamton, Albany	Access to I-88 via NY 992K; western terminus of concurrency with NY 10; exit 20 on I-88
Schoharie	Town of Richmondville	103.60	166.73		To I-88 – Oneonta, Binghamton, Albany	Access via NY 992L
Schoharie	Village of Cobleskill	107.54	173.07		NY 10 north / NY 145 north – Sharon	Eastern terminus of concurrency with NY 10; western terminus of concurrency with NY 145
Schoharie	Town of Cobleskill	110.94	178.54		NY 145 south to I-88 – Middleburgh, Binghamton, Albany	Eastern terminus of concurrency with NY 145
Schoharie	Town of Schoharie	115.76	186.30		NY 30A north – Sloansville	Western terminus of concurrency with NY 30A; hamlet of Central Bridge
Schoharie	Town of Schoharie	116.89	188.12		NY 30A south to I-88 – Schoharie, Binghamton, Albany	Eastern terminus of concurrency with NY 30A
Schoharie	Town of Esperance	118.90	191.35		NY 30 – Amsterdam, Schoharie, Esperance	
Schenectady	Town of Duanesburg	123.75	199.16		NY 395 north – Delanson	Southern terminus of NY 395
Schenectady	Town of Duanesburg	127.07	204.50		US 20 – Esperance, Albany	Hamlet of Duanesburg
Schenectady	Town of Duanesburg	128.06	206.09		To I-88 / New York Thruway (I-90 Toll) – Binghamton, Albany	
Schenectady	Town of Rotterdam	132.94	213.95		To I-88 / New York Thruway (I-90 Toll) – Binghamton	Access via Becker Road
Schenectady	Community of Rotterdam	133.96	215.59		NY 337 north (Burdeck Street)	Southern terminus of NY 337
Schenectady	Community of Rotterdam	135.41	217.92		NY 159 west (Mariaville Road)	Eastern terminus of NY 159
Schenectady	Community of Rotterdam	135.95	218.79		NY 158 south (Guilderland Avenue)	Northern terminus of NY 158
Schenectady	Community of Rotterdam	136.82	220.19		Altamont Avenue (NY 911H north)	Former routing of NY 7
Schenectady	Community of Rotterdam	138.21	222.43		NY 146 to I-90 Toll / New York Thruway	Roundabout
Albany	Guilderland	138.96	223.63	Western end of limited-access section		
Albany	Guilderland	138.96	223.63	9	I-890 east / Curry Road	Western terminus of concurrency with I-890; exit number not signed eastbound
Schenectady	Community of Rotterdam	139.83	225.03	8	High Bridge Road	
Schenectady	Community of Rotterdam	140.47	226.06	7	I-890 west / Chrisler Avenue – Schenectady	No eastbound access to Chrisler Avenue; eastern terminus of concurrency with I-890; exit number not signed westbound
Schenectady	Schenectady	141.33	227.45	–	NY 5 – Downtown Schenectady	
Schenectady	Niskayuna	142.53	229.38	–	Balltown Road (NY 914T) to NY 146	At-grade intersection
Schenectady	Niskayuna	142.76	229.75	Eastern end of limited-access section		
Schenectady	Niskayuna	142.76	229.75		CR 158 east (Rosendale Road)	Western terminus of CR 158
Albany	Town of Colonie	146.36	235.54		CR 158 west (Rosendale Road) – Erie Canal Lock 7	Eastern terminus of CR 158; former NY 7C
Albany	Town of Colonie	147.06	236.67		CR 151 west (Albany Shaker Road) to NY 155 (Albany International Airport)	Western terminus of CR 151; hamlet of Verdoy
Albany	Town of Colonie	150.01	241.42	Western end of freeway section		
Albany	Town of Colonie	150.01	241.42	6	I-87 south / NY 2 east – Albany, Watervliet, New York City	Southern terminus of concurrency with I-87; western terminus of NY 2
Albany	Town of Colonie	150.28	241.85	7	I-87 north – Saratoga Springs, Glens Falls, Montreal	Northern terminus of concurrency with I-87; exit number not signed westbound
Albany	Town of Colonie	150.72	242.56	–	US 9 / NY 9R – Latham, Cohoes	
Albany	Town of Colonie	154.34	248.39	–	I-787 south / NY 787 north – Albany, Watervliet, Cohoes	Exits 9E and 9W on I-787/NY 787
Hudson River				Collar City Bridge		
Rensselaer	Troy	154.75	249.05	–	Downtown Troy	Eastbound exit and westbound entrance; access via 6th Avenue/Hutton Street
Rensselaer	Troy	154.82	249.16	–	Hoosick Street to US 4	Westbound exit and eastbound entrance
Rensselaer	Troy	154.82	249.16	Eastern end of freeway section		
Rensselaer	Troy	154.95	249.37		NY 40 north (10th Street) – Schaghticoke	Southern terminus of NY 40
Rensselaer	Brunswick	158.58	255.21		NY 142 north (Grange Road) – Lansingburgh	Southern terminus of NY 142; hamlet of Brunswick Center
Rensselaer	Brunswick	159.61	256.87		NY 278 south (Brick Church Road) to NY 2 – Grafton Lakes State Park	Northern terminus of NY 278
Rensselaer	Hoosick	175.84	282.99		NY 22 south – Petersburgh	Western terminus of concurrency with NY 22
Rensselaer	Hoosick	176.19	283.55		NY 22 north – Hoosick Falls	Eastern terminus of concurrency with NY 22
Rensselaer	Hoosick	179.43	288.76		To VT 279 east – Brattleboro VT, Rutland VT, Bennington College	Access via NY 915G
Rensselaer	Hoosick	180.30	290.16		VT 9 east – Bennington	Continuation into Vermont
1.000 mi = 1.609 km; 1.000 km = 0.621 mi: Concurrency terminus; Incomplete access

== Suffixed routes ==
NY 7 currently has two spurs, both located in the Southern Tier. A third formerly existed in the Capital District near Schenectady.

=== NY 7A ===
New York State Route 7A
- Location: Conklin
- Length: 1.77 mi (2.85 km)
- Existed: 1930–present

New York State Route 7A (NY 7A) (1.77 miles or 2.85 kilometres) is a spur in the Broome County town of Conklin that connects NY 7 to the Pennsylvania state line. While NY 7 follows a creek valley to the Pennsylvania border, NY 7A continues NY 7's course along the Susquehanna River valley, paralleling US 11 and I-81. When NY 7A was assigned as part of the 1930 renumbering of state highways in New York, it connected to PA 602; it now connects to SR 1033, an unsigned quadrant route.

Major intersections

The entire route is in Broome County.

Location	mi	km	Destinations	Notes
Conklin	0.00	0.00	SR 1033 south (New York Avenue) – Hallstead	Continuation into Great Bend Township, Pennsylvania
Corbettsville	1.77	2.85	NY 7 – Binghamton, Montrose	Northern terminus
1.000 mi = 1.609 km; 1.000 km = 0.621 mi

=== NY 7B ===
New York State Route 7B
- Location: Fenton–Colesville
- Length: 3.74 mi (6.02 km)
- Existed: 1990s–present

The current New York State Route 7B (NY 7B) designation is a 3.74-mile (6.02 km) spur in the Broome County towns of Fenton and Colesville. It follows the former, pre-expressway routing of NY 7 between NY 369 in the hamlet of Port Crane and NY 7 in the hamlet of Sanitaria Springs. Prior to becoming NY 7B in the 1990s, it was designated NY 990K, an unsigned reference route.

Major intersections

The entire route is in Broome County.

Location	mi	km	Destinations	Notes
Port Crane	0.00	0.00	NY 369 north	Southern terminus of NY 369
Sanitaria Springs	3.74	6.02	NY 7 to I-88 – Albany, Binghamton	To exit 4 on I-88 / NY 7
1.000 mi = 1.609 km; 1.000 km = 0.621 mi

=== NY 7B (1930-1970) ===
New York State Route 7B
- Location: Unadilla–Oneonta
- Existed: 1930–January 1, 1970

The original NY 7B was an alternate route of NY 7 from Unadilla to Oneonta that was assigned as part of the 1930 renumbering. It overlapped NY 28 from North Franklin to Oneonta. On November 27, 1969, the New York State Department of Transportation Commissioner T. W. Parker announced that NY 7B would be renumbered to NY 357. This new designation would also truncate NY 7B off the overlap with NY 28 to Oneonta and simplify signage for drivers to understand in the city of Oneonta. This would also open the door for signage to be added for future Interstate 88. On January 1, 1970, the North Franklin–Oneonta portion was removed and the Unadilla–North Franklin portion of NY 7B was renumbered to NY 357. If the weather permitted, the official signage would be replaced in the spring of 1970.

=== NY 7C ===
New York State Route 7C
- Location: Niskayuna–Colonie
- Existed: c. 1961–late 1960s

NY 7C was a loop off of NY 7 east of Schenectady in the Capital District. The majority of the route was located in Schenectady County; however, the easternmost 40 yards (37 m) of the route was located in Albany County. It began at NY 7 in Niskayuna and proceeded east along Rosendale Road into Colonie, where it ended at NY 7. The route was assigned c. 1961 and removed in the late 1960s. Ownership and maintenance of NY 7C's former routing in Schenectady County was transferred from the state of New York to the county on April 1, 1980, as part of a highway maintenance swap between the two levels of government. This portion of the route is now designated as County Route 158.

== See also ==
- List of county routes in Schenectady County, New York
