= North Fenton, New York =

- Hamlet
- Location within New York Location within the United States
- Coordinates: 42°14′33″N 75°47′41″W
- Country: United States
- State: New York
- County: Broome
- Town: Fenton
- Elevation: 971 ft (296 m)
- Time zone: UTC-5 (Eastern (EST))
  - Summer (DST): UTC-4 (EDT)
- Area code: 607

North Fenton is a hamlet in New York. It is part of the Town of Fenton, Broome County at the corner of NY-79 and NY-369 by the north town line. It was originally called Ketchums Corners.
