= Conklin, New York =

- Town
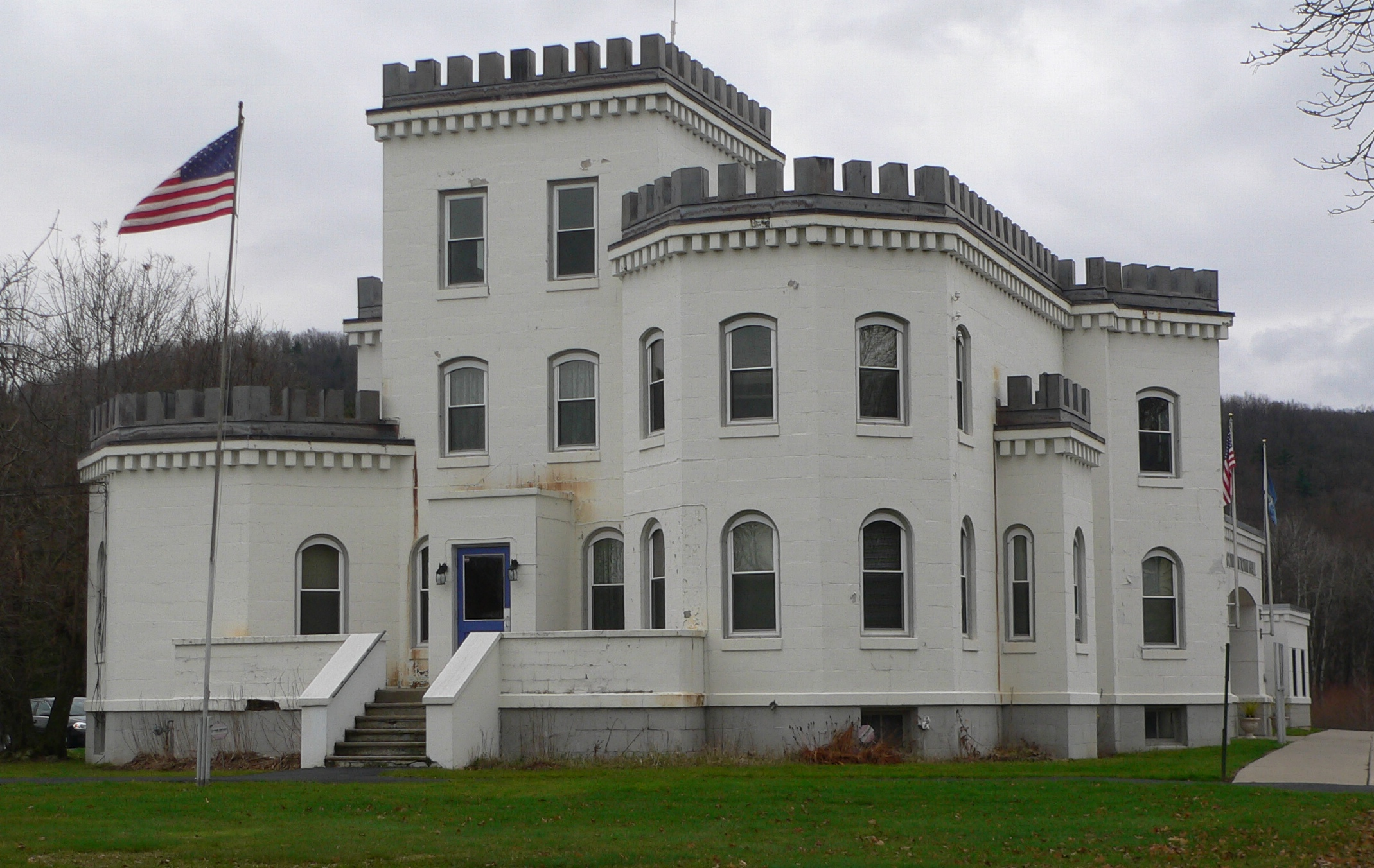
- "The Castle"; Alpheus Corby house, which is also the Conklin Town Hall

- Shield

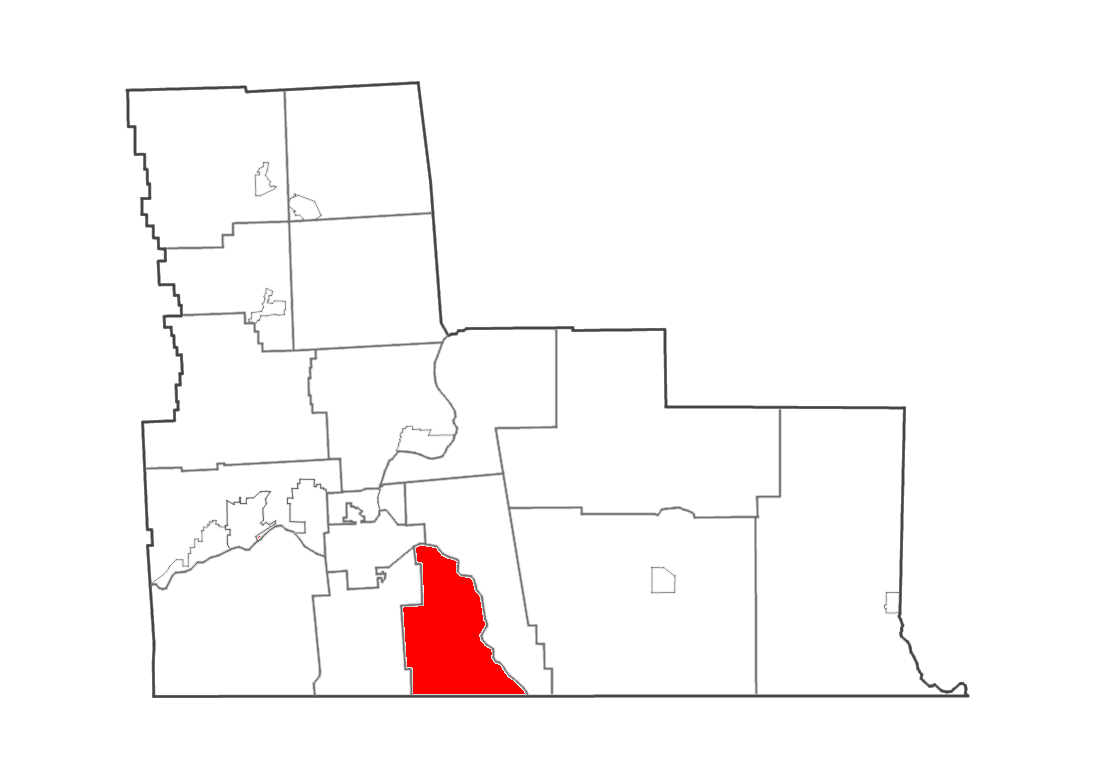
- Location within Broome County

- Location within New York Location within the United States
- Coordinates: 42°3′11″N 75°49′39″W
- Country: United States
- State: New York
- County: Broome

Government
  - Type: Town Council
  - Town Supervisor: William Dumian
  - Town Council: Members' List: • Bill Dumian; • Gary D. Bullock; • Jerry Minoia; • Charles Francisco

Area
  - Total: 24.89 sq mi (64.46 km^{2})
  - Land: 24.39 sq mi (63.16 km^{2})
  - Water: 0.51 sq mi (1.31 km^{2})
- Elevation: 1,165 ft (355 m)

Population (2020)
  - Total: 5,008
  - Density: 205.4/sq mi (79.29/km^{2})
- Time zone: UTC−5 (Eastern (EST))
  - Summer (DST): UTC−4 (EDT)
- ZIP Codes: 13748 (Conklin); 13903 (Binghamton)
- Area code: 607
- FIPS code: 36-007-17772
- GNIS feature ID: 0978861
- Website: townofconklin.gov

Conklin is a town in Broome County, New York, United States. Per the 2020 census, the population was 5,008.

The town is on the south border of the county, southeast of Binghamton.

== History ==
The area was first settled around 1788. The Town of Conklin was established in 1824 from the town of Chenango by Nicholas Conklin (1782–1858). The town exchanged territories with adjacent towns before establishing its modern boundaries. In 1831, part of Conklin was used to form the town of Windsor, but Conklin received territory from Windsor in 1851. Another part of Conklin was used in 1859 to form the town of Kirkwood.

Alpheus Corby, a Conklin resident, built a castle-like structure as his home in 1900. The building is the current town hall.

In June 2006, the town was devastated by a massive flood that isolated the center of the town and required hundreds of people to be airlifted to safety. The flood destroyed hundreds of homes and businesses and caused tens of millions of dollars in damage.

The Conklin Town Hall was listed on the National Register of Historic Places in 2006.

The town experienced another major flood in September 2011 as a result of Tropical Storm Lee.

== Geography ==
According to the United States Census Bureau, the town has a total area of 24.9 square miles (64.5 km^{2}), of which 24.4 square miles (63.2 km^{2}) is land and 0.50 square miles (1.3 km^{2}), or 2.02%, is water.

The southern town line is the border of Susquehanna County in Pennsylvania. The eastern town line is marked by the Susquehanna River. Snake Creek, a tributary of the Susquehanna, was the site of early town settlement.

New York State Route 7 splits off New York State Route 7A in the southeast corner of the town by Corbettsville.

=== Communities and locations in Conklin ===
- Corbettsville – A hamlet on NY-7 in the southern part of the town.
- Conklin – The hamlet of Conklin by the Susquehanna River on NY-7. Access to Interstate 81's Exit 1 is across the Susquehanna via the Conklin-Kirkwood Bridge.
- Conklin Forks – A hamlet in the western part of the town at the junction of County Roads 8 and 141.
- Conklin Station – A hamlet north of Corbettsville on NY-7. It was previously called "Milburn."
- Conklin Center – A hamlet north of Conklin village on NY-7.

== Demographics ==
Historical population
Census	Pop.	Note	%±
1830	908		—
1840	1,475		62.4%
1850	2,232		51.3%
1860	1,146		−48.7%
1870	1,440		25.7%
1880	1,420		−1.4%
1890	1,033		−27.3%
1900	946		−8.4%
1910	850		−10.1%
1920	796		−6.4%
1930	1,332		67.3%
1940	2,156		61.9%
1950	2,872		33.2%
1960	4,347		51.4%
1970	5,399		24.2%
1980	6,204		14.9%
1990	6,265		1.0%
2000	5,940		−5.2%
2010	5,441		−8.4%
2020	5,008		−8.0%
U.S. Decennial Census; 2010 2020

=== 2020 census ===
Conklin town, Broome County, New York – Demographic Profile (NH = Non-Hispanic)
Race / Ethnicity	Pop 2010	Pop 2020	% 2010	% 2020
White alone (NH)	5,218	4,458	95.90%	89.02%
Black or African American alone (NH)	53	48	0.97%	0.96%
Native American or Alaska Native alone (NH)	8	10	0.15%	0.20%
Asian alone (NH)	16	37	0.29%	0.74%
Pacific Islander alone (NH)	0	0	0.00%	0.00%
Some Other Race alone (NH)	3	16	0.06%	0.32%
Mixed Race/Multi-Racial (NH)	67	310	1.23%	6.19%
Hispanic or Latino (any race)	76	129	1.40%	2.58%
Total	5,441	5,008	100.00%	100.00%

Note: the US Census treats Hispanic/Latino as an ethnic category. This table excludes Latinos from the racial categories and assigns them to a separate category. Hispanics/Latinos can be of any race.

=== 2000 census ===
As of the census of 2000, there were 5,940 people, 2,249 households, and 1,671 families residing in the town. The median household income was $37,445. The population density was 242.3 inhabitants per square mile (93.6/km^{2}). There were 2,435 housing units at an average density of 99.3 per square mile (38.3/km^{2}). The racial makeup of the town was 97.7% White, 0.8% African American, 0.1% Native American, 0.2% Asian, 0.3% from other races, and 0.8% from two or more races. Hispanic or Latino of any race were 0.9% of the population.

There were 2,249 households, out of which 35.2% had children under the age of 18 living with them, 59.5% were married couples living together, 10.6% had a female householder with no husband present, and 25.7% were non-families. Of all households, 20.9% were made up of individuals, and 8.1% had someone living alone who was 65 years of age or older. The average household size was 2.64 and the average family size was 3.06.

In the town, the population was spread out, with 27.1% under the age of 18, 6.5% from 18 to 24, 29.1% from 25 to 44, 25.1% from 45 to 64, and 12.2% who were 65 years of age or older. The median age was 38 years. For every 100 females, there were 97.1 males. For every 100 females age 18 and over, there were 93.7 males.

2020 census

For the 2020 census, the population was 5,008. The median income for a household in the town was $58,311, with the mean income of $71,489. For families, the median income was $70,399 with a mean of $86,306. There were 33.6% of families that made over $100,000. The per capita income for the town was $30,038. About 8.9% of the population were below the poverty line, including 2.4% of those under age 18 and 8.1% of those age 65 or over.

== Notable people ==
- Amos J. Cummings, United States Representative and Medal of Honor recipient
- Charles E. Fuller, member of the New York State Assembly
- Jerome Anthony Watrous, writer, military officer, legislator
- Jim Whitney, professional baseball player
