= Kirkwood, New York =

- Town
- Motto: "A fine place to live. A good place to learn."
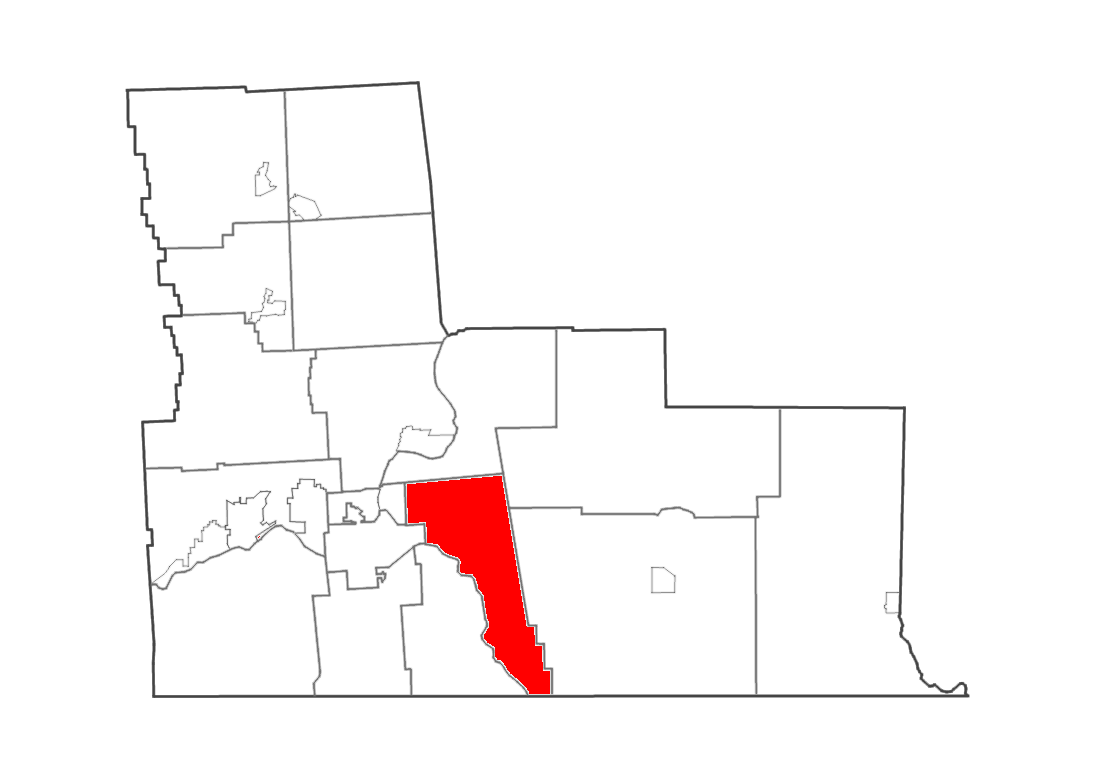
- Location in Broome County

- Location within New York Location within the United States
- Coordinates: 42°4′52″N 75°48′35″W
- Country: United States
- State: New York
- County: Broome

Government
  - Type: Town Council
  - Town Supervisor: Lewis "Lew" C. Grubham
  - Town Council: Members' List: • Robert Weingartner; • William Diffendorf, Jr.; • Katie Legg; • Arthur Shafer

Area
  - Total: 31.21 sq mi (80.83 km^{2})
  - Land: 30.81 sq mi (79.80 km^{2})
  - Water: 0.40 sq mi (1.03 km^{2})
- Elevation: 1,037 ft (316 m)

Population (2020)
  - Total: 5,495 ▼
  - Estimate (2021): 5,437
  - Density: 184/sq mi (71.1/km^{2})
- Time zone: UTC-5 (Eastern (EST))
  - Summer (DST): UTC-4 (EDT)
- ZIP Codes: 13795 (Kirkwood); 13904 (Binghamton); 13865 (Windsor)
- Area code: 607
- FIPS code: 36-007-39837
- GNIS feature ID: 0979121
- Website: townofkirkwood.gov

Kirkwood is a town in Broome County, New York, United States. The population was 5,495 as of the 2020 census. The town is named after James P. Kirkwood, the civil engineer responsible for constructing the local railroad.

The town is located within the Binghamton Metropolitan Area, and lies approximately 10 miles southeast of the city proper. The town itself is also in close proximity to the border with the U.S. State of Pennsylvania, and both Interstate 81 and New York Route 7 run through it.

== History ==
c. 1781, Jonathan Fitch built a water-powered gristmill at what is present-day Fivemile Point, becoming the first settler to live in the area. Many others arrived in the years following and settled on the Susquehanna River, enabling the area (which was then a part of the larger town of Conklin) to develop into a location more suitable for an agrarian lifestyle. Evidence of pre-colonial history can be found in the form of Native American artifacts along the river, many of which can still be found today.

Prior to the separation of the two communities, modern day Kirkwood was a part of Conklin, New York. However, the two areas were separated by the Susquehanna River, and this made carrying out government duties very difficult. The onset of inclement weather during a large part of the year only exacerbated the issue (In spite of advances in infrastructure during the 19th century, including the eventual construction of a bridge between both communities), and as a result, it was decided that Kirkwood would be established as an independent community in November 1859. The town of Conklin, however, would maintain its existence on the southern side of the Susquehanna as a separate entity.

In June 2006 and September 2011, parts of the town, including hundreds of homes, were damaged when the Susquehanna River overflowed its banks.

== Geography ==
According to the United States Census Bureau, the town has a total area of 31.2 square miles (80.8 km^{2}), of which 30.8 square miles (79.8 km^{2}) is land and 0.39 square miles (1.0 km^{2}), or 1.27%, is water.

The southern town line is the state line of Pennsylvania at Susquehanna County, Pennsylvania.

The Susquehanna River forms the western border, the main course of which passes west of Berkalew Island which is part of the town. U.S. Route 11 and Interstate 81 pass through the town, following the course of the Susquehanna. Interstate 86/New York State Route 17 passes across the north part of the town.

== Demographics ==
Historical population
Census	Pop.	Note	%±
1860	1,389		—
1870	1,402		0.9%
1880	1,344		−4.1%
1890	1,119		−16.7%
1900	918		−18.0%
1910	852		−7.2%
1920	899		5.5%
1930	1,237		37.6%
1940	2,150		73.8%
1950	2,997		39.4%
1960	4,651		55.2%
1970	5,687		22.3%
1980	5,834		2.6%
1990	6,096		4.5%
2000	5,647		−7.4%
2010	5,857		3.7%
2020	5,495		−6.2%
2021 (est.)	5,437		−1.1%
U.S. Decennial Census

As of the 2000 United States census, there were 5,651 people, 2,247 households, and 1,611 families residing in the town. The population density was 182.5 inhabitants per square mile (70.5/km^{2}), and 2,469 housing units at an average density of 79.7 per square mile (30.8/km^{2}). The racial makeup of the town was 97.75% White, 0.60% African American, 0.18% Native American, 0.39% Asian, 0.02% Pacific Islander, 0.16% from other races, and 0.90% from two or more races. Hispanic or Latino of any race were 0.64% of the population.

There were a total of 2,247 households, out of which 31.3% had children under the age of 18 living with them, 57.5% were married couples living together, 9.8% had a female householder with no husband present, and 28.3% were non-families. 22.4% of all households were made up of individuals, and 9.2% had someone living alone who was 65 years of age or older. The average household size was 2.51 and the average family size was 2.92.

In the town itself, the population was spread out, with 24.0% under the age of 18, 7.0% from 18 to 24, 28.9% from 25 to 44, 25.2% from 45 to 64, and 15.0% who were 65 years of age or older. The median age was 39 years. For every 100 females, there were 99.5 males. For every 100 females age 18 and over, there were 96.4 males.

The median income for a household in the town was $38,279, and the median income for a family was $45,993. Males had a median income of $34,543 versus $23,275 for females. The per capita income for the town was $19,228. About 4.0% of families and 5.9% of the population were below the poverty line, including 8.3% of those under age 18 and 5.2% of those age 65 or over.

Windsor Central School District is the primary school district in Kirkwood among other towns including Windsor and West Windsor. Susquehanna Valley Central School District encompasses the southernmost part of Kirkwood, as well as the towns of Conklin and Binghamton.

== Communities ==
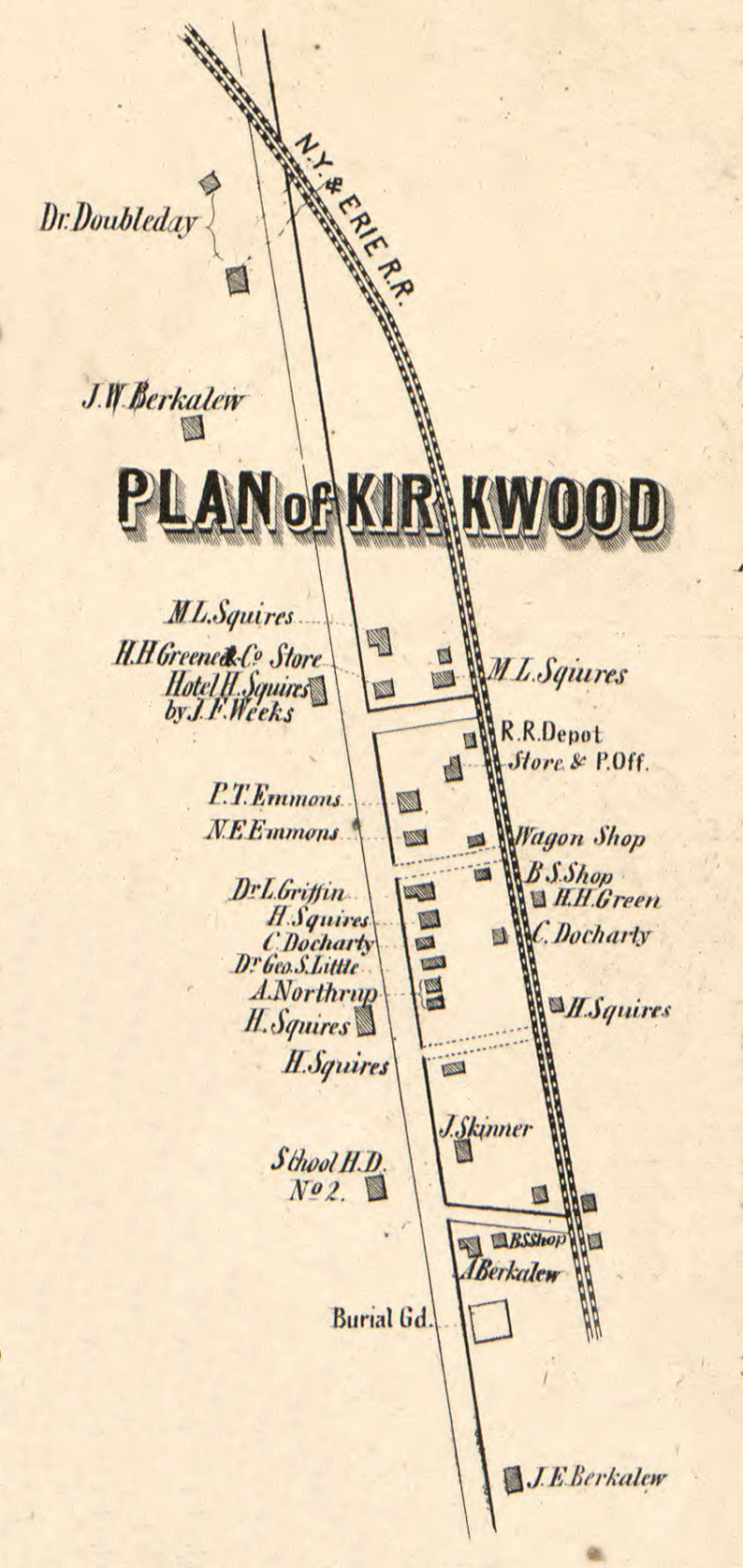
Plan of Kirkwood (1855)

Kirkwood is located in the central part of Broome County, geographically adjacent to the northeast bank of the Susquehanna River. The town's boundaries extend from the Binghamton city limits on the north, to the Pennsylvania border on the south.

Kirkwood's hamlets and their locations within town boundaries (from north to south) are:

- Popes Ravine – Northwest Kirkwood, along the Susquehanna River and bordering the city of Binghamton.
- Brookvale (formerly "Stanley Hollow") – Northeast Kirkwood, on County Road 52. This hamlet is no longer formally recognized, but Brookvale remains a landmark community within town.
- Five Mile Point – North of Kirkwood Center, nearest the junction of I-81 and NY 17. Named due to its location, five miles from Binghamton's Broome County Courthouse.
- Kirkwood Center (also simply "Kirkwood") – Small, geographical center of town, along its western border. Located halfway between Binghamton and Kirkwood Village, and between US 11 and I-81.
- Langdon – North of Kirkwood Village, on County Road 32.
- Kirkwood Village – Largest hamlet within town, located along the Susquehanna River bank and US 11.
- Riverside – Southernmost part of town, a mile north of the Pennsylvania border and along US 11.

== Notable people ==
- George E. Green, politician and businessman
- Charles F. Tupper, lawyer and businessman
