= 2000 Goodwill Winter Games =

Multi-sport event in Lake Placid, New York

2000 Winter Goodwill Games
- Host city: Lake Placid, New York
- Country: United States
- Nations: 20
- Athletes: 500
- Opening: 16 February 2000
- Closing: 20 February 2000

The 2000 Winter Goodwill Games was the first and only winter edition of the international sports competition Goodwill Games. The competition was held in and around Lake Placid in the United States from February 16 to February 20, 2000. Approximately 500 athletes from 20 countries participated, competing in 11 sports.

The United States topped the medal table with 11 gold medals and 34 medals in total. In second place was Canada, with 8 gold medals and 15 medals in total. Germany finished in third place, with 8 total medals.

Television coverage was provided exclusively on TNT in the United States, with the network airing 16 hours of coverage.

One world record was set during these games; by Bulgaria's Evgenia Radanova during the 500 meters of short track speedskating.

== Sports ==
- Alpine skiing
- Bobsleigh
- Cross-country skiing
- Figure skating
- Luge
- Nordic combined
- Nordic skiing
- Skeleton
- Ski jumping
- Snowboarding
- Speed skating

== Venues ==
Events were held in and just outside of Lake Placid.

- Mt. Van Hoevenberg Olympic Bobsled Run (bobsled, luge, skeleton)
- Olympic Center (opening ceremony, short track speedskating, figure skating)
- Lake Placid Olympic Ski Jumping Complex (ski jumping, cross-country skiing, Nordic combined)
- Whiteface Mountain (alpine skiing, men's downhill, snowboarding)

== Participating nations ==
The following nations were invited to the games:

- AUS
- BLR
- CAN
- CHN
- CZE
- FIN
- FRA
- GER
- GBR
- ITA
- JPN
- MEX
- NOR
- RUS
- SLO
- KOR
- ESP
- SWE
- SUI
- USA
