= Whiteface Mountain =

Mountain in New York, United States

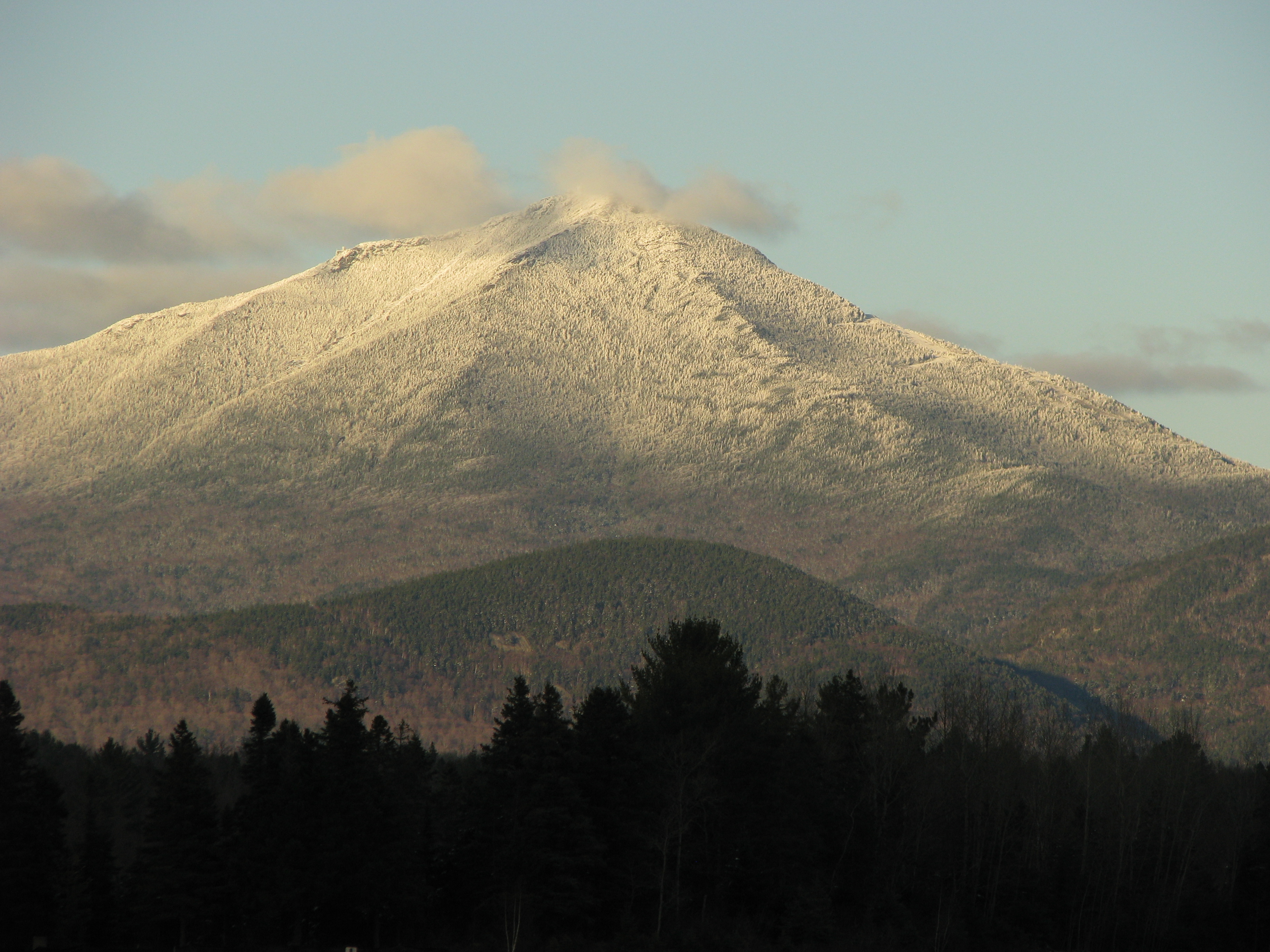
- Whiteface Mountain

Highest point
- Elevation: 4,867 ft (1,483 m) NGVD 29
- Listing: Adirondack High Peaks 5th
- Coordinates: 44°21′57″N 73°54′10″W

Naming
- Native name: Algonquin: Wa-ho-par-te-nie; Mohawk: Thei-a-no-gu-en

Geography
- Location within New York Location within the United States
- Location: Wilmington, New York, U.S.
- Parent range: Adirondacks
- Topo map: USGS Lake Placid

Climbing
- First ascent: 1814 by John Richards and party (Note: According to Russell Carson, earlier ascents were known but not recorded with enough detail to know when they occurred or who was involved.)
- Easiest route: road

Whiteface Mountain is the fifth-highest mountain in the U.S. state of New York, and one of the High Peaks of the Adirondack Mountains, located in the town of Wilmington in Essex County. Set apart from most of the other High Peaks, the summit offers a 360-degree view of the Adirondacks and clear-day glimpses of Vermont and Canada, where Montreal can be seen on a very clear day.

Because of its relative isolation, the mountain is exposed to prevailing winds from the west and frequently capped with snow and ice, making it an area of interest to meteorologists. Weather data has been collected on the summit since 1937. The mountain's east slope is home to a major ski area which boasts the greatest vertical drop east of the Rockies, and which hosted the alpine skiing competitions of the 1980 Winter Olympics.

Unique among the High Peaks, Whiteface features a developed summit and seasonal accessibility by motor vehicle. The Whiteface Veterans Memorial Highway (New York State Route 431) reaches a parking area at an elevation shortly below the summit, with the remaining distance covered by tunnel and elevator. The peak can also be reached on two hiking trails.

== Geography ==
Whiteface Mountain is located in the town of Wilmington, in Essex County, New York, in the Wilmington Wild Forest of the New York Forest Preserve. It is the fifth-highest mountain in New York, with an elevation of 4,867 feet (1,483 m). Except for nearby Esther Mountain, the mountain is over 10 miles (16 km) from the other Adirondack High Peaks. This isolation offers impressive views in all directions from the summit, which attracts many tourists. On clear days, Lake Placid and the other High Peaks can be seen to the south and west, Lake Champlain and Vermont can be seen to the east, and Montreal can be seen to the north. The top 300 feet (91 m) of the mountain are above the treeline.

=== Geology ===
Whiteface Mountain is primarily composed of gabbroic anorthosite, a white igneous rock which has been exposed near the summit and along the slopes where landslides have occurred. The white rock, and presence of rime ice at the summit for ten months of the year, are inspirations for the contemporary name of Whiteface, and likely also for indigenous names, including the Algonquin name Wa-ho-par-te-nie, which has been translated as "it is white", and the Mohawk name Thei-a-no-gu-en, which has been translated as "white head". (Note: The name Thei-a-no-gu-en was shared with Mohawk Chief Hendrick Theyanoguin, who was named on account of the whiteness of his scalp.)

Like the surrounding Adirondack region, Whiteface Mountain was covered by large glaciers during the most recent ice ages, which left prominent features on the mountain's slopes. The north, west, and east faces of the mountain are covered with prominent cirques separated by arêtes. One arête is now occupied by the hiking trail from the end of the Veterans Memorial Highway to the summit, while another is used by the Wilmington Trail. A long rock slide on the Southern face of the mountain, known as the Lake Placid slide, was used as an early trail to the summit.

== Climate ==
Whiteface Mountain has a Humid Continental (or hemiboreal) Climate (Dfb) according to the Köppen climate classification, with severely cold, snowy winters and cool to mild wet summers. The average snowfall at Whiteface Mountain is 190 inches per year, and the mountain trails are serviced by additional snowmaking. During the 2016–2017 season Whiteface boasted a record-setting 281 inches of natural snowfall. During an unprecedented arctic blast on February 4, 2023, the temperature fell to a record low of −40.2 °F (−40.1 °C) and a record wind speed of 121 miles per hour (195 km/h) was recorded.

Due to its bare summit and isolation from other mountains, Whiteface is exposed to westerly winds, which makes it an ideal location for meteorological studies. Weather observations have been recorded at the peak since 1937, when New York University and RPI established a meteorological station. Since 1957, data has been collected by the University at Albany's Atmospheric Sciences Research Center (ASRC) at the Whiteface Mountain Field Station.

Climate data for Whiteface Mountain, New York (1937–1946 normals, extremes 1937–1946)
Month	Jan	Feb	Mar	Apr	May	Jun	Jul	Aug	Sep	Oct	Nov	Dec	Year
Record high °F (°C)	42 (6)	41 (5)	63 (17)	69 (21)	73 (23)	79 (26)	78 (26)	78 (26)	75 (24)	69 (21)	57 (14)	52 (11)	79 (26)
Mean daily maximum °F (°C)	16.3 (−8.7)	17.8 (−7.9)	26.3 (−3.2)	36.3 (2.4)	50.9 (10.5)	59.6 (15.3)	62.7 (17.1)	59.9 (15.5)	53.9 (12.2)	42.1 (5.6)	30.9 (−0.6)	20.0 (−6.7)	39.7 (4.3)
Daily mean °F (°C)	7.5 (−13.6)	8.4 (−13.1)	17.5 (−8.1)	28.2 (−2.1)	42.6 (5.9)	51.4 (10.8)	55.3 (12.9)	53.1 (11.7)	46.1 (7.8)	33.6 (0.9)	23.5 (−4.7)	11.4 (−11.4)	31.6 (−0.3)
Mean daily minimum °F (°C)	−1.8 (−18.8)	−1.1 (−18.4)	8.7 (−12.9)	20.1 (−6.6)	34.2 (1.2)	43.2 (6.2)	47.9 (8.8)	46.0 (7.8)	38.3 (3.5)	27.1 (−2.7)	16.0 (−8.9)	3.0 (−16.1)	23.5 (−4.7)
Record low °F (°C)	−36 (−38)	−40 (−40)	−35 (−37)	−18 (−28)	9 (−13)	16 (−9)	28 (−2)	28 (−2)	16 (−9)	6 (−14)	−10 (−23)	−34 (−37)	−40 (−40)
Average precipitation inches (mm)	4.11 (104)	3.76 (96)	3.27 (83)	4.26 (108)	3.84 (98)	3.26 (83)	4.20 (107)	3.56 (90)	4.48 (114)	3.71 (94)	4.08 (104)	4.27 (108)	46.80 (1,189)
Average snowfall inches (cm)	27.0 (69)	29.7 (75)	19.2 (49)	11.4 (29)	1.1 (2.8)	0.0 (0.0)	0.0 (0.0)	0.0 (0.0)	0.2 (0.51)	10.1 (26)	23.2 (59)	17.8 (45)	139.7 (355.31)
Source: Northern Regional Climate Center

== Whiteface Mountain Ski Area ==
Whiteface Mountain Ski Area
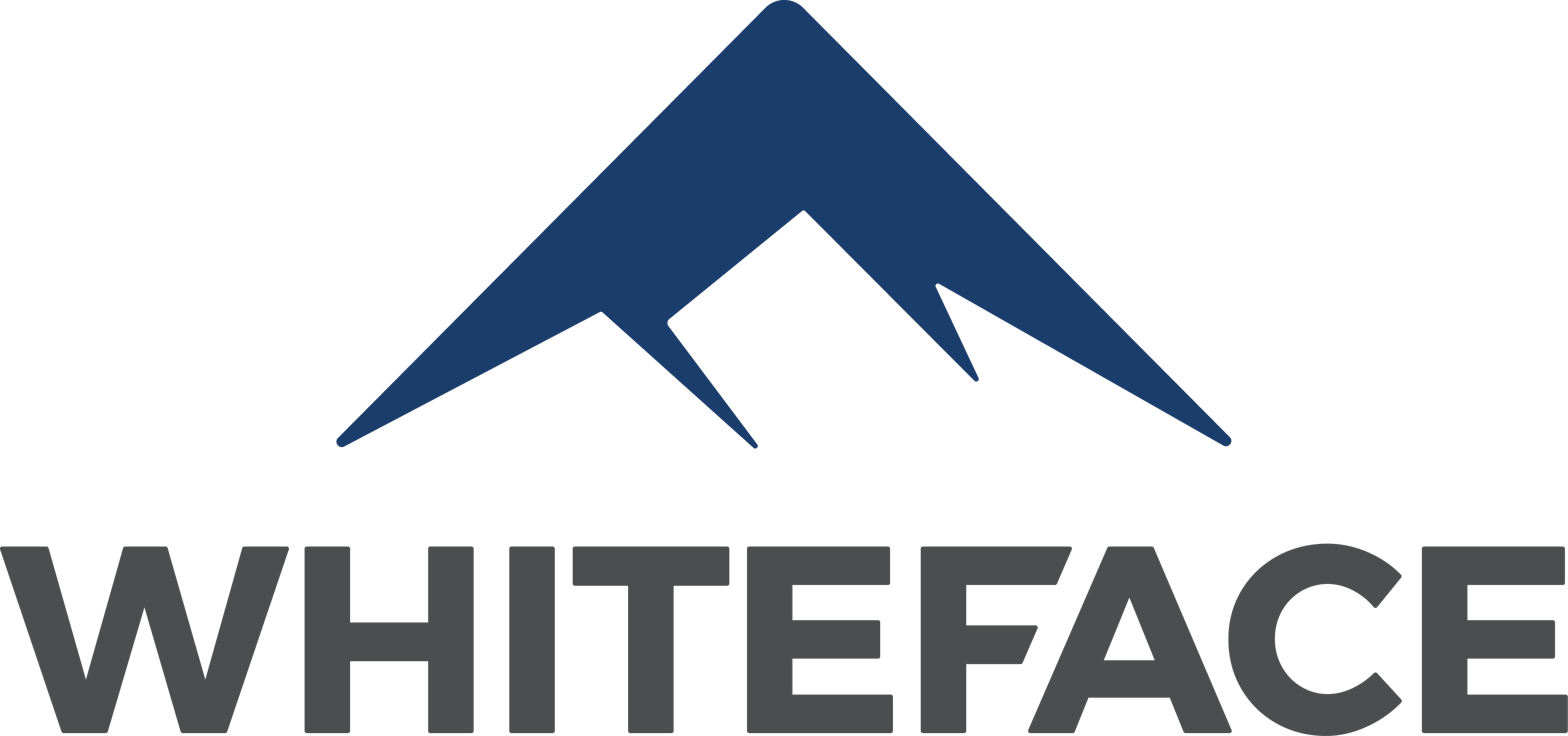

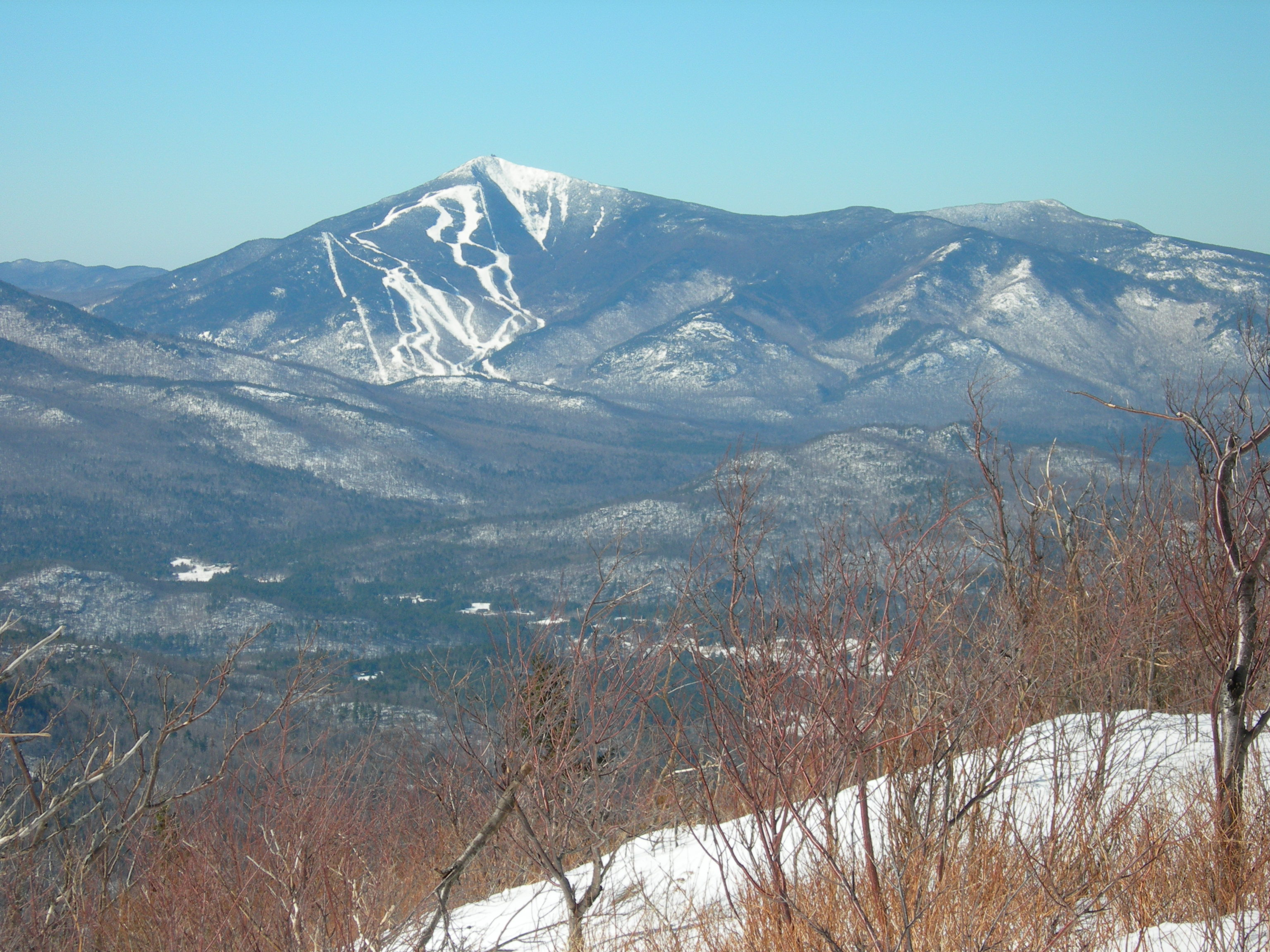
- Whiteface Mountain Ski Area in 2006
- Interactive map of Whiteface Mountain Ski Area
- Location: Wilmington, New York, U.S.
- Nearest city: Lake Placid – 13 miles (21 km)
- Coordinates: 44°21′57″N 73°54′10″W
- Vertical: 3,166 ft (965 m) (lift-served); 3,430 ft (1,045 m)
- Top elevation: 4,386 ft (1,337 m) (lift-served); 4,650 ft (1,417 m)
- Base elevation: 1,220 ft (372 m)
- Skiable area: 299 acres (121 ha)
- Trails: 94 total – 24% easiest – 46% more difficult – 30% most difficult
- Lift system: 1 gondola 9 chairlifts 1 conveyor lift
- Terrain parks: 7
- Snowfall: 190 in (480 cm)
- Snowmaking: Yes
- Night skiing: No
- Website: whiteface.com

Whiteface ski area, opened in 1960, is run by the Olympic Regional Development Authority. It was a venue of the 1980 Winter Olympics, hosting all six of the alpine ski events. It was also used as a venue for the 2000 Goodwill Winter Games and for alpine skiing at the 2023 Winter World University Games.

Whiteface's ski area contains 94 trails stretching over 24 miles (39 km) on 299 acres (121 ha) of land. Whiteface's highest lift unloads at 4,386 feet (1,337 m), a vertical drop of 3,166 ft (965 m) to the base area at 1,220 ft (372 m). Its hike-to terrain, known as The Slides, is 264 ft (80 m) higher at 4,650 ft (1,417 m), providing Whiteface with the greatest continuous vertical drop in eastern North America at 3,430 feet (1,045 m). The Slides also provide an additional 35 acres (14 ha) of skiable area on off-piste double-black diamond terrain. The longest run available is the Wilmington Trail at 2.1 miles (3.4 km). Trails are accessible by one gondola, nine chairlifts, and two conveyor lifts. 99% of the trails have snowmaking coverage.

== History ==
The earliest recorded ascent of Whiteface was made by surveyor John Richards in 1814. It was the first mountain in the Adirondacks to attract attention from tourists, due to its proximity to Lake Placid, and by 1859 there was a trail to the summit from nearby Wilmington.

In July 1909, a fire lookout was established on the mountain. The original lookout was a pole frame structure with a canvas tent stretched over it. The shelter was later improved to a stone hut. In 1919, a 22-foot-tall (6.7 m) steel Aermotor tower was built on the mountain.

In the 1920s, the New York state government purchased 4,500 acres (1,800 hectares) of land on Whiteface Mountain from the Pardee family of Philadelphia and the J. J. Rogers Co. of Ausable Forks to add to the Forest Preserve. The Pardees gifted 4.1 acres (1.7 hectares) at the summit in 1929.

Construction of the Whiteface Mountain Veterans Memorial Highway and Whiteface Castle was conceived and initiated prior to the Great Depression and was funded entirely by the state of New York, though the timing of the projects led to a widespread belief that they were Depression-era public works projects arising from the New Deal. A necessary constitutional amendment to fund a toll road was passed in 1927, and construction began in 1929 under then-New York State Governor Franklin D. Roosevelt, eventually costing 1.25 million dollars (23 million in 2025 dollars). The highway officially opened July 20, 1935, and was dedicated to veterans of the Great War in a ceremony featuring Roosevelt, by then President, on September 14 of that year.

In 1941, New York voters approved funds for the construction of a ski area on Whiteface, which was built by the Whiteface Mountain Authority after World War II. The ski area, known as Marble Mountain, operated between 1948 and 1960. The slopes were regularly exposed to strong prevailing winds that would strip away snow and make skiing difficult or impossible. Because of the poor conditions, Marble Mountain was abandoned in favor of the modern ski area in 1957. The former base lodge of the ski slope is today used for additional meteorological observations by the Atmospheric Sciences Research Center.

Due to increased use of aerial fire detection, the fire tower was closed at the end of the 1970 fire lookout season. On May 23, 1972, the tower was removed by New York State Forest Rangers and Operations personnel, one of the first of many towers to be removed from Adirondack Mountains. The tower's historical sign remained on the mountain for an additional year. The sign was then removed and donated along with the tower to the Adirondack Museum at Blue Mountain Lake.

== Ascent routes ==
The Veterans Memorial Highway runs for 5 miles (8 km) up the slope of the mountain, terminating 300 feet (91 m) below the summit. The Highway is usually open to vehicles from May to October. Whiteface Castle, a cut stone and concrete structure built into the mountain, is at the end of the highway. From the adjacent parking lot there are two routes to the summit proper. The first route is the Stairway Ridge Trail, a footpath with handrails and intermittent concrete and stone steps approximately 0.2 miles (0.32 km) long. The second is a 426-foot (130 m) long tunnel into the core of the mountain. At the end of the tunnel is an elevator which rises to the summit.

Two hiking trails reach the summit, one from Wilmington and the other from Lake Placid and Connery Pond. The trail from Connery Pond begins at a parking lot on New York State Route 86 and proceeds to the summit, for an elevation gain of 3,232 feet (985 m). An alternative approach on this trail can be made by crossing Lake Placid by boat to Whiteface Landing, which intersects with the trail 2.7 miles (4.3 km) from the trailhead, and hiking the remaining 3.5 miles (5.6 km) to the summit. The Wilmington Trail begins on the Veterans Memorial Highway and is 5.2 miles (8.4 km) to the summit, for an elevation gain of 3,620 feet (1,100 m). This trail intersects with an unmarked path to the summit of nearby Esther Mountain 3.4 miles (5.5 km) from the trailhead, and also passes by ski trails and lifts. The Wilmington Trail can also be reached from the Marble Mountain Trail, which begins at another parking lot on New York State Route 86. The two trails intersect 1.8 miles (2.9 km) from the Marble Mountain trailhead and 1.3 miles (2.1 km) from the Wilmington trailhead, adding 0.5 miles (0.80 km) to the total length of the route to Whiteface.

== Whiteface Mountain Field Station ==
Whiteface Mountain Field Station
- Established: 1970
- Director: Dr. Sara Lance
- Location: New York, United States; 44.366° N, 73.903° W
- Timezone: EST (UTC-5)
- Affiliations: University at Albany
- Operating agency: Atmospheric Sciences Research Center
- Website: https://whiteface.asrc.albany.edu/

The Atmospheric Sciences Research Center at the University at Albany, in cooperation with the NYS Department of Environmental Conservation, conducts atmospheric monitoring and atmospheric research at the Whiteface Mountain (WFM) Field Station, which includes two fixed locations on WFM: The base site at 2016 ft elevation, and the summit site above tree line at 4867 ft elevation. Many of the same measurements are obtained at both the base and summit sites, including carbon monoxide, nitrogen oxides, sulfur dioxide, ozone, methane and black carbon measurements. Measurements captured only at the WFM summit include: cloud water chemistry and ulftrafine particles, while measurements captured only at the WFM base include volatile organic compounds, PM_{2.5} mass and chemical composition, and precipitation chemistry. Weather monitoring is also conducted at WFM, including a NYS Mesonet station at the WFM base.

The WFM summit sits within clouds ~30-60% of the time during the summer months (June through September), making it an ideal location to study processes occurring within clouds, without the considerable expense of airborne platforms. Over the past decade, the focus of cloud chemistry research at WFM has shifted away from acid rain and associated sulfate aerosol pollution (which were greatly ameliorated through government policies like the Clean Air Act) to address other emerging trends, including the increasing abundance of organic compounds and growing influence of wildfire smoke on air quality and cloud chemistry.

== Gallery ==
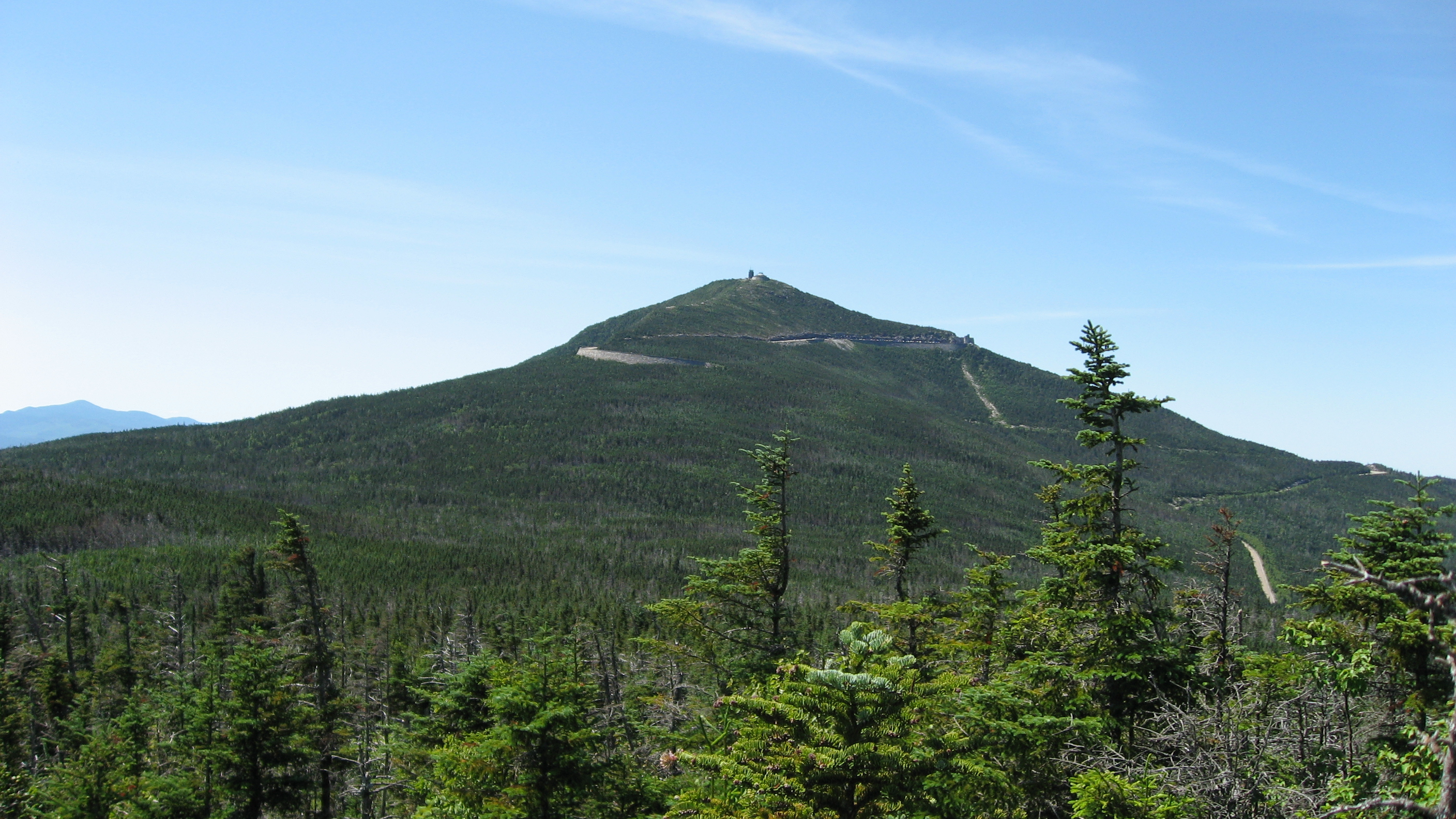
Whiteface Mountain and the Veterans Memorial Highway as seen from Esther Mountain

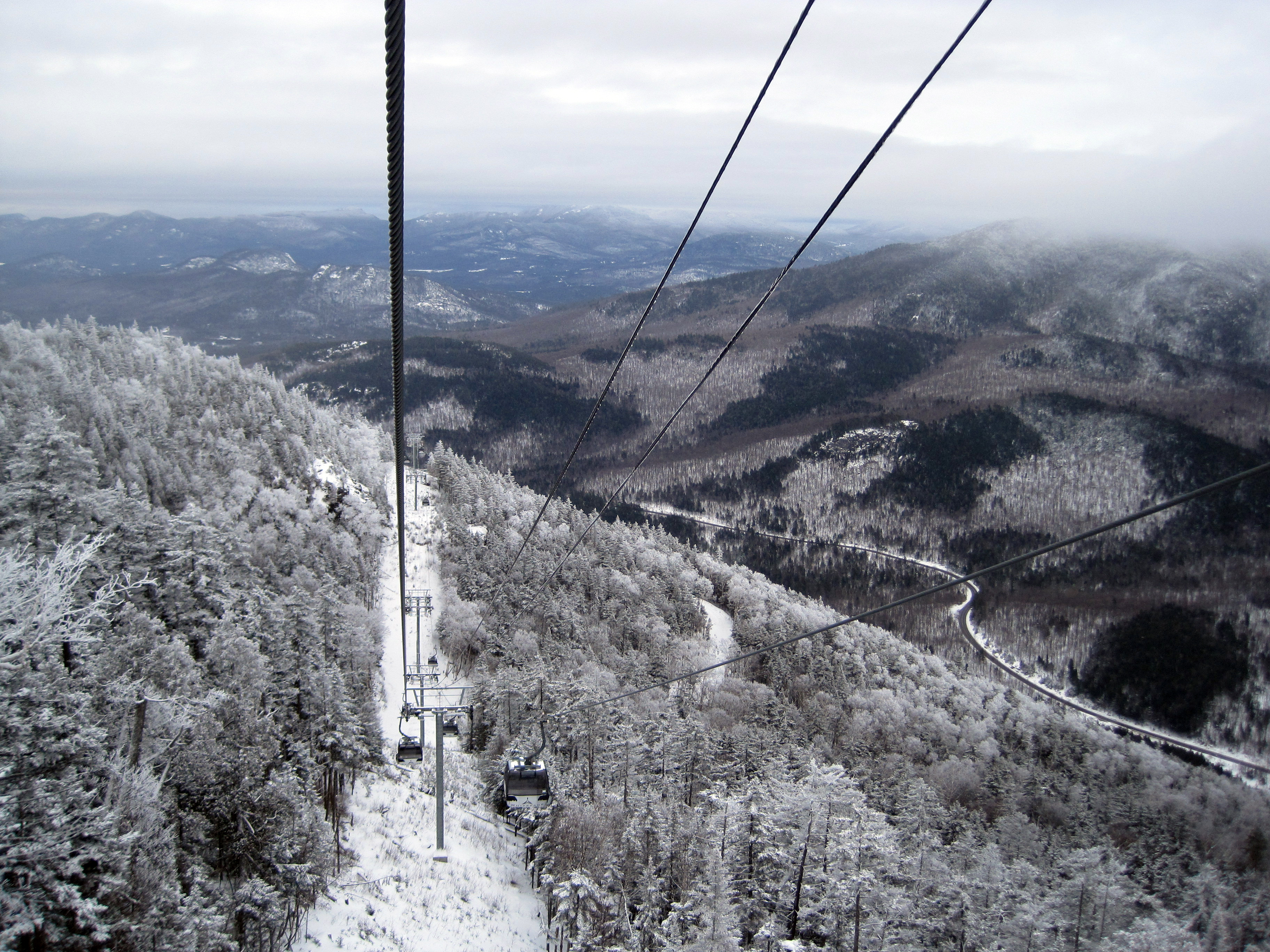
View from the Cloudsplitter Gondola on the way to the summit of Little Whiteface

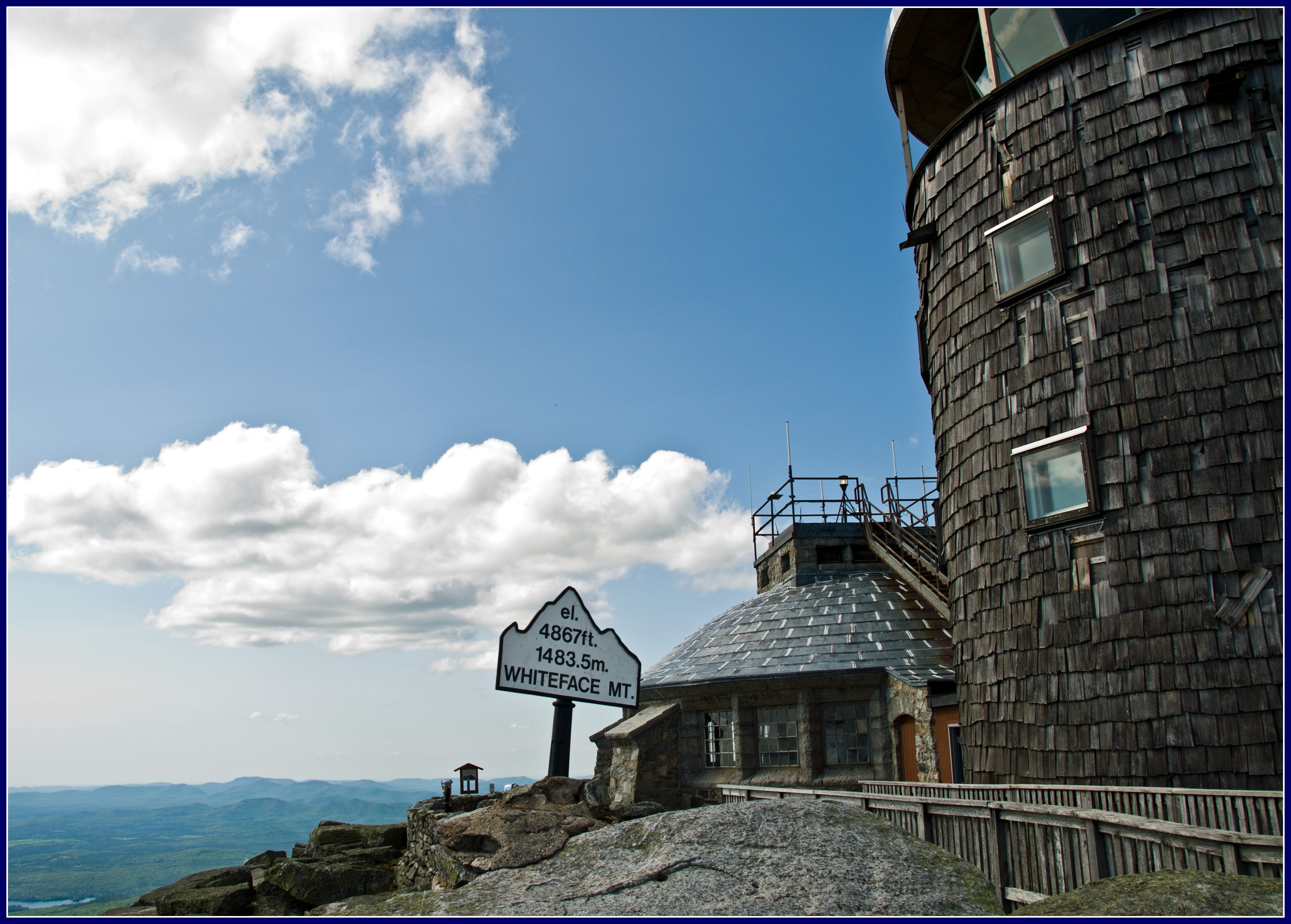
The meteorological station at the summit of Whiteface Mountain

Whiteface Mountain Summit Field Station above cloud in Spring of 2020, highlighting atmospheric instruments

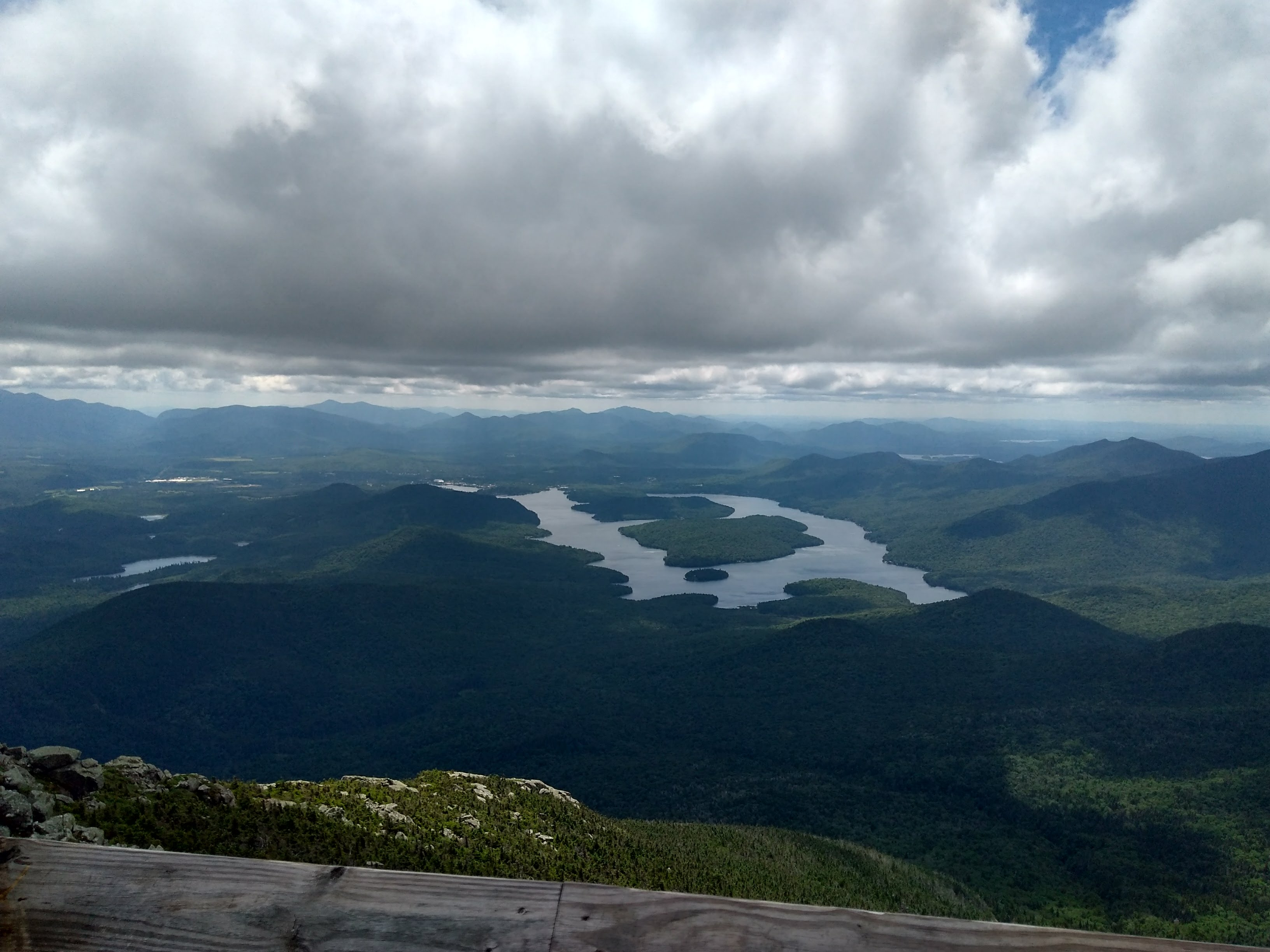
A view of nearby Lake Placid from the summit of Whiteface Mountain

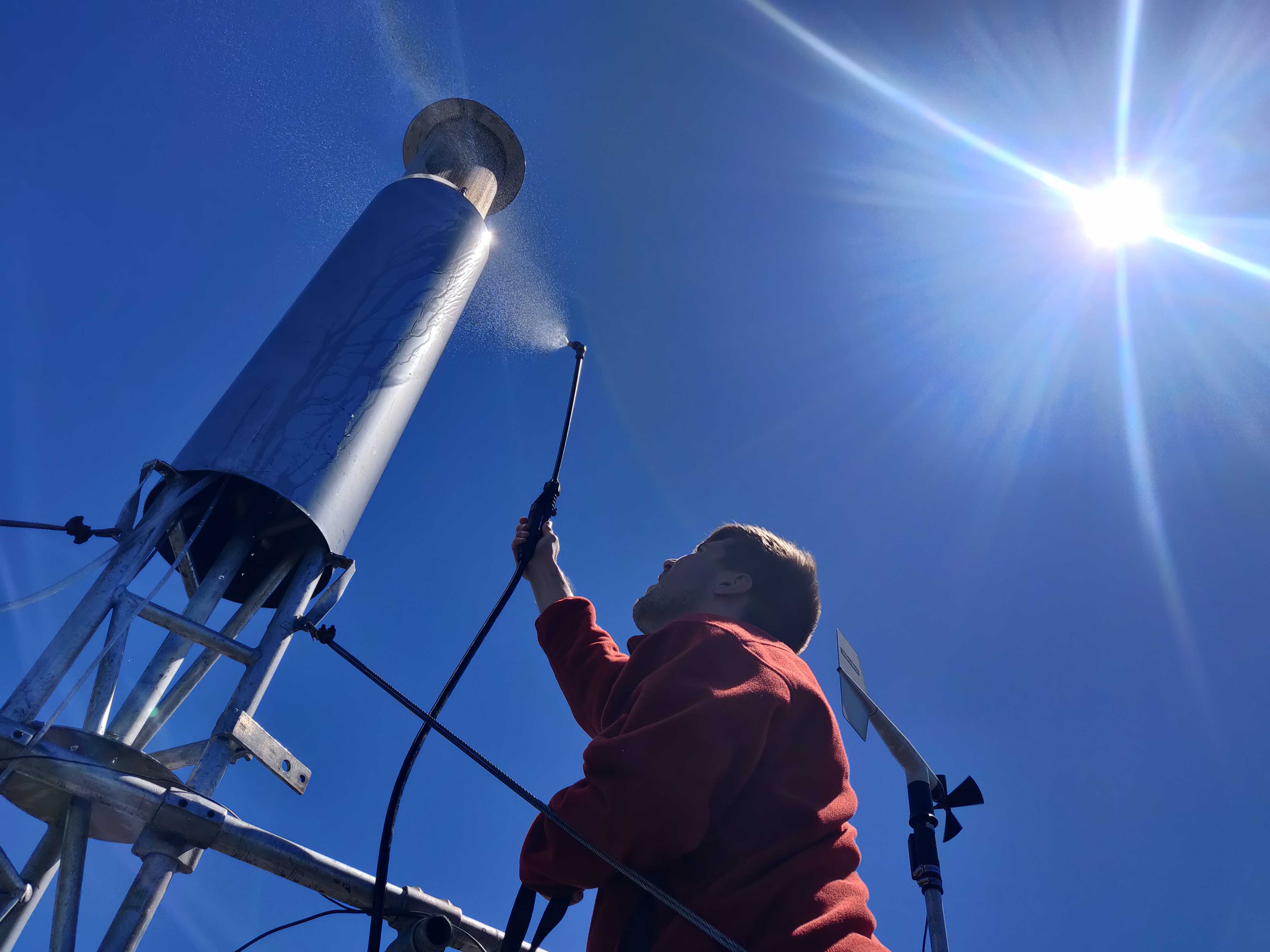
Spray test of the cloud water collector at the summit of WFM

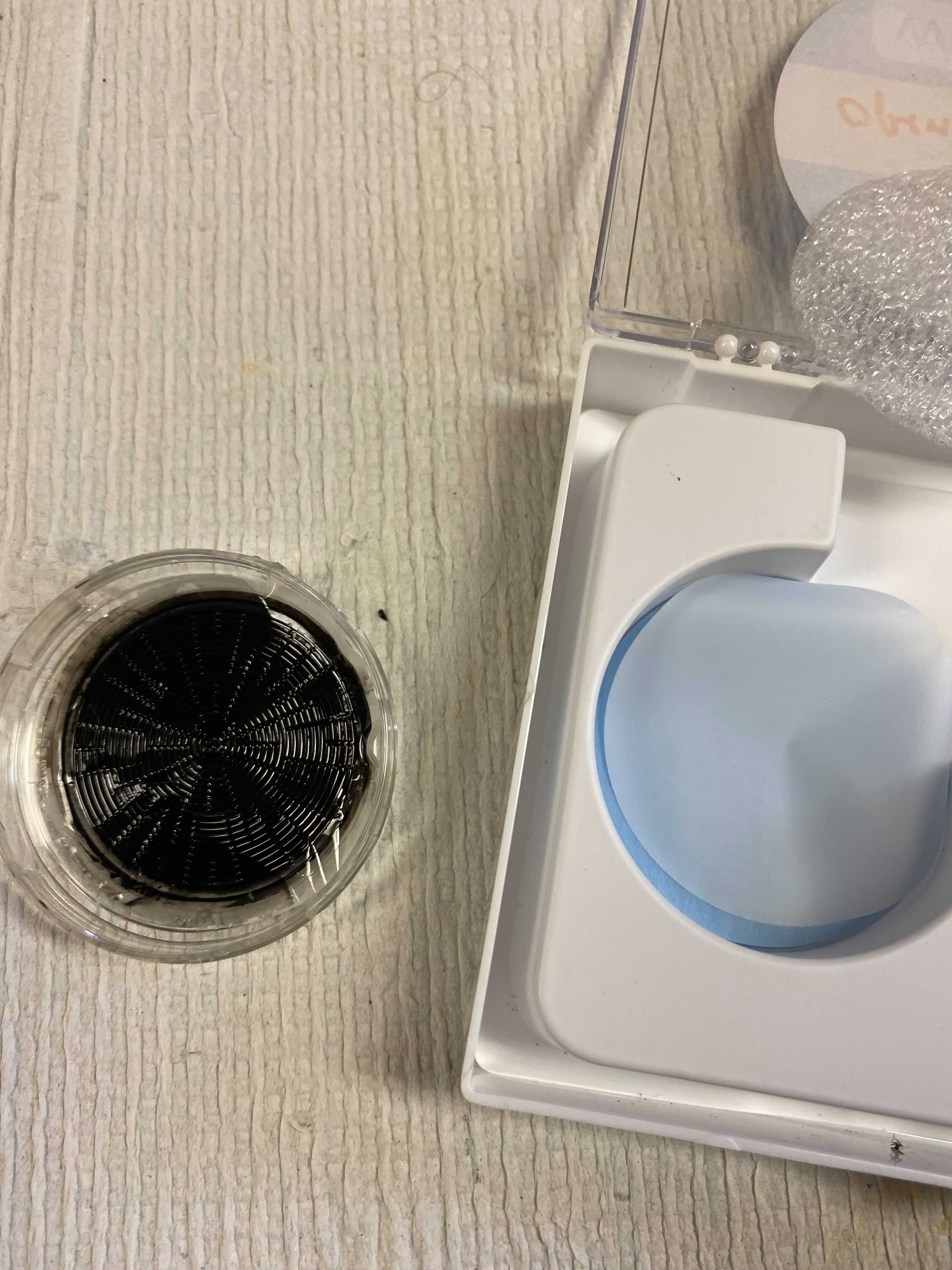
Cloud water filter after extreme smoke episode at WFM in July 2021
