= Wilmington, New York =

- Town
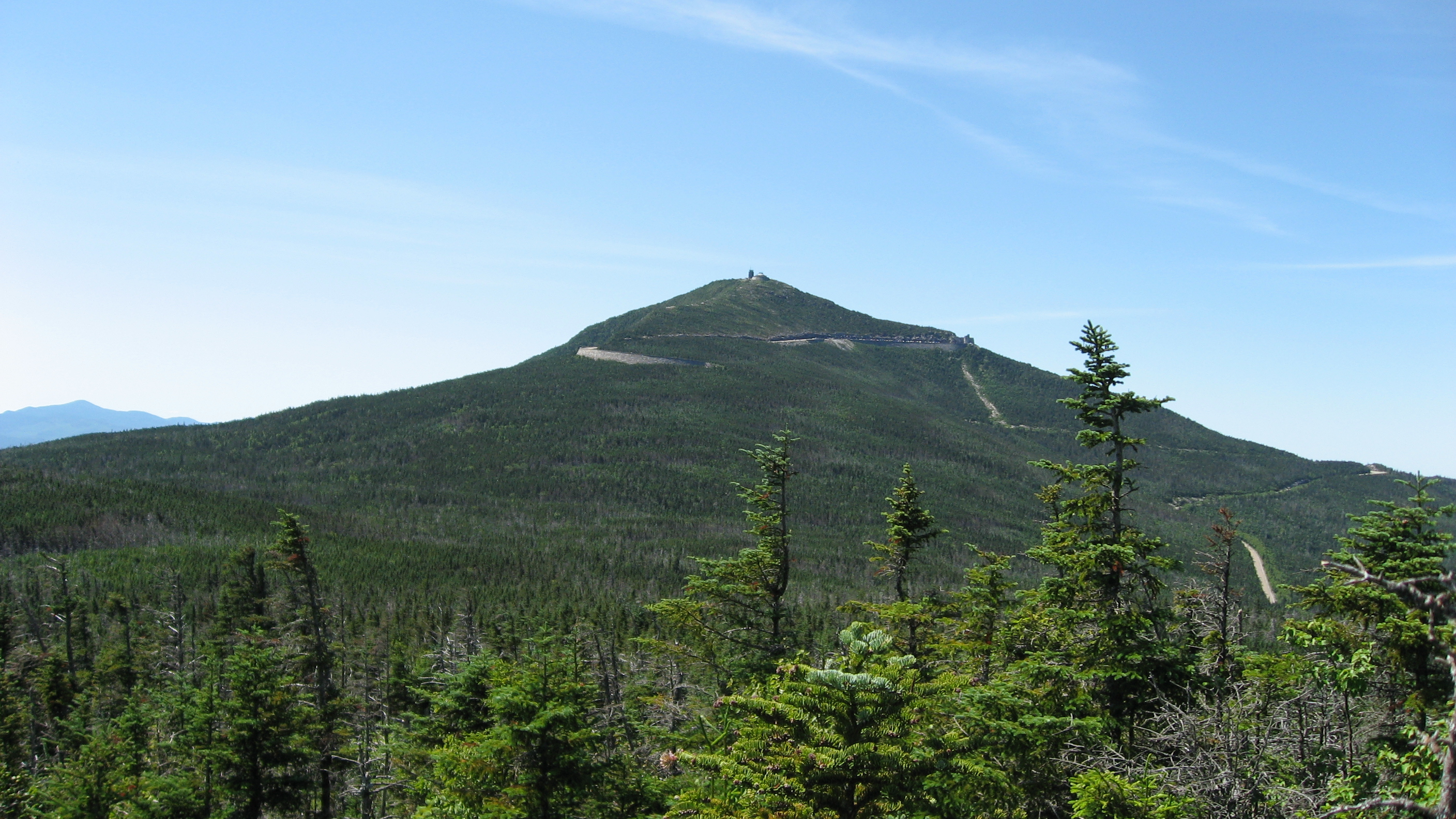
- Whiteface Mountain as seen from the Esther Mountain

- Location in Essex County and the state of New York
- Coordinates: 44°23′30″N 73°48′13″W
- Country: United States
- State: New York
- County: Essex

Government
  - Type: Town Council
  - Town Supervisor: Tim Follos
  - Town Council: Members' List: • Laura Dreissigacker Hooker; • Tim Follos (D); • Darin A. Forbes (R); • Tina Terry Preston (R)

Area
  - Total: 65.47 sq mi (169.57 km^{2})
  - Land: 65.22 sq mi (168.93 km^{2})
  - Water: 0.25 sq mi (0.64 km^{2})
- Elevation: 1,093 ft (333 m)

Population (2020)
  - Total: 1,139
  - Density: 12.9/sq mi (4.99/km^{2})
- Time zone: UTC-5 (Eastern (EST))
  - Summer (DST): UTC-4 (EDT)
- ZIP code: 12997
- Area code: 518
- FIPS code: 36-031-82315
- GNIS feature ID: 0979644
- Website: www.townofwilmington.org

Wilmington is a town in northern Essex County, New York, United States located within the Adirondack Park. As of 2020 the population was 1,139 with a projection of ~1,280 for 2023. The town is named after the town of Wilmington, Vermont.

Wilmington is on the county's northern border and is southwest of Plattsburgh. It is in the Whiteface region of the Adirondack Park.

== History ==
The town was first settled circa 1812.

The town was formed in 1821 from the town of Jay. At that time, the town was called "Dansville". In 1822, the name was changed, as suggested by a settler from Vermont, to "Wilmington" due to confusion with another "Dansville" in New York. In 1848, part of the town was partitioned off to form the town of St. Armand.

In the beginning of the 20th century, the tourist industry began to develop in the town. "Santa's Workshop", one of the first American theme parks for children, is located part way up the Whiteface Mountain Memorial Highway and was awarded its own Post Office—North Pole, New York. Whiteface Mountain (4,865 feet) Ski Center was the site of alpine events for the 1980 Winter Olympics.

== Geography ==
According to the United States Census Bureau, the town has a total area of 65.3 square miles (169.0 km^{2}), of which 65.3 square miles (169.0 km^{2}) is land and 0.2 square miles (0.6 km^{2}), or 0.36%, is water.

The northern town line is the border of Clinton County. At the northwestern corner is the corresponding corner of Franklin County.

The West Branch of the Ausable River flows northeastward through the center of the town.

New York State Route 431, an east–west highway known as Whiteface Mountain Memorial Highway, intersects New York State Route 86, a north–south highway, in Wilmington village.

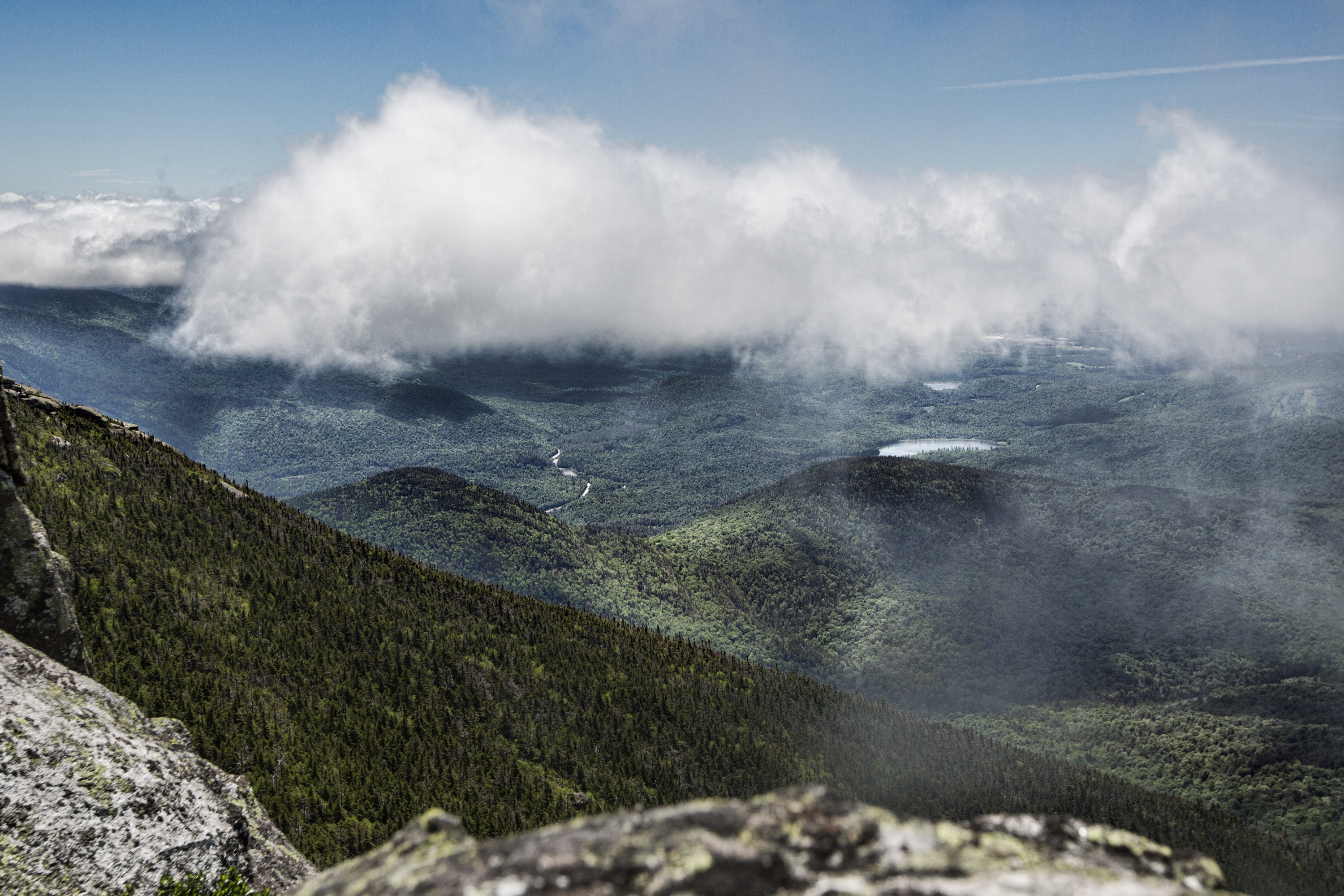
Whiteface Mountain, Wilmington, United States

== Demographics ==
Historical population
Census	Pop.	Note	%±
1830	695		—
1840	928		33.5%
1850	1,218		31.3%
1860	861		−29.3%
1870	794		−7.8%
1880	899		13.2%
1890	678		−24.6%
1900	634		−6.5%
1910	573		−9.6%
1920	545		−4.9%
1930	567		4.0%
1940	737		30.0%
1950	574		−22.1%
1960	683		19.0%
1970	777		13.8%
1980	1,051		35.3%
1990	1,020		−2.9%
2000	1,131		10.9%
2010	1,253		10.8%
2020	1,139		−9.1%
U.S. Decennial Census

At the 2020 census, there were 843 people and 417 households residing in the town. The population density was 17.4 inhabitants per square mile (6.7/km^{2}). There were 616 housing units at an average density of 11.3 per square mile (4.4/km^{2}). The racial makeup of the town was 98.59% White, 0.09% African American, 0.35% Native American, 0.09% Asian, 0.18% from other races, and 0.71% from two or more races. Hispanic or Latino of any race were 0.62% of the population.

There were 460 households, of which 35.0% had children under the age of 18 living with them, 53.0% were married couples living together, 8.7% had a female householder with no husband present, and 33.7% were non-families. 27.4% of all households were made up of individuals, and 10.9% had someone living alone who was 65 years of age or older. The average household size was 2.46 and the average family size was 3.01.

27.7% of the population were under the age of 18, 5.9% from 18 to 24, 29.2% from 25 to 44, 23.7% from 45 to 64, and 13.5% who were 65 years of age or older. The median age was 36 years. For every 100 females, there were 97.0 males. For every 100 females age 18 and over, there were 96.6 males.

The median household income was $34,432 and the median family income was $43,077. Males had a median income of $27,604 and females $21,328. The per capita income was $18,052. About 6.6% of families and 10.0% of the population were below the poverty line, including 11.3% of those under age 18 and 4.7% of those age 65 or over.

== Communities and locations in Wilmington ==
- Haselton – A hamlet in the northeastern part of the town on County Road 12 and the Ausable River.
- High Falls Gorge – A location on NY 86, south of Wilmington village.
- North Pole – A community and theme park (Santa's Workshop) northwest of Wilmington village on NY 431.
- Wilmington – The hamlet of Wilmington is at the junction of Routes NY-86 and NY-431 and the Au Sable River, near the town's center. The community is a resort and skiing center.

== See also ==
- Lake Placid, New York
