= Esther Mountain =

Mountain in New York, United States

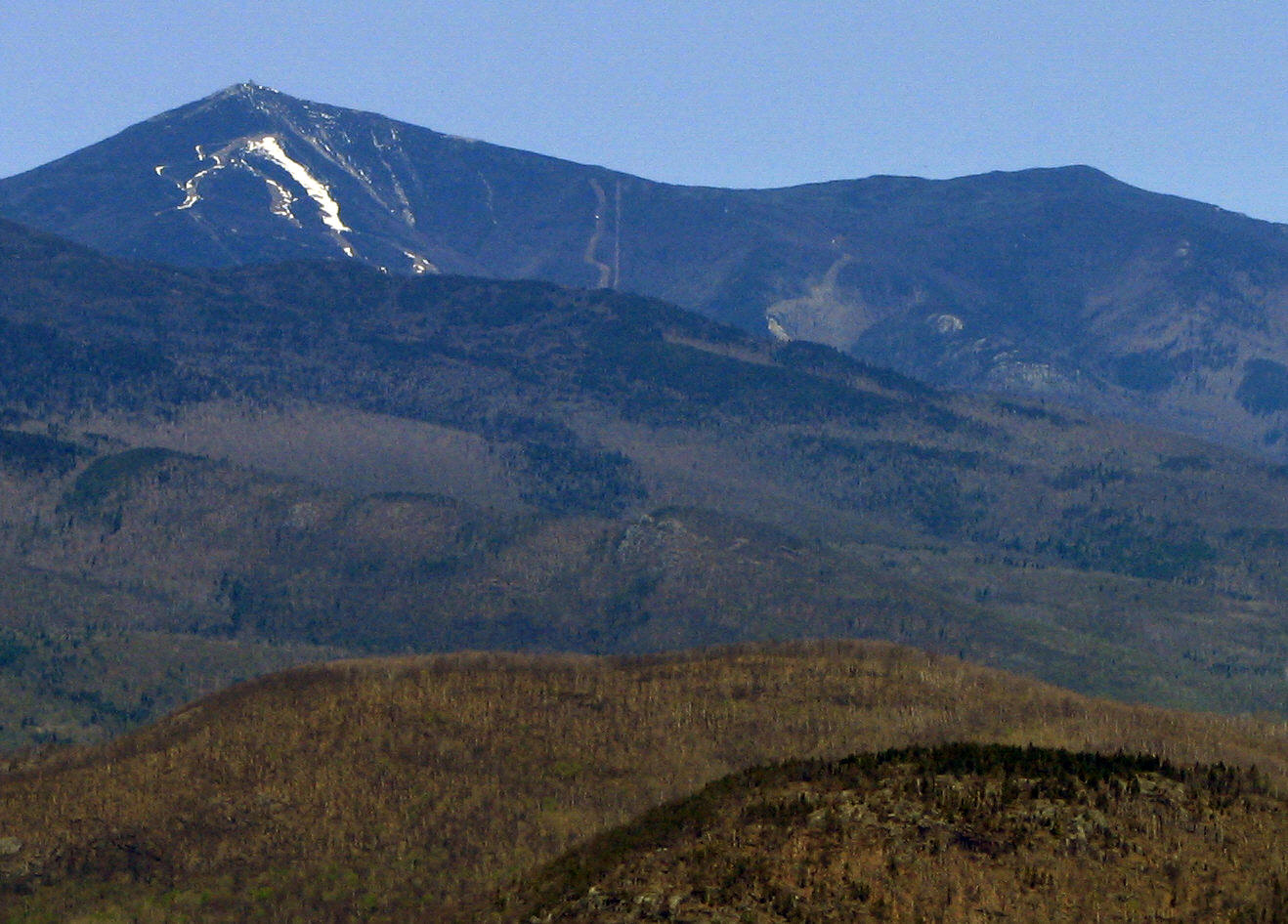
- Whiteface (left), Esther (right), from Hurricane

Highest point
- Elevation: 4,240 ft (1,290 m) NGVD 29
- Listing: Adirondack High Peaks 28th
- Coordinates: 44°23′13″N 73°53′24″W

Geography
- Location within New York Adirondack Park Location within the United States
- Location: Wilmington, Essex County, New York, U.S.
- Parent range: Adirondack Mountains
- Topo map: USGS Wilmington

Climbing
- First ascent: 1839 by Esther McComb

Esther Mountain is a mountain in the Adirondacks in the U.S. state of New York. It is the 28th-highest of the Adirondack High Peaks, with an elevation of 4,240 feet (1,290 m). The mountain is located in the Wilmington Wild Forest in the town of Wilmington in Essex County. It is adjacent to Whiteface Mountain and is the northernmost of the High Peaks.

== History ==
The name Esther Mountain first appeared in print in 1865. It was named in honor of Esther McComb, who made the first recorded climb to the summit in 1839, at age 15; at the time she was attempting to climb Whiteface Mountain from the north. A tablet commemorating her ascent was placed at the summit of the mountain by the Adirondack Forty-Sixerss in 1939. It was the only High Peak named for a woman until 2014, when East Dix was renamed to Grace Peak.

== Hiking trails ==
The summit of Esther Mountain can be hiked to on the Wilmington Trail and an unmarked trail. The Wilmington Trail begins on the Whiteface Mountain Veterans Memorial Highway (NY 431) and continues to the summit of Whiteface Mountain. This trail intersects with the unmarked path to the summit of Esther Mountain 3.4 miles (5.5 km) from the trailhead. The summit is located 1.2 miles (1.9 km) from the intersection, for a total distance of 4.6 miles (7.4 km). The Wilmington Trail can also be reached from the Marble Mountain Trail, which begins at another parking lot on New York State Route 86. The two trails intersect 1.8 miles (2.9 km) from the Marble Mountain trailhead and 1.3 miles (2.1 km) from the Wilmington trailhead, adding 0.5 miles (0.80 km) to the total length of the route to Esther.

== Climate ==
Climate data for Esther Mountain 44.3806 N, 73.8939 W, Elevation: 3,917 ft (1,194 m) (1991–2020 normals)
Month	Jan	Feb	Mar	Apr	May	Jun	Jul	Aug	Sep	Oct	Nov	Dec	Year
Mean daily maximum °F (°C)	19.0 (−7.2)	21.1 (−6.1)	28.5 (−1.9)	44.3 (6.8)	56.9 (13.8)	65.3 (18.5)	69.6 (20.9)	68.3 (20.2)	62.5 (16.9)	49.8 (9.9)	34.4 (1.3)	24.5 (−4.2)	45.3 (7.4)
Daily mean °F (°C)	10.9 (−11.7)	12.7 (−10.7)	20.5 (−6.4)	34.4 (1.3)	47.4 (8.6)	56.5 (13.6)	61.2 (16.2)	59.8 (15.4)	53.5 (11.9)	41.2 (5.1)	27.6 (−2.4)	17.5 (−8.1)	36.9 (2.7)
Mean daily minimum °F (°C)	2.7 (−16.3)	4.3 (−15.4)	12.4 (−10.9)	24.5 (−4.2)	37.9 (3.3)	47.8 (8.8)	52.8 (11.6)	51.3 (10.7)	44.5 (6.9)	32.6 (0.3)	20.9 (−6.2)	10.4 (−12.0)	28.5 (−1.9)
Average precipitation inches (mm)	4.24 (108)	3.22 (82)	3.95 (100)	5.09 (129)	5.44 (138)	6.50 (165)	5.99 (152)	5.58 (142)	5.38 (137)	6.17 (157)	4.87 (124)	4.57 (116)	61 (1,550)
Source: PRISM Climate Group

== See also ==
- List of mountains in New York
- Northeast 111 4,000-footers
  - Adirondack Forty-sixers
