= Lake Placid, New York =

Village in New York State, United States

- Village
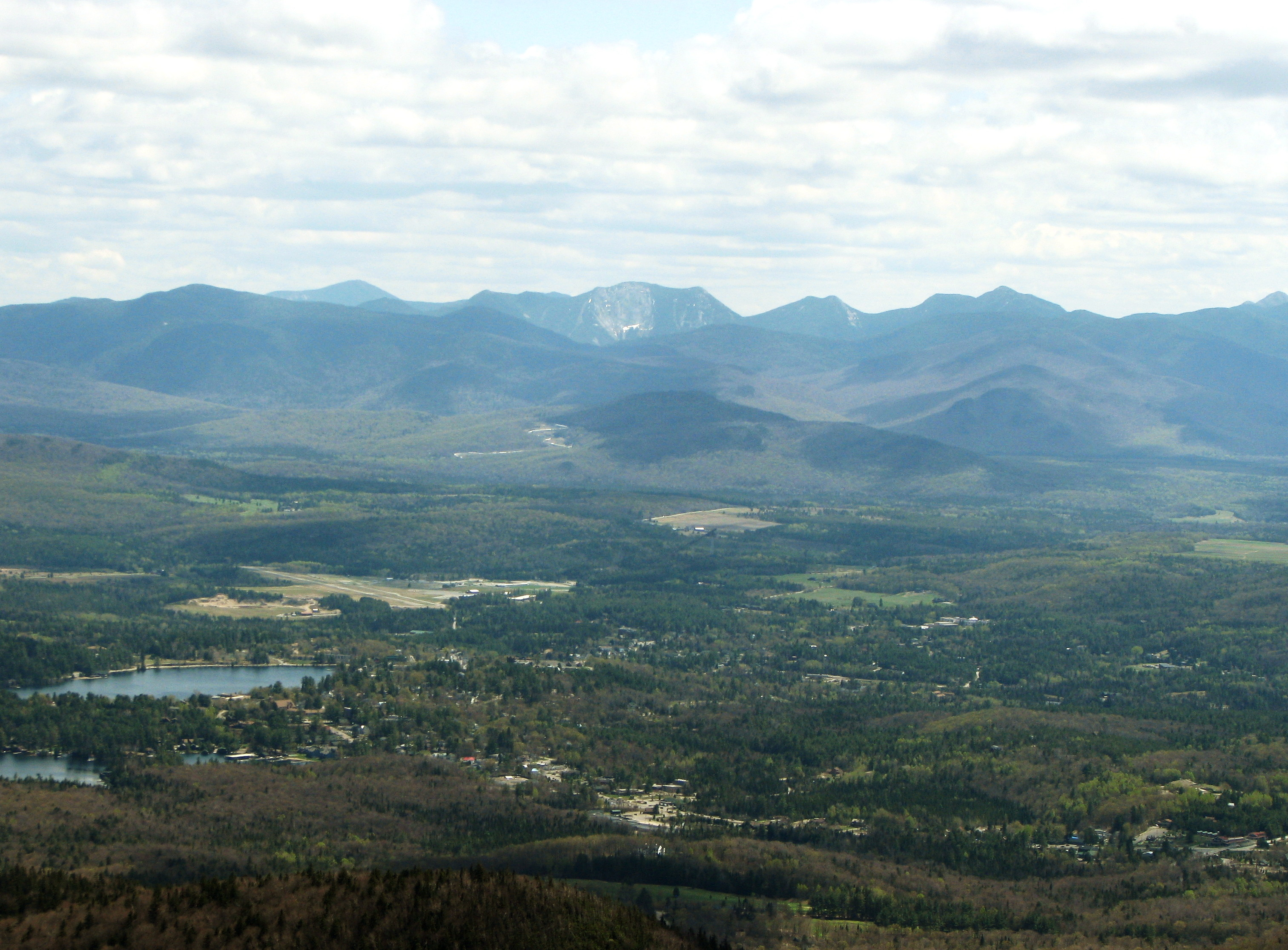
- Lake Placid from McKenzie Mountain
- Nickname: "The Olympic Village"
- Interactive map of Lake Placid, New York
- Location within New York Location within the United States
- Coordinates: 44°17′08″N 073°59′07″W
- Country: United States
- State: New York
- County: Essex
- Town: North Elba
- Established: 1700s

Government
  - Type: Council / Manager
  - Mayor: Art Devlin

Area
  - Total: 1.53 sq mi (3.97 km^{2})
  - Land: 1.36 sq mi (3.53 km^{2})
  - Water: 0.17 sq mi (0.45 km^{2}) 10.80%
- Elevation: 1,801 ft (549 m)

Population (2020)
  - Total: 2,205
  - Density: 1,619.9/sq mi (625.44/km^{2})
- Time zone: UTC-5 (Eastern (EST))
  - Summer (DST): UTC-4 (EDT)
- ZIP code: 12946
- Area code: 518
- FIPS code: 36-40761
- GNIS feature ID: 0954931
- Website: villageoflakeplacid.ny.gov

Lake Placid is a village in Essex County, New York, United States, within the Adirondack Mountains. Its population was 2,205 at the 2020 census. Lake Placid became known internationally for hosting the 1932 and the 1980 Winter Olympics. Lake Placid has also hosted the 1972 and 2023 Winter World University Games, as well as the 2000 Goodwill Winter Games. The village is near the center of the town of North Elba, 50 miles (80 km) southwest of Plattsburgh.

== History ==
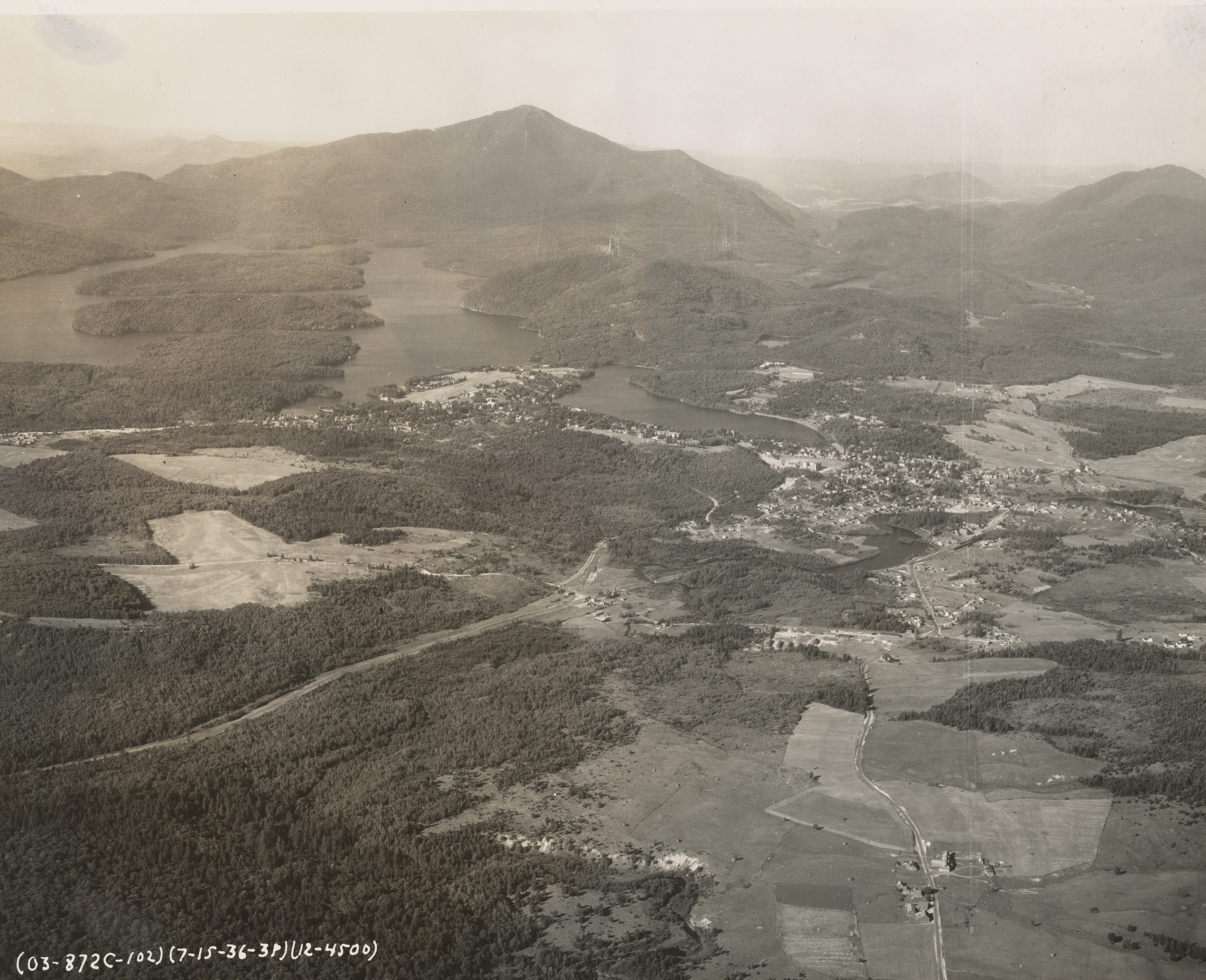
Lake Placid in 1936

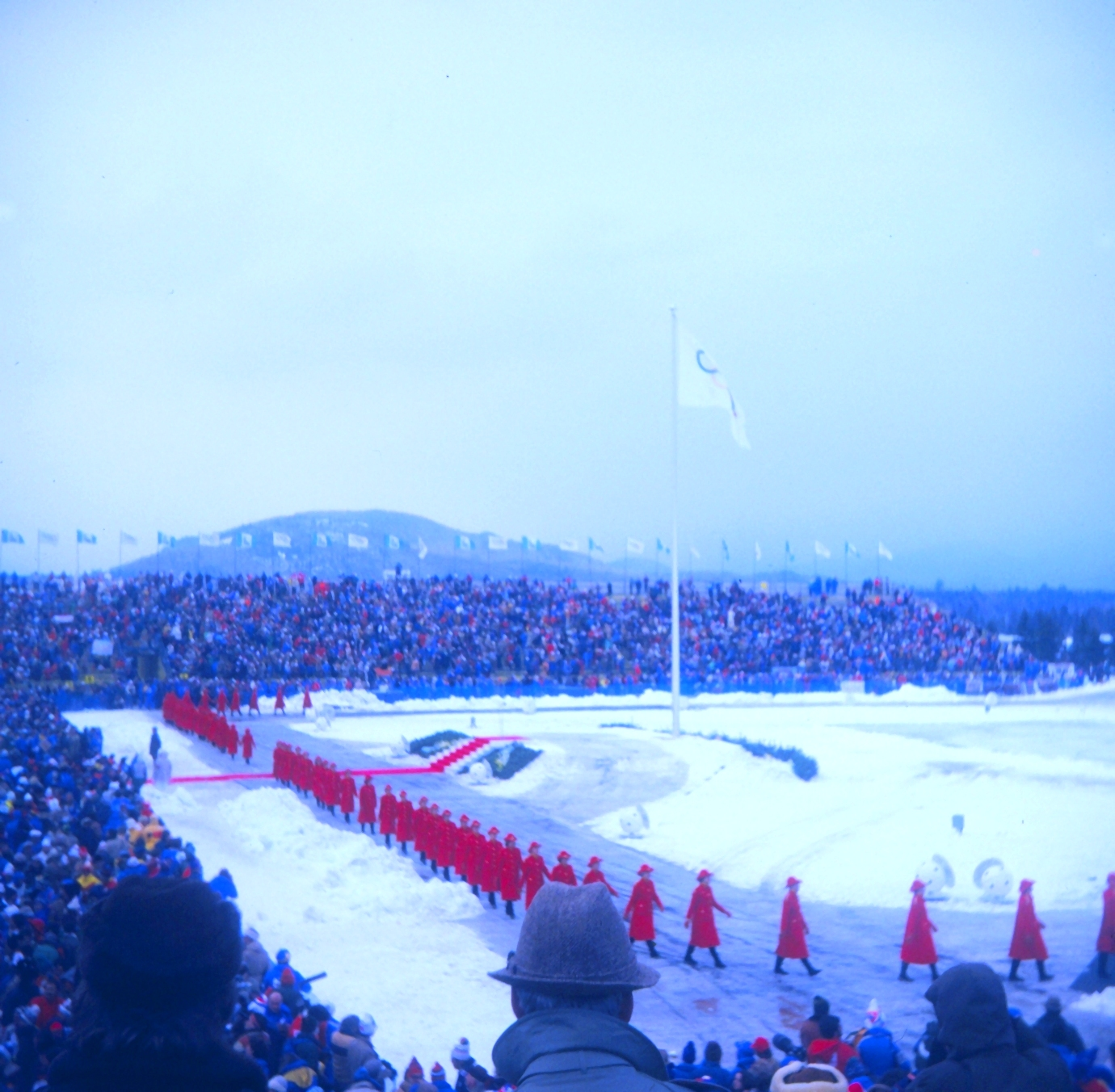
The Opening Ceremony of the 1980 Winter Olympics in Lake Placid.

Lake Placid was founded in the early 19th century to develop an iron ore mining operation. By 1840, the population of "North Elba" (four miles southeast of the present village, near where the road to the Adirondak Loj crosses the Ausable River), was six families. In 1845, the philanthropist Gerrit Smith arrived in North Elba and not only bought a great deal of land around the village but granted large tracts to former slaves. He reformed the land law and demonstrated his support of abolitionism.

The abolitionist John Brown heard about Smith's reforms and left his anti-slavery activities in Kansas to buy 244 acres (1.0 km^{2}) of land in North Elba. This parcel later became known as the "Freed Slave Utopian Experiment", Timbuctoo. Brown would become known for his raid on Harpers Ferry and his execution in 1859. Shortly before, John Brown asked to be buried on his farm, which remains preserved as the John Brown Farm State Historic Site.

As leisure time increased in the late 19th century, Lake Placid was discovered as a resort by the wealthy, drawn to the fashionable Lake Placid Club. Melvil Dewey, who invented the Dewey Decimal System, designed what was then called "Placid Park Club" in 1895. This inspired the village to change its name to Lake Placid, an incorporated village in 1900. Dewey kept the club open through the winter in 1905, which aided the development of winter sports in the area. It often hosted national conventions. Nearby Saranac Lake had hosted an international winter sporting event as early as 1889 and was used year-round by patients seeking treatment for tuberculosis at sanatoria. The fresh, clean mountain air was considered good for them and was a common treatment for tuberculosis.

George White, a businessman who also served as postmaster and town supervisor, built the White Opera House in 1895. The building still stands today on the banks of the Chubb River. It had seating for 500 persons.

As the dramatic surroundings became more known to residents of New York City, filmmakers including Harry Handworth started to use Lake Placid and its surroundings for shooting silent films around 1914. Many movies, among them News Parade, Summer Bachelors, The Avalanche, and Out of the Snows, were shot in the area.

By 1921, the Lake Placid area boasted a ski jump, speed skating venue, and ski association. In 1929, Godfrey Dewey, Melvil's son, convinced the International Olympic Committee (IOC) Lake Placid had the best winter sports facilities in the United States. The Lake Placid Club was the headquarters for the IOC for the 1932 and the 1980 Winter Olympics in Lake Placid.

The Club did not allow Jews or Catholics, but there were other hotels that catered to them. Especially during and after World War Two, many cosmopolitan refugees from Hitler's Germany and Austria spent their summers in Lake Placid. Main Street was filled with fashionable shops, albeit opened only during the season.

In addition to the John Brown Farm and Gravesite, the Mount Van Hoevenberg Olympic Bobsled Run, New York Central Railroad Adirondack Division Historic District, and United States Post Office are listed on the National Register of Historic Places.

== Geography ==
According to the United States Census Bureau, the village has a total area of 1.5 square miles (4.0 km^{2}), of which 1.4 square miles (3.6 km^{2}) is land and 0.15 square miles (0.4 km^{2}), or 10.79%, is water.

The village is located near the southern end of Lake Placid lake. More immediate to the village is Mirror Lake, which lies between the village and Lake Placid.

=== Climate ===
According to the Köppen climate classification system, Lake Placid has a warm-summer, humid continental climate (Dfb). Dfb climates are characterized by a least one month having an average mean temperature ≤ 32.0 °F (0.0 °C), at least four months with an average mean temperature ≥ 50.0 °F (10.0 °C), all months with an average mean temperature < 71.6 °F (22.0 °C) and no significant precipitation difference between seasons. Although most summer days are comfortably humid in Lake Placid, episodes of heat and high humidity can occur with heat index values > 90 °F (32 °C). Since 1897, the highest air temperature was 97 °F (36.1 °C). The average wettest month is June which corresponds with the annual peak in thunderstorm activity. During the winter months, the average annual extreme minimum air temperature is −24.5 °F (−31.4 °C), corresponding to hardiness zone 4. Since 1897, the coldest air temperature was −39 °F (−39.4 °C). Episodes of extreme cold and wind can occur with wind chill values < −50 °F (−46 °C). The average annual snowfall total is 104.1 inches (264 cm).

Climate data for Lake Placid, New York, 1991–2020 normals, extremes 1897–present
Month	Jan	Feb	Mar	Apr	May	Jun	Jul	Aug	Sep	Oct	Nov	Dec	Year
Record high °F (°C)	62 (17)	62 (17)	80 (27)	87 (31)	91 (33)	94 (34)	97 (36)	94 (34)	94 (34)	87 (31)	79 (26)	63 (17)	97 (36)
Mean maximum °F (°C)	50.0 (10.0)	50.9 (10.5)	59.9 (15.5)	73.4 (23.0)	83.0 (28.3)	86.7 (30.4)	87.4 (30.8)	85.8 (29.9)	83.2 (28.4)	75.0 (23.9)	62.7 (17.1)	51.9 (11.1)	89.5 (31.9)
Mean daily maximum °F (°C)	23.3 (−4.8)	27.3 (−2.6)	35.9 (2.2)	49.2 (9.6)	62.3 (16.8)	70.4 (21.3)	74.2 (23.4)	72.5 (22.5)	66.1 (18.9)	52.3 (11.3)	39.5 (4.2)	28.5 (−1.9)	50.1 (10.1)
Daily mean °F (°C)	14.9 (−9.5)	17.7 (−7.9)	26.0 (−3.3)	38.9 (3.8)	51.1 (10.6)	59.8 (15.4)	64.1 (17.8)	62.5 (16.9)	55.7 (13.2)	43.8 (6.6)	32.2 (0.1)	21.0 (−6.1)	40.6 (4.8)
Mean daily minimum °F (°C)	6.5 (−14.2)	8.1 (−13.3)	16.1 (−8.8)	28.5 (−1.9)	39.9 (4.4)	49.3 (9.6)	54.1 (12.3)	52.4 (11.3)	45.3 (7.4)	35.2 (1.8)	24.9 (−3.9)	13.6 (−10.2)	31.2 (−0.5)
Mean minimum °F (°C)	−21.2 (−29.6)	−16.6 (−27.0)	−6.9 (−21.6)	11.7 (−11.3)	24.7 (−4.1)	34.3 (1.3)	41.4 (5.2)	38.3 (3.5)	28.3 (−2.1)	19.1 (−7.2)	3.0 (−16.1)	−13.0 (−25.0)	−24.5 (−31.4)
Record low °F (°C)	−37 (−38)	−37 (−38)	−30 (−34)	−10 (−23)	17 (−8)	22 (−6)	31 (−1)	27 (−3)	18 (−8)	5 (−15)	−11 (−24)	−39 (−39)	−39 (−39)
Average precipitation inches (mm)	3.10 (79)	2.29 (58)	2.89 (73)	3.39 (86)	3.93 (100)	4.81 (122)	4.36 (111)	3.96 (101)	3.90 (99)	4.23 (107)	3.40 (86)	3.50 (89)	43.76 (1,111)
Average snowfall inches (cm)	21.0 (53)	21.0 (53)	18.9 (48)	7.8 (20)	0.5 (1.3)	0.0 (0.0)	0.0 (0.0)	0.0 (0.0)	0.0 (0.0)	2.6 (6.6)	9.6 (24)	22.7 (58)	104.1 (263.9)
Average extreme snow depth inches (cm)	15.6 (40)	18.0 (46)	15.4 (39)	7.6 (19)	0.3 (0.76)	0.0 (0.0)	0.0 (0.0)	0.0 (0.0)	0.0 (0.0)	1.0 (2.5)	6.1 (15)	11.5 (29)	23.3 (59)
Average precipitation days (≥ 0.01 in)	18.5	14.1	13.4	14.2	15.2	14.7	14.4	13.3	12.3	15.3	15.3	18.6	179.3
Average snowy days (≥ 0.1 in)	13.7	10.3	8.3	3.9	0.5	0.0	0.0	0.0	0.0	1.5	6.5	12.3	97.0
Source 1: NOAA
Source 2: National Weather Service

=== Ecology ===
According to the A. W. Kuchler U.S. potential natural vegetation types, Lake Placid would have a dominant vegetation type of Northern Hardwoods/Spruce (108) with a dominant vegetation form of Northern Hardwoods (23). The plant hardiness zone is 4a with an average annual extreme minimum air temperature of −27.1 °F (−32.8 °C). The spring bloom typically peaks on approximately May 12 and fall color usually peaks around October 1.

== Demographics ==
Historical population
Census	Pop.	Note	%±
1910	1,682		—
1920	2,099		24.8%
1930	2,930		39.6%
1940	3,136		7.0%
1950	2,999		−4.4%
1960	2,998		0.0%
1970	2,731		−8.9%
1980	2,490		−8.8%
1990	2,485		−0.2%
2000	2,638		6.2%
2010	2,521		−4.4%
2020	2,205		−12.5%
U.S. Decennial Census

=== 2020 census ===
As of the 2020 census, Lake Placid had a population of 2,205. The median age was 45.8 years. 13.7% of residents were under the age of 18 and 19.7% of residents were 65 years of age or older. For every 100 females there were 96.9 males, and for every 100 females age 18 and over there were 97.5 males age 18 and over.

100.0% of residents lived in urban areas, while 0.0% lived in rural areas.

There were 1,223 households in Lake Placid, of which 15.0% had children under the age of 18 living in them. Of all households, 29.0% were married-couple households, 28.8% were households with a male householder and no spouse or partner present, and 32.1% were households with a female householder and no spouse or partner present. About 50.9% of all households were made up of individuals and 18.3% had someone living alone who was 65 years of age or older.

There were 2,064 housing units, of which 40.7% were vacant. The homeowner vacancy rate was 5.0% and the rental vacancy rate was 11.6%.

Racial composition as of the 2020 census
Race	Number	Percent
White	2,051	93.0%
Black or African American	16	0.7%
American Indian and Alaska Native	0	0.0%
Asian	32	1.5%
Native Hawaiian and Other Pacific Islander	0	0.0%
Some other race	14	0.6%
Two or more races	92	4.2%
Hispanic or Latino (of any race)	36	1.6%

=== 2000 census ===
As of the census of 2000, there were 2,638 people, 1,303 households, and 604 families residing in the village. The population density was 1,913.2 inhabitants per square mile (738.7/km^{2}). There were 1,765 housing units at an average density of 1,280.1 per square mile (494.2/km^{2}). The racial makeup of the village was 95.75% White, 0.68% African American, 0.45% Native American, 0.91% Asian, 0.57% Pacific Islander, 0.19% from other races, and 1.44% from two or more races. Hispanic or Latino of any race were 0.91% of the population.

There were 1,303 households, of which 22.3% had children under the age of 18 living with them, 34.1% were married couples living together, 8.4% had a female householder with no husband present, and 53.6% were non-families. 45.7% of all households were made up of individuals, and 16.9% had someone living alone who was 65 years of age or older. The average household size was 2.02, and the average family size was 2.93.

The population was spread out, with 22.4% under the age of 18, 8.5% from 18 to 24, 33.2% from 25 to 44, 19.3% from 45 to 64, and 16.6% who were 65 years of age or older. The median age was 37 years. For every 100 females, there were 92.4 males. For every 100 females age 18 and over, there were 88.3 males.

The median income for a household in the village was $28,239, and the median income for a family was $43,042. Males had a median income of $26,585 versus $21,750 for females. The per capita income for the village was $18,507. About 8.5% of families and 13.2% of the population were below the poverty line, including 13.3% of those under age 18 and 17.8% of those age 65 or over.

== Arts and culture ==
There were three major hotels built in the 1870s, and many subsequent inns flourished. Among the most prominent hotels were: The Grand View Hotel, Stevens House, The Mirror Lake Inn, The Ruisseaumont Hotel, Northwoods Inn, Hotel Marcy, Searles House, and The Homestead. Some of them are still in business.

The Happy Hour Theatre, located directly on Mirror Lake, was the first movie house in Lake Placid. It was in business from 1911 to 1928. The Adirondack Theater Corporation bought it in the 1920s and also operated the newer Palace Theatre (opened in 1926) on the same street. Films were also shown several times a week at the Lake Placid Club, with the major film distributors delivering films via the Palace Theatre. In 1969, the Harbor Theatre opened near Holiday Harbor on the shores of Lake Placid and showed movies until 1986. The Palace is still operating at its original vintage setting on Main Street.

Lake Placid is home to the Lake Placid Sinfonietta, a professional summer chamber orchestra that has existed since 1917. Musicians associated with New York City's Greenwich House Music School summered in Lake Placid around 1920, as did the opera singers Marcella Sembrich and George Hamlin. Victor Herbert was the most famous musician to own a camp in town. The Lake Placid Club offered concerts and gala festivities for decades.

== Sports ==
=== Olympic Winter Games ===
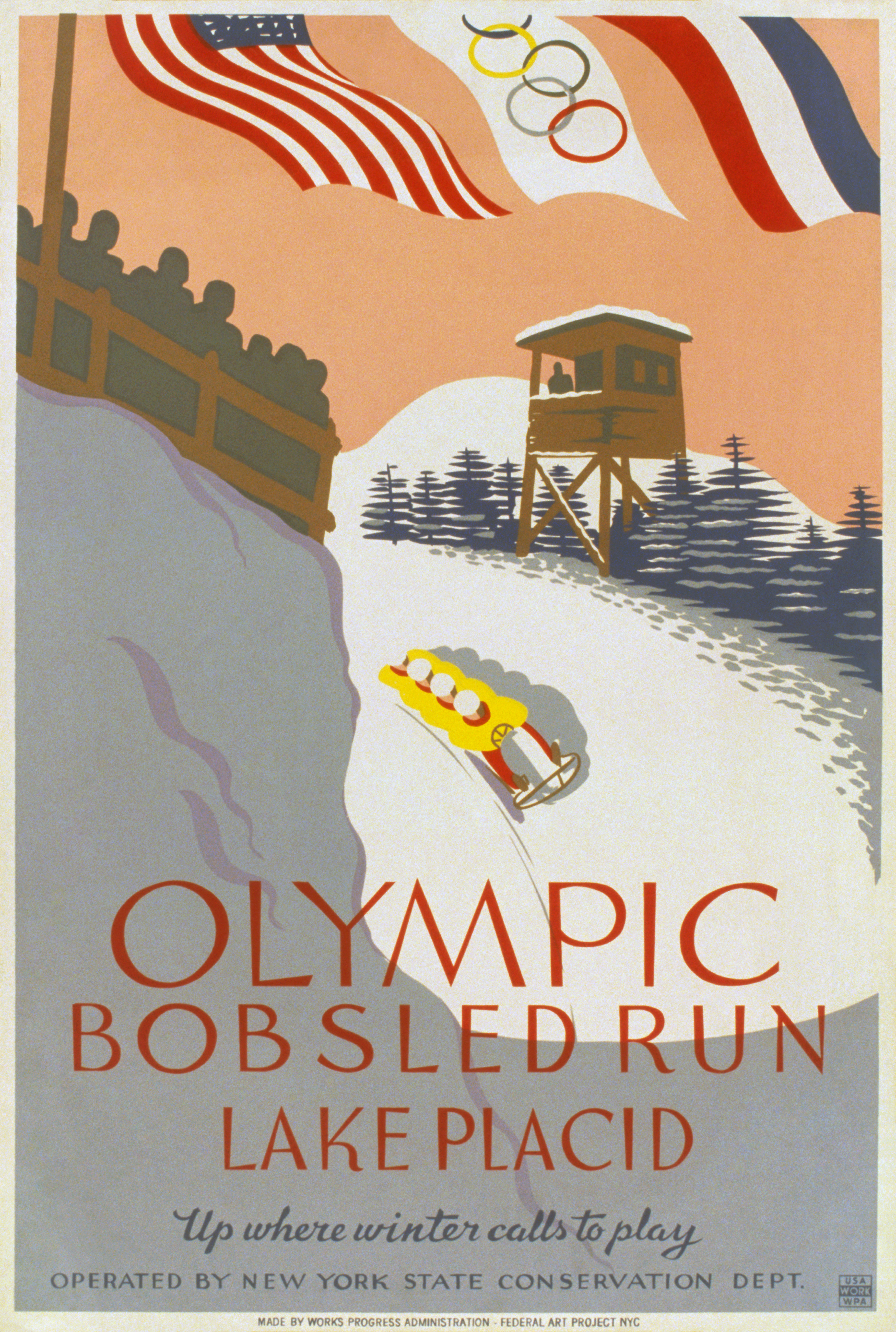
Works Progress Administration poster from the late 1930s to advertise public access to the Mt. Van Hoevenberg Olympic Bobsled Run

Lake Placid hosted the Winter Olympics in 1932 and 1980. Lake Placid, St Moritz, Innsbruck, and Cortina d'Ampezzo are the only sites to have twice hosted the Winter Olympic Games.

Jack Shea, a resident of the village, became the first person to win two gold medals when he doubled in speed skating at the 1932 Winter Olympics.

In the U.S., the village is especially remembered as the 1980 USA–USSR hockey game site. Dubbed the "Miracle on Ice", a group of American college students and amateurs upset seasoned and professional Soviet national ice hockey team, 4–3, and two days later won the gold medal. Another historic first was the performance of American speed-skater Eric Heiden, who won five gold medals.

In June 2026, Governor Kathy Hochul formed an exploratory committee to study a potential joint New York City-Lake Placid bid for the 2042 Winter Olympics.

=== Other international sporting events ===
Lake Placid has continued to host international multi-sport events. The World University Games took place there on two occasions; hosting the 1972 Winter Universiade and the 2023 Winter World University Games. Lake Placid hosted the 2000 Goodwill Winter Games.

=== Regular sporting events ===
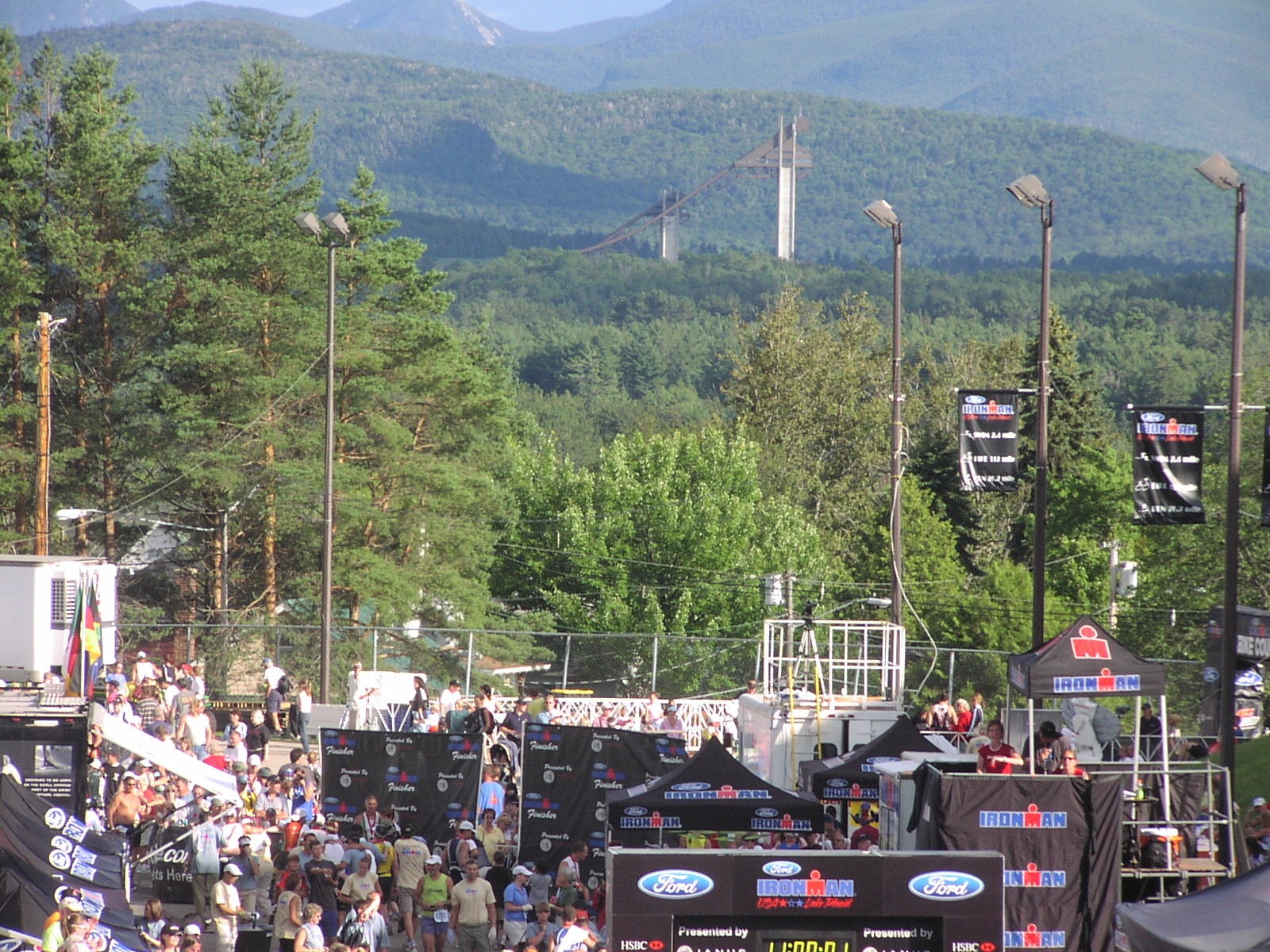
2006 Ironman in Lake Placid

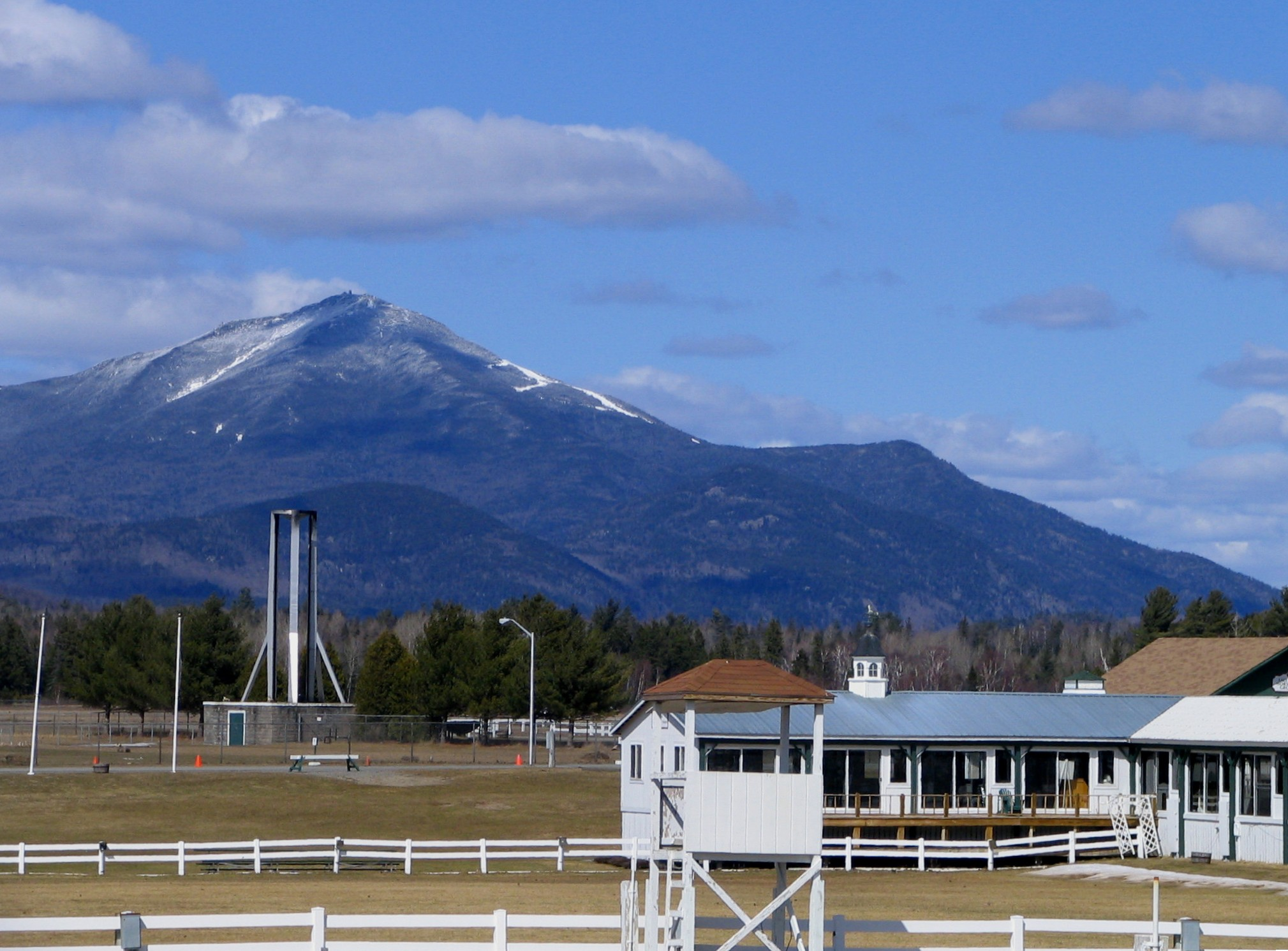
North Elba Showgrounds, showing Horse Rings, Olympic Cauldron, Whiteface Mountain

- Since 1999 Lake Placid has been a site for the annual Ironman Lake Placid Triathlon, the second oldest Ironman in North America and one of ten official Ironman Triathlons held in the continental U.S.
- The Lake Placid and I Love New York Horse Shows have been held at the North Elba Showgrounds since 1969.
- The Winter Empire State Games were held in Lake Placid in February until they were discontinued in 2010.
- The Lake Placid ice dance competition is held every year in July or August in the 1980 Olympic Arena.
- CAN/AM hosts an adult pond hockey tournament. The Canadian American pond hockey tournament is held in February on Mirror Lake.
- The Lake Placid Summit Classic Lacrosse Tournament is held every year in early August since 1990; roughly 250 teams participate.

== Recreation ==
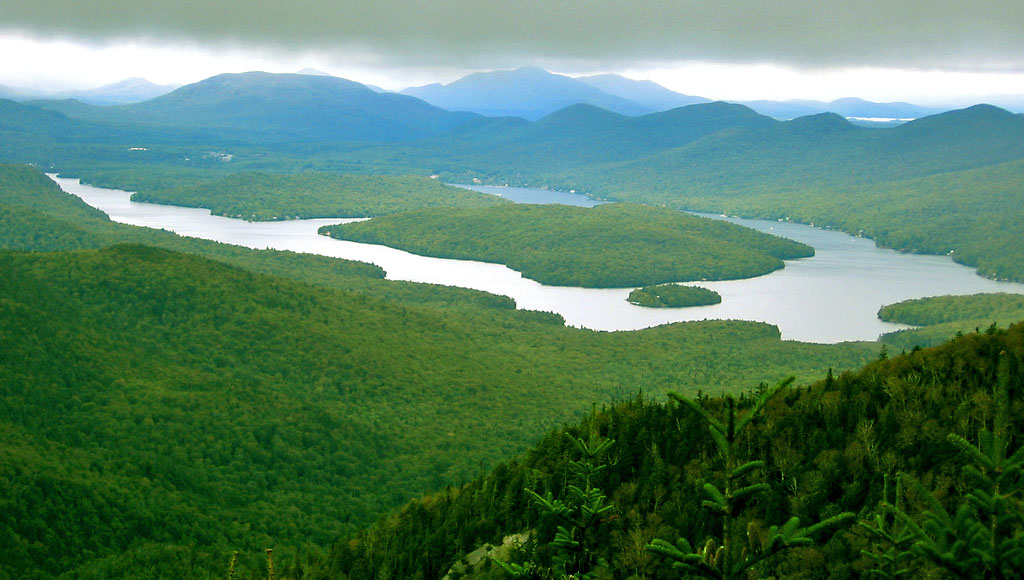
Aerial view of the lake which gave the community its name

Lake Placid is well known among winter-sports enthusiasts for its skiing, both Alpine and Nordic. Whiteface Mountain (4,867 ft or 1,483 m), in nearby Wilmington about 13 miles (21 km) from Lake Placid, offers skiing, hiking, gondola rides, and mountain biking, and is the only one of the High Peaks that can be reached by an auto road. Whiteface Mountain has a vertical elevation of 3,430 feet (1,050 m), the highest vertical elevation of mountains in Eastern North America. The area has one of only 16 bobsled runs in the Western Hemisphere.

In 2010, U.S. News & World Report highlighted Lake Placid as one of the "6 Forgotten Vacation Spots" in North America.

Many people use Lake Placid as a base from which to climb the 46 High Peaks in the Adirondack Mountains.

Lake Placid built its first golf course in 1898, one of the first in the U.S., and has more courses than any other venue in the Adirondacks. Many of its courses were designed by well-known golf course architects, such as Seymour Dunn and Alister MacKenzie. The geographic features of the Adirondacks were considered reminiscent of the Scottish landscape, where the game started, and thus a fitting canvas for original play, or "mountain golf".

Lake Placid is near the West Branch of the Ausable River, a well-known stretch of water for fly fishing.

== Education ==
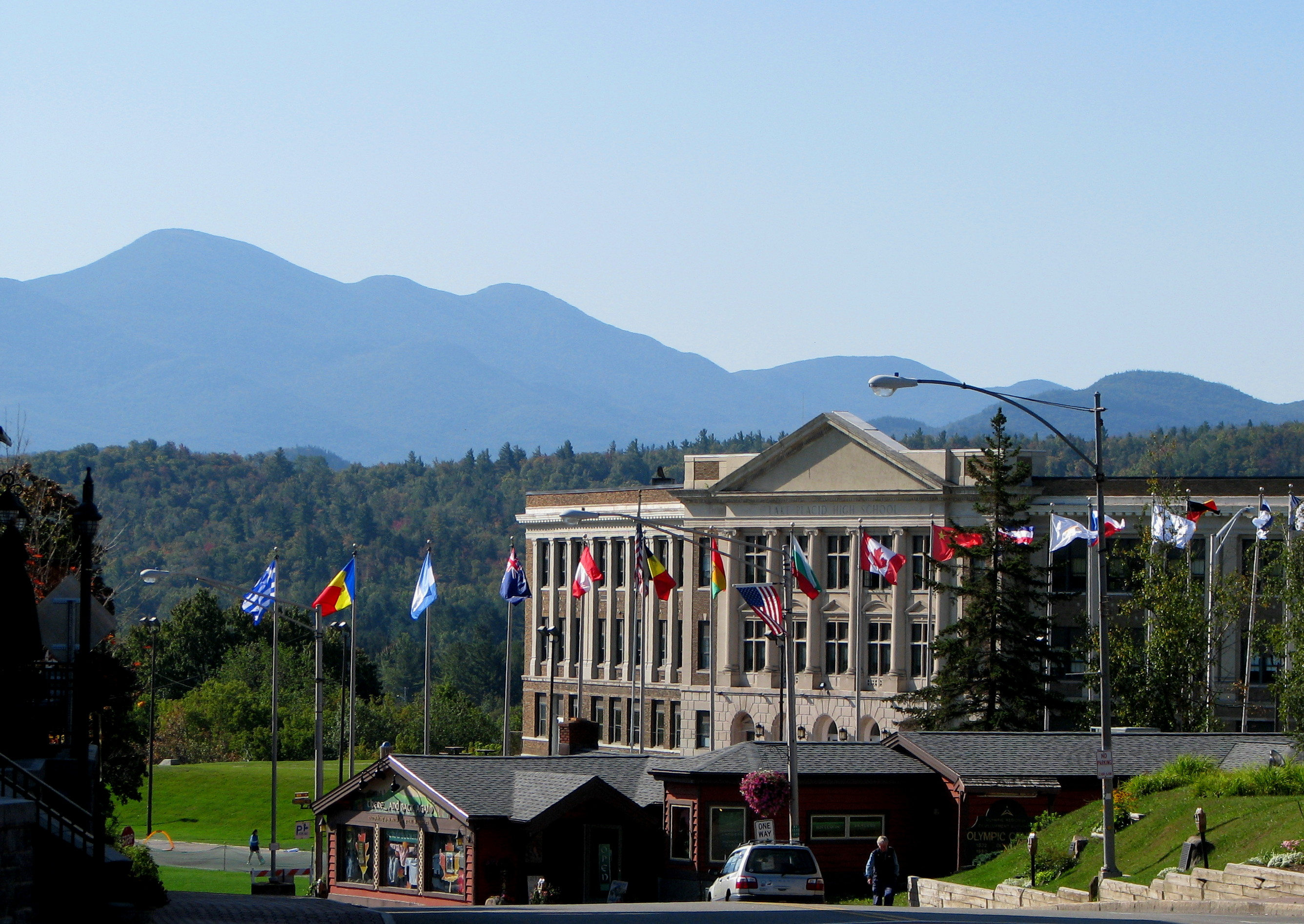
Lake Placid High School

- Postsecondary education
  - North Country Community College
- Primary and secondary education
  - In Lake Placid, public education is administered by the Lake Placid Central School District.

Lake Placid is home to five private schools:

- Mountain Lake Academy
- National Sports Academy
- North Country School
- Northwood School
- St. Agnes School

== Notable residents ==
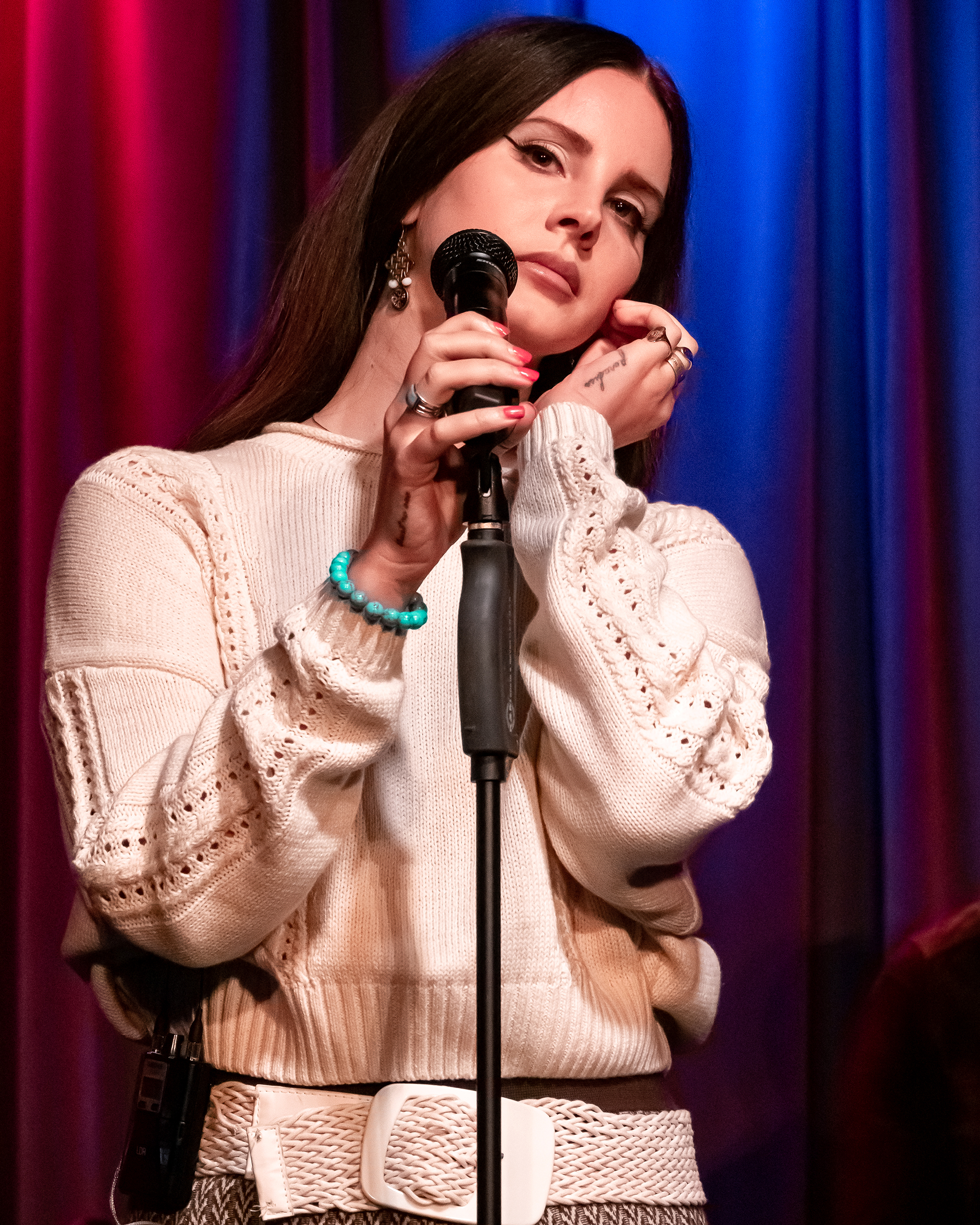
Singer-songwriter Lana Del Rey was raised in Lake Placid.

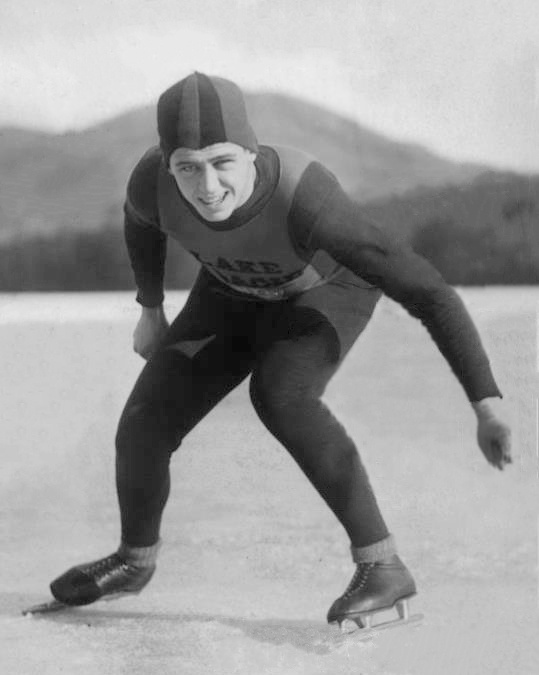
Speed Skater Jack Shea was born in Lake Placid and won 2 gold medals at the 1932 Winter Olympics.

- Bill Beaney (born 1951) ice hockey coach
- John Brown (1800–1859), abolitionist
- Chadd Cassidy (born August 3, 1973), AHL coach
- Lana Del Rey (born 1985), singer and songwriter
- John Desrocher (born 1964), ambassador to Algeria
- Godfrey Dewey (1887–1977), president of the Lake Placid Organizing Committee
- Melvil Dewey (1851–1931), inventor of the Dewey Decimal Classification System, founder of the Lake Placid Club
- Victor Herbert (1859–1924), composer and summer resident
- Chris Ortloff (born 1947), former New York State Assemblyman
- Artur Rodziński (1892–1958), conductor
- Katharine Sharp (1865–1914), pioneer in library science, died there in a car crash
- Marcella Sembrich (1858–1935), opera singer
- Kate Smith (1907–1986), singer
- James Tolkan (1931-2026), actor
- Craig Wood (1901–1968), golfer

=== Winter Olympic athletes ===
- Lowell Bailey (b. 1981), biathlete
- Stanley Benham (1913–1970), bobsledder
- Ashley Caldwell (b. 1993), freestyle skier
- Art Devlin (1922–2004) ski jumper, decorated World War II veteran, sports commentator
- Peter Frenette (b. 1992), ski jumper
- Mark Grimmette (b. 1971), luger
- Eric Heiden (born 1958), speedskater
- Haley Johnson (b. 1981), biathlete
- Jack Shea (1910–2002), speed skater
- Jimmy Shea (b. 1968), luger
- Andrew Weibrecht (born 1986), alpine skier
