= New York State Route 431 =

Highway in New York

New York State Route 431
- Whiteface Mountain Veterans Memorial Highway
- NY 431 highlighted in red

Route information
- Maintained by NYSDEC
- Length: 7.96 mi (12.81 km)
- Existed: by 1932–present
- History: Completed in 1935

Major junctions
- South end: NY 86 in Wilmington
- North end: Peak of Whiteface Mountain

Location
- Country: United States
- State: New York
- Counties: Essex

Highway system
- New York Highways; Interstate; US; State; Reference; Parkways
← NY 430	→ NY 432

New York State Route 431 (NY 431) is a state highway in Essex County, New York, United States. The highway, also known as the Whiteface Mountain Veterans Memorial Highway, begins at an intersection with NY 86 in Wilmington and climbs Whiteface Mountain in the Adirondacks. The New York State Department of Environmental Conservation maintains the highway, which is 7.96 miles (12.81 km) long.

Marcellus Leonard, a merchant from nearby Saranac Lake, originally proposed the highway in the late 19th century. However, serious plans for the highway did not develop until the 1920s. Construction of the route began in 1929 and was completed in 1935; Leonard died six months before the opening. The 25-mile-per-hour (40 km/h) highway varies in elevation from over 2,000 feet (610 m) to over 4,500 feet (1,372 m) and increases in elevation by about 450 feet (137 m) per mile as it heads away from NY 86. The Whiteface Highway was listed on the National Register of Historic Places in 2008.

== Route description ==
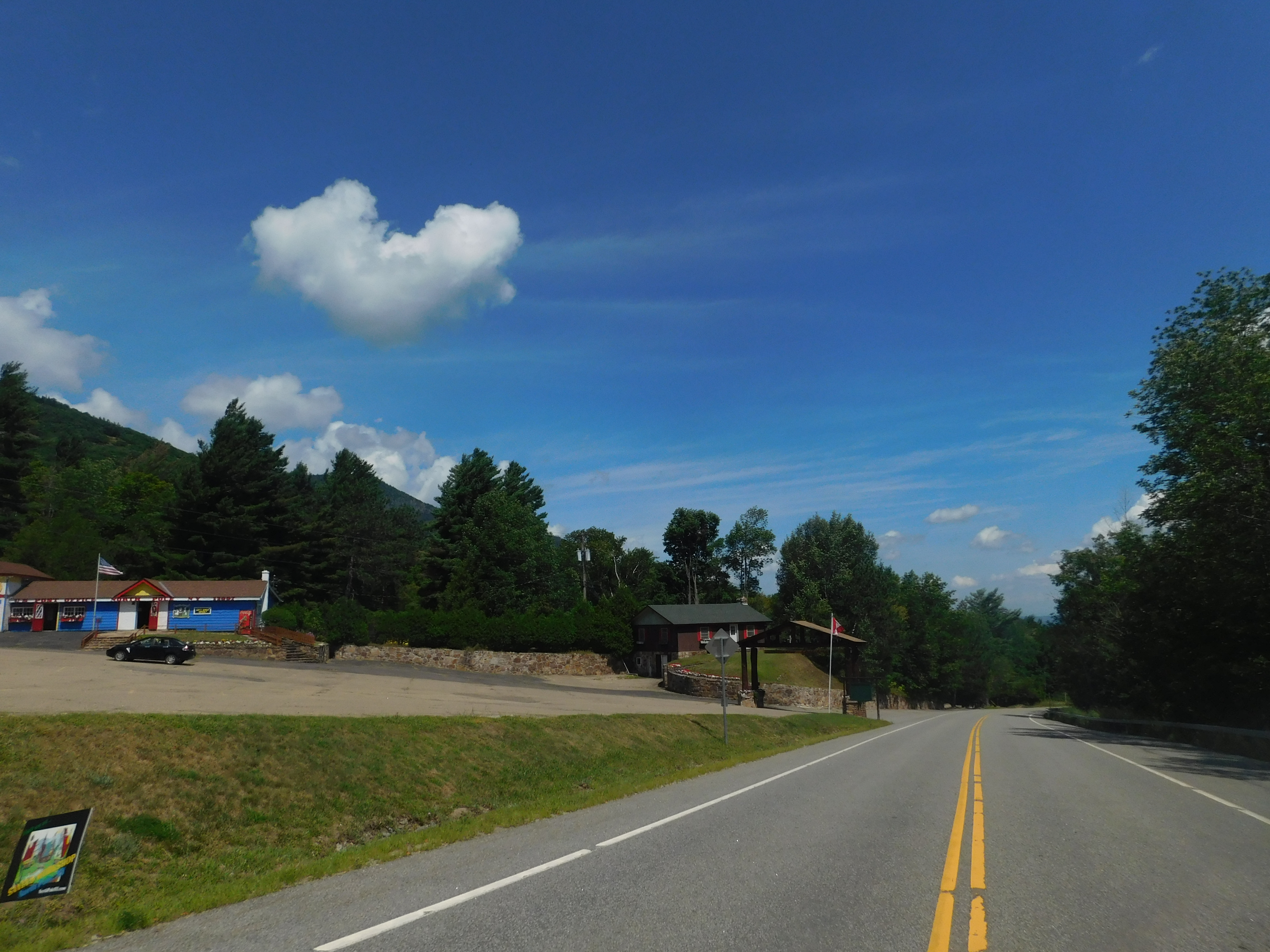
NY 431 southbound at Santa's Workshop

The Whiteface Highway, also known as NY 431, begins at an intersection with NY 86 in Wilmington. The intersection is signed, but the highway itself is unsigned except for mileposts. The highway heads to the west, ascending in elevation as it approaches Whiteface Mountain. It heads through a pass between Morgan and Esther Mountains, two smaller mountains adjacent to Whiteface Mountain, on its way to an intersection with County Route 72 (CR 72), the last highway that NY 431 intersects. Just west of CR 72, NY 431 passes through a toll booth and becomes a toll road. The NY 431 designation continues along the highway to the Union Falls Overlook, a scenic view 2,700 feet (820 m) in elevation about one mile (1.6 km) into the scenic drive. Th

At this point, NY 431 curves to the south, climbing up the western side of both Esther Mountain and Whiteface Mountain. Upon reaching 3,300 feet (1,000 m) in elevation, a large building at the top of Whiteface Mountain called the Castle becomes visible, and Union Falls Pond can be seen more clearly below. The scenic drive continues up Whiteface Mountain to its summit, which NY 431 ascends toward by way of a pair of hairpin turns just north of the peak. At the first of the turns, the highway reaches an overlook 3,700 feet (1,100 m) in elevation that provides views of parts of Lake Placid and the Olympic Village. The road and the NY 431 designation both terminate at a parking lot about 300 feet (91 m) below the summit of Whiteface Mountain, where the Castle is located.

== History ==
The idea of constructing a road up Whiteface Mountain was first conceived in the late 19th and early 20th centuries by Marcellus Leonard, an entrepreneur from Saranac Lake. The plans for the highway began to take shape in the 1920s when the land for the road was given by its owner to the state of New York on the condition that it would be named after America's Great War veterans. The road was later renamed to honor veterans from all wars. Governor Franklin Delano Roosevelt signed the dedication for the highway in 1929.

Just after construction was announced for the new roadway, plans were developed in 1929 for a World War I monument at the top of Whiteface Mountain. The American Legion supported the new tower, which was to be 130 feet (40 m) high and feature a light visible for over 75 miles (121 km). The height of the tower was later reduced to 80 feet (24 m), but the project still faced opposition from the Association for Protection of the Adirondacks and the New York Fish Game and Forest League. Lithgow Osborne, who ran the New York State Conservation Department, stated the tower would destroy the landscape of Whiteface. Despite the controversy, the bill for the memorial was passed by both houses of the New York State Legislature in April 1934, with the State Senate approving it by a vote of 45–2. Governor Herbert Lehman received the bill on April 19, vowing to veto it. He followed through on his promise on May 16, 1934, commenting that the tower would deface the summit of Whiteface Mountain. Lehman added that while he generally supported memorials for veterans, it would be inappropriate to deface a summit for the memorial.

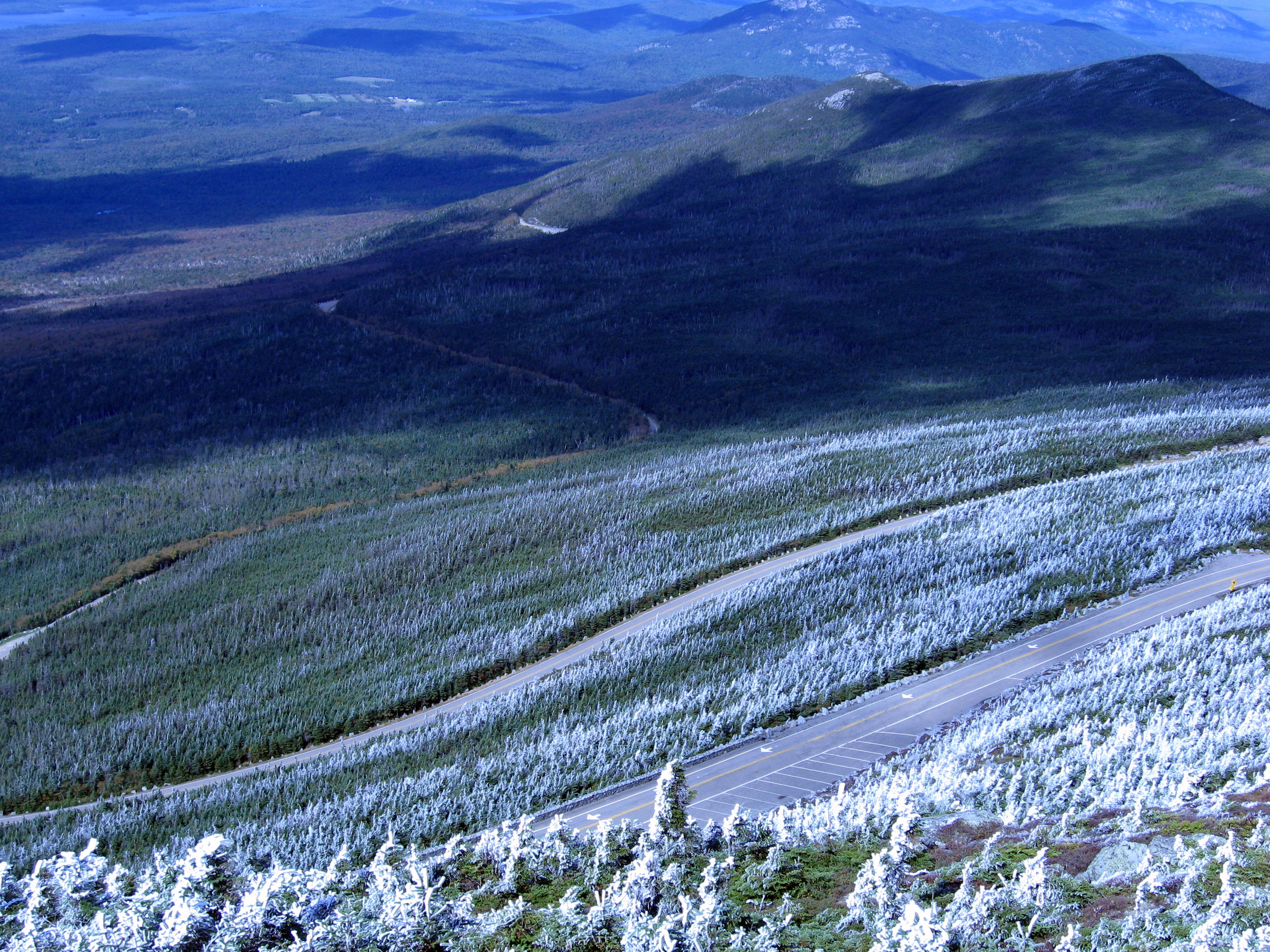
The upper reaches of NY 431 viewed from the top of Whiteface Mountain

Plans for the Whiteface Mountain Highway surfaced in 1929, and a bid of $687,572.50 (1931 USD) was submitted to construct the new roadway two years later. The final plans called for an 8-mile (13 km), 20-foot (6.1 m) wide highway climbing 3,500 feet (1,100 m) in elevation with grade changes of 8–10%. A toll of $1 for each car and its driver and $1 for each additional passenger would be charged to drive up the new highway ($15 in 2018, $8 each additional passenger). Construction started in 1931, with crews working until near Christmas when snowfall impeded their progress. Work on the parkway resumed on March 15, 1932. The new stone walls guarding the new highway cost about $100,000 (1931 USD) to construct. The highway opened to traffic on July 20, 1935.

On September 14, 1935, it was formally dedicated by Roosevelt, now President of the United States, at a ribbon-cutting ceremony. In all, the road cost $1.2 million to construct. President Roosevelt also requested that an elevator be constructed to help visitors from the parking lot to the summit of Whiteface Mountain. Unfortunately, Marcellus Leonard, the person considered to be the "father" of the highway, did not live to see the highway open as he died at 90 years old on February 23, 1935, a few months before the road opened. The completed highway was assigned NY 431, a designation which had been reserved for the road as early as 1932.

The road was listed on the National Register of Historic Places in October 2008 as the "Whiteface Veterans Memorial Highway Complex". The National Park Service, which keeps the Register, announced the listing nine months later.

== Major intersections ==
The entire route is in Wilmington, Essex County.

mi	km	Destinations	Notes
0.00	0.00	NY 86 – Jay, Au Sable Forks, Lake Placid, Whiteface Mt Ski Center	Southern terminus; hamlet of Wilmington
2.55	4.10	CR 72	
7.96	12.81	Summit of Whiteface Mountain	Northern terminus
1.000 mi = 1.609 km; 1.000 km = 0.621 mi

== See also ==
- Prospect Mountain Veterans Memorial Highway, a highway of the same type in the Adirondacks
