= List of New York State Historic Markers in Richmond County, New York =

This is a complete list of New York State Historic Markers in Richmond County, New York.

== Listings county-wide ==
	Marker name	Image	Date designated	Location	City or Town	Marker text
1	Battle Hill			On corner of Western and Washington Ave.	Richmond, New York	Site of Indian village attacked by Dutch 1643 and of British redoubt during the Revolution.
2	Burial Place			On Richmond Av. between railroad and Richmond Ter.	Port Richmond, New York	Burial place of the Dutch settlers of the North Shore until 1696 around which Port Richmond was built.
3	Conference House			100 Ft. from Phillip St., near Craig Ave. and Hylan Boulevard	Tottenville, Staten Island	Where Benj. Franklin, John [Adams ...] parley with Lord Howe and Sir Henry Strachey, September 11, 1776.
4	French Church			On Arthur Kill Road between Gifford's land and Richmond Ave.	Richmond, New York	1695. Stood near this spot. Then the only church on Staten Island.
5	Old Town			On corner of Old Town Road.	Old Town, Staten Island	First permanent settlement made on Staten Island 1661 by Pierre Billiou & others with permission of the Dutch West India Company.
6	English Church			On Richmond Road.	Richmond, New York	On this spot stood an English Church (Presbyterian) from 1729-1769.
7	Perine House			On Richmond Road.	Richmond, New York	Land Pat. Sept. 1677 to Thom. Stillwell previously covered by Dutch ground briefs to Pierre Billiou and Han Christofel.
8	Signal Hill			Near Bay St.	Richmond, New York	Used as a signal station in a military reservation near Bay St. Fortifications rebuilt 1812.
9	Site of Fort Knyphausen			On Daniel Low Terrace between Fort Place and Low Circle.	Richmond, New York	Site of Fort Knyphausen occupied by British in Revolution.
10	The Christopher House			About 200 ft. from Willow Brook Rd. and Victory Bldg.	Richmond, New York	Erected about 1750. Home of Revolution, traditionally, meeting place of S.I. Patriots.

== See also ==
- List of New York State Historic Markers
- National Register of Historic Places listings in Richmond County, New York
- List of National Historic Landmarks in New York
