= List of New York State Historic Markers in Erie County, New York =

This is a complete list of New York State Historic Markers in Erie County, New York.

== Listings county-wide ==
	Marker name	Image	Date designated	Location	City or Town	Marker text
1	Main Street			State Route #9, South Road	Amherst, New York	Surveyed in 1799 by Joseph Ellicott along the line of the old "Central Trail" from Albany, was an early stagecoach route and wagon trail to the West.
2	U.S. Barracks 1812			On NY 5 in Village of Williamsville	Williamsville, New York	Along Garrison Rd to creek and extending southeast where log barracks of Gen Smyth's Army during winter of 1812 and '13. These buildings were later used as hospital.
3	Pioneer Church			On US 219 at Boston.	Boston, New York	Founded by Rev. John Spencer, missionary, 1811. Meeting house erected 1837. Rear section housed select school, organized 1809.
4	Site of Old Jubilee Spring House			On Delaware Avenue.	Buffalo, New York	Site of Old Jubilee Spring House built in 1830. Source of early water supply.
5	Wilcox Mansion			On Delaware Avenue.	Buffalo, New York	Site of Army barracks established here in 1838. President Theodore Roosevelt took the oath of office as President of the United States.
6	War of 1812 Cemetery			On Garrison Road at Ellicott Creek Road.	Buffalo, New York	Arrow, 1/4 mile to War of 1812 Cemetery.
7	St. John's Cemetery			On Eggert Road near Sheridan Drive.	Tonawanda, New York	First burial 1839, organized 1850, restored 1934. Known as "Werkley" Cemetery.
8	Jack Berry's Town			Village of Gardenville in Memorial Park.	Gardenville, New York	Largest post Revolutionary Seneca Indian village occupied this site, 1780-1840.
9	Middle Ebenezer			Village of Gardenville by Bridge over Buffalo Creek.	Gardenville, New York	Home (1834-1864) of Christian Metz, leader of the Community of True Inspiration.

== See also ==
- List of New York State Historic Markers
- National Register of Historic Places listings in New York
- List of National Historic Landmarks in New York
