= List of New York State Historic Markers in Rockland County, New York =

This is an incomplete list of New York State Historic Markers in Rockland County, New York.

== Listings county-wide ==
	Marker name	Image	Date designated	Location	City or Town	Coords	Marker text
1	"'76 HOUSE"			110 Main St	Tappan, New York		Where Major John André, British Spy, Plotter With Benedict Arnold To Deliver West Point, New York, Was Confined Before His Execution
2	DeWint House			20 Livingston Avenue	Tappan, New York		Washington's Headquarters and the oldest surviving structures in Rockland County. Used Sept 28 - Oct 2, 1780 during The Trial Of John André, British Spy, Plotter With Benedict Arnold.
3	GENERAL LAFAYETTE			Western Hwy. In Tappan	Orangetown, Town Of, New York		Lived Here In A House On The Bogart Farm In 1780. Opposite Is Spring Used By Continental Army Camped On The West Ridge
4	THE MANSE			Westwood-old Tappan Rd., W. Of Greenbush Rd., In Tappan	Orangetown, Town Of, New York		Built 1726, Dominie Samuel Verbryck Lived Here During Revolution. He Was Friend Of Washington. He Founded Rutgers College, N. J.
5	TRIAL OF ANDRE			Main St., North Of Washington St. In Tappan	Orangetown, Town Of, New York		The British Spy, Andre, Was Found Guilty, In The Dutch Church Which Stood, In 1780, On The Site Of The Edifice
6	TURN LEFT AT LIGHT			On Us 9W At Oak Tree Rd.	Orangetown, Town Of, New York		Dewindt House George Washington Headquarters Sept. 28 - Oct. 2, 1780
7	WASHINGTON'S CAMP			Western Hwy. & Washington Ave. In Tappan	Orangetown, Town Of, New York		On The Ridge West, 1782, The American Army, After Its Return From Yorktown, Encamped Under Generals Washington And Greene
8	ARROW			On Us 9W At Oak Tree Rd.	Orangetown, Town Of, New York		2 Miles De Windt House George Washington Headquarters Set. 28 - Oct. 2, 1780
9	ARROW			Summit Ave. & Old Tappan Rd. In Tappan	Orangetown, Town Of, New York		Andre Monument On The Hill South Is The Site Of The Gallows Where Major John Andre, British Spy, Was Hanged, And Buried, On Oct. 2, 1780.
10	"WORK I"			In Stony Point Park	Stony Point, Town Of, New York		A British Redoubt Mounting A Twelve-pound Cannon Was Located Here, July 1779.
11	AMERICAN BLOCKHOUSE			In Stony Point Park	Stony Point, Town Of, New York		Here Stood An Unfinished American Blockhouse Which Was Burned By Its Defenders On May 31, 1779, When The British Seized The Point
12	BUCKBERG MOUNTAIN			Buckberg Mt. Rd., 1/2 Mi. S. Mott Rd.	Stony Point, Town Of, New York		Here Generals Washington And Wayne, Surveyed The British Fort On Stony Point And Planned The Victory Of July 15–16, 1779.
13	BUCKBERG MOUNTAIN ROAD			Buckberg Rd., W. Of Us 9W	Stony Point, Town Of, New York		In 1776-1783, This Was An Important Military Route Over The Dunderberg To Doodletown, Forts Clinton And Montgomery And West Point.
14	CHRISTIAN FEBIGER			In Stony Point Park	Stony Point, Town Of, New York		A Dane, Colonel Of The Second Regiment Of The Light Infantry Under Wayne, Led The Main Body In The Right Column
15	COLONEL BUTLER			In Stony Point Park	Stony Point, Town Of, New York		Of Pennsylvania, Led The Left Assaulting Column Of Americans Up The Steep Slope At This Point
16	DOODLETOWN			Us 9W At Doodletown Rd.	Stony Point, Town Of, New York		Half A Mile Up This Road Is Doodletown, Pioneer Hamlet Through Which The British Army Marched To Attack Ft. Clinton, 1777.
17	FRANCO-AMERICAN ARMY			In Stony Point Park	Stony Point, Town Of, New York		En Route To Capture Cornwallis At Yorktown, In Virginia, Crossed King's Ferry In August, 1781.
18	GENERAL WAYNE			In Stony Point Park	Stony Point, Town Of, New York		Was Wounded By The British Grapeshot Leading The Right Column Up The Slope Near This Point.
19	KING'S FERRY			In Stony Point Park	Stony Point, Town Of, New York		Below This Hill Is Located The Western Terminus Of Historic King's Ferry Of The American Revolution, 1776-1783.
20	LIEUT. KNOX			In Stony Point Park	Stony Point, Town Of, New York		At The Head Of The Forlorn Hope Of The Left Column Entered The Main British Redoubt At This Point
21	MAJOR MURFREE			In Stony Point Park	Stony Point, Town Of, New York		With Massachusetts And North Carolina Companies Engaged British Outpost Here By Firing To Cover The Two Flank Movements
22	MILITARY ROAD			In Stony Point Park	Stony Point, Town Of, New York		Leading To The Central British Redoubt Followed This Route, 1779
23	SIX STATES			In Stony Point Park	Stony Point, Town Of, New York		Pennsylvania, Connecticut, Massachusetts, Maryland, Virginia And North Carolina, Gave The Men Of The Light Infantry.
24	THE FINAL COMBAT			In Stony Point Park	Stony Point, Town Of, New York		A Hand To Hand Melee, American Bayonets Against British Musketry And Cannon, Took Place In The Central Redoubt Here.
25	THE FIRST ROAD			Us 9W & Main St., In Stony Point	Stony Point, Town Of, New York		Across Hudson Highlands From Stony Point To Central Valley, Made About 1760, Via Cedar Ponds Followed This Road
26	THE INNER LINE			In Stony Point Park	Stony Point, Town Of, New York		Of The British Abatis Of Tree Trunks And Sharpened Stakes Ran From The North To The South Shore Of The Point Here.
27	THE LARGER BODY			In Stony Point Park	Stony Point, Town Of, New York		Of Americans, In The Right Coluymn, Under Gen. Wayne, Crossed The Marsh And Cove To The South To Scale British Works
28	THE LEFT COLUMN			In Stony Point Park	Stony Point, Town Of, New York		Of The Americans Divided Here, At Mud Bridge, The Main Body, Under Colonel Butler, Marching Around The North Shore
29	THE MAIN GATE			In Stony Point Park	Stony Point, Town Of, New York		Of The Central British Redoubt Was Located Here, 1779.
30	THE OUTER LINE			In Stony Point Park	Stony Point, Town Of, New York		Of The Abatis Of Felled Trees And Pointed Stakes Made By The British Garrison Crossed Here From Shore To Shore
31	TWO COMPANIES			In Stony Point Park	Stony Point, Town Of, New York		Of The Seventeenth British Regiment Of Foot Were Stationed Here At The Time Of The Assault, July 15, 1779.
32	WORK "H"			In Stony Point Park	Stony Point, Town Of, New York		A British Redoubt Mounting A Twelve-pound Cannon Was Located Here, July, 1779.
33	ARROW			On Park Rd., E. Of Us 9W	Stony Point, Town Of, New York		Stony Point Battlefield July 16, 1779
34	ARROW			On Park Rd., E. Of Us 9W	Stony Point, Town Of, New York		Stony Point Battlefield July 16, 1779
35	ARROW			Us 9W, 1/4 Mi. No. Of Vlge. Stony Point	Stony Point, Town Of, New York		Stony Point Battlefield July 16, 1779

== See also ==
- List of New York State Historic Markers
- National Register of Historic Places listings in New York
- List of National Historic Landmarks in New York
