= List of New York State Historic Markers in Schenectady County, New York =

This is an incomplete list of New York State Historic Markers in Schenectady County, New York.

== Listings county-wide ==
	Marker name	Image	Date designated	Location	City or Town	Coords	Marker text
1	BAPTIST CHURCH			On Nys 30 At Braman Corners	Duanesburg, Town Of, New York		Society Organized 1800 Uniting Duanesburg & Florida Baptists - 1St Ministers-elders Reuben Mudge, Elnathan Finch Present Edifice Built 1868
2	COUNTY LINE			On Co. Rd. N. Of Eaton Crnrs. Schenectady-montgomery Co. Line	Duanesburg, Town Of, New York		Meeting House Erected Here About 1800 It Was Used By All Denominations Worshiping In The Vicinity.
3	DUANE MANSION			Route 7	Duanesburg, Town Of, New York		Erected In 1812, By Catherine Livingston Duane, Youngest Daughter Of Hon. James Duane. Grounds Planned By Jacques Ramee, Noted French Artist
4	FRIENDS			On Nys 7 At Quaker Street	Duanesburg, Town Of, New York		Meeting House Erected 1807 Near Site Of Original Log Structure 1St Preacher - Ezekiel Tripp Society Organized About 1790
5	FROST HOMESTEAD			On Nys 159 At Mariaville	Duanesburg, Town Of, New York		This House Was Built By James Frost In 1834, Using Reclaimed Portions From The Featherstonhaugh Mansion Built In 1808
6	NEAR SITE OF OLD			On Co. Rd. About 2 Miles Southwest Of Mariaville	Duanesburg, Town Of, New York		Sherburne Tannery Est. By John Sherburne About 1790. After Clearing Land The Business Brought Him Over $100,000
7	OLD MILL SITE			On Cline Farm Near Eaton Crnrs.	Duanesburg, Town Of, New York		Here After Revolution Were Built A Sawmill And Gristmill. Abandoned Later Because Freshets Tore Dams Away
8	OLD SHOP SITE			On Cline Farm Near Eaton Crnrs.	Duanesburg, Town Of, New York		Where Benjamin Cummings Founder Of Cummings Hollow Forged First Circular Saw In America In 1814 For His Schenectady Mill
9	PIONEER BAPTIST			On Couynty Rd. About 2 Miles Southwest Of Mariaville	Duanesburg, Town Of, New York		Of Schenectady County Rev. Elijah Herrick, 1St To Preach In Duanesburg After Service In Revolution. At Charleston Served 50 Years
10	SITE OF			At Eaton Corners	Duanesburg, Town Of, New York		Post Office & Store Established About 1820 By Lemuel Easton And Run For Years. He Brought The Mail Each Saturday On Horseback
11	SOCIETY OF THE REFORMED			On Us 20 About 1 Mile West Of Duanesburg	Duanesburg, Town Of, New York		Presbyterian Church Org. 1795 By Rev. Mckinney, 1St Ministers: Rev. Mcmaster, Wylie, & Ramsay. Present Edifice Built 1836
12	A FORMER LAKE			On Co. Rd. About 3/4 Mi. West Of Glenville	Glenville, Town Of, New York		Just North Of These Gravel Knolls Is The Basin Of A Postglacial Lake. Here Men Of An Arctic Type Once Lived And Hunted
13	A NOTABLE HOME			On Nys 5 At Hoffmans	Glenville, Town Of, New York		Here About 1720 Stood The First House In This Part Of The Valley, Home Of Seven Generations Of The Van Eps Family
14	ABRAHAM GLEN			On Mohawk Ave. In Scotia	Glenville, Town Of, New York		House 1730 Built By Abraham Glen Where King's Highway Left Mohawk River
15	AN EARLY HOTEL			On Nys 147 About 1½ Miles N. Of Glenville Center	Glenville, Town Of, New York		Known As "Upper Nickey's" Built And Kept By Nicholas Van Patten In 18th Century. First Glenville Town Meeting Held Here In 1821
16	CEMENT MILL			On Nys 5 Near Schenectady-montgomery Co. Line	Glenville, Town Of, New York		Here, 1825–45, Stood The Kiln And Mill Of John Van Eps & Sons, Making The First Hydraulic Cement In This Part Of The State
17	CRABB KILL			On County Road At Northeast Edge Of Glenville	Glenville, Town Of, New York		About 1770 Early Settlers Built A Sawmill Here, And Here (1840–1860) Was The Tannery And Shoeshop Of Rockwell Harmon
18	FALL TREE KILL			On Co. Rd. About 1¾ Mis. East Of Glenville	Glenville, Town Of, New York		Named By The First Settler Of The Region. Here, His Primitive Bridge A Fallen Tree, The Red Man Crossed This Stream
19	FIRST CHURCH			On County Rd. At Hoffmans	Glenville, Town Of, New York		In Glenville Built 1785, Here Stood The "Church At The Woestina" (Church In The Wilderness) Removed To Rotterdam 1812
20	FIRST REFORMED			On Co. Road At Glenville	Glenville, Town Of, New York		Dutch Church Of Glenville, Built 1812- 13, Remodeled 1871 Simon I. Van Patten, Architect And Builder
21	GLEN-SANDERS HOUSE, 1713			Intersection Of Mohawk & Sanders Aves., Scotia	Glenville, Town Of, New York		Built By Capt. Johannes Glen Partly Of Materials In First Mohawk Valley House Built By Alexander Glen, 1655
22	HOFFMANS FERRY			On Nys 5 At Hoffmans	Glenville, Town Of, New York		Here About 1790 Harmanus Vedder Established A Ferry Which Bore His Name Until 1835 When The Ferry Rights Were Bought By J. Hoffman
23	JOSIAS SWART			On Nys 5 About 1½ Miles East Of Hoffmans	Glenville, Town Of, New York		Homestead Called The Sixth Flat Josias Swart, B. 1653, Received A Deed From The Trustees Of Schenectady August 5, 1713.
24	KINAQUARIONES			On County Road About 1/2 Mile Northwest Of Hoffmans	Glenville, Town Of, New York		Site Of Archaic Algonkian Village; Its Corn Pits Yet Remain. Through This Vale Ran A Great And Ancient Path, Trod By Many Races
25	MOHAWK TURNPIKE			On Mohawk Ave., Scotia	Glenville, Town Of, New York		Colonial Highway Westward To St. Johnsville Known As "King's Highway" Military Road 1812
26	PRIMITIVE PATH			On Private Road About 1/4 Mile West Of Glenville	Glenville, Town Of, New York		Here Ran A Great And Well- Beaten Path Used By The Archaic Algonkian And Other Nations, Going Between The Sea Coast And Interior
27	PRIMITIVE PATH			On County Road About 1 Mi. Est Of Glenville	Glenville, Town Of, New York		Here Ran A Great And Well- Beaten Path Used By The Archaic Algonkian And Other Nations, Going Between The Sea Coast And Interior
28	SITE OF			On Co. Rd. On Montgomery-schenectady Co. Line About 3/4 Mi. Southwest Of Gr	Glenville, Town Of, New York		M.e. Church Erected 1823. First Pastor Rev. Roswell Kelly. 1842 Organization Removed To Glenville And A New Brick Church Built
29	THE CAMP, 1755–1812			Intersection Of Balston & Sanders Ave. At Scotia	Glenville, Town Of, New York		American Armies Camping Ground On Mohawk River Flats West Of Glen- Sanders House
30	TINKER HILL			On Nys 5 About 1/4 Mile West Of Hutchinson	Glenville, Town Of, New York		Site Of Blockhouse Near River Bank, Built By Capt. Turnis Swart. Stockaded And Armed With Field Piece In War Of Revolution
31	VAN VLECK HOME			On County Road At Glenville	Glenville, Town Of, New York		Here, About 1770, Harmanus Van Vleck Cleared A Tract And Built His House In The Dense Forest, Yet Haunt Of The Wolf, Bear And Panther
32	WOLF HOLLOW			On Co. Rd. About 1½ Miles North Of Hoffmans	Glenville, Town Of, New York		A Fault And Displacement Of 1000 Feet In Earth's Surface Rocks. Here, In 1669, The Mohawks Ambushed Their Algonkian Invaders
33	WOLF HOLLOW			On Co. Road About 1/2 Mile North Of Hoffmans	Glenville, Town Of, New York		A Fault And Displacement Of 1000 Feet In Earth's Surface Rocks. Here, In 1669, The Mohawks Ambushed Their Algonkian Invaders
34	ALBANY PATH			On Nys 5 At East Limits Of Schenectady	Niskayuna, Town Of, New York		Ska-nek-ta-de Trail Through Open Pines Wagon, Stagecoach And Military Road, Now State St. And Route 5 To Albany
35	NISKAYUNA DUTCH			On Sch'dy. - Troy Rd. About 1/4 Mile East Of Niskayuna	Niskayuna, Town Of, New York		Reformed Church Erected In 1828 Preceded By An Edifice Built In 1760 - "Gebed Huis," House Of Prayer, First Building, About 1754
36	LIDDLE HOUSE			On Nys 7 About 1½ Miles East Of Duanesburg	Princetown, Town Of, New York		Built 1793 By Robert Liddle, Early Settler Of Duanesburgh, Who Came From New Castleton, Roxburgshire, Scotland
37	BRADT HOUSE			On Co. Rd. About 3/4 Mile North Of Rotterdam	Rotterdam, Town Of, New York		1735 Early Type Of Dutch Farmhouse. To West Was Woestina (Wilderness)
38	JAN MABIE HOUSE 1670			On Nys 5S About 1/2 Mile E. Of Rotterdam Junction	Rotterdam, Town Of, New York		Most Westerly Settlement On Groote Vlackte (Great Flats). Built By Daniel Janse Van Antwerpen
39	JAN MABIE HOUSE, 1670			On Nys 5S About 1/2 Mile E. Of Rotterdam Junction	Rotterdam, Town Of, New York		Oldest House In Mohawk Valley, East Of This Point, Built By Daniel Janse Van Antwerpen, 1670
40	CANADA 1760			At Intersection Of State St. & Washington Ave.	Schenectady, City Of, New York		Amherst With 6000 Ameri- Cans 4000 British & 200 Boats Marched Via Mohawk &Oswego To Capture Of Montreal Sept. 8, 1760
41	CLINTON'S EXPEDITION			At Intersection Of State St. & Washington Ave.	Schenectady, City Of, New York		June 11, 1779 Left With 1500 Men & 200 Batteaux For Sullivan Campaign Against Iroquois
42	EARLY BRIDGE			At End Of Washington Ave.	Schenectady, City Of, New York		Wooden Suspension Bridge Erected Here 1808 Designed By Theodore Burr. Used By Saratoga Ry., 1832-39. Replaced 1874
43	FREE MASONRY			At Intersection Of State St. & Erie Blvd.	Schenectady, City Of, New York		St. George's Lodge, No.6 F. & A.m. Founded Here 1774 Auspices Of Sir John Johnson, Grand Master, New York Colony
44	RIDE OF SYMON			At Intersection Of Front & Church Sts.	Schenectady, City Of, New York		Schermerhorn On Night Of Feb. 8, 1690. Although Wounded He Rode 20 Miles To Albany Warning Settlers
45	ROBERT SANDERS			On Washington Ave.	Schenectady, City Of, New York		House 1750 Washington Visited Here In 1775 Later Became Schenectady Female Academy
46	SCHENECTADY			At City Hall, Jay St. And Liberty St.	Schenectady, City Of, New York		Settled By Dutch Under Arent Van Curler 1661 Borough 1765 City 1798 County Seat 1808
47	SCHENECTADY			At Intersection Of Ferry St. & Union St.	Schenectady, City Of, New York		Academy Erected On This Corner By Dutch Church 1785 Used By Union College 1796–1804. City Hall 1805-15
48	SITE OF			On Mill Lane Between So. Ferry St. & State St.	Schenectady, City Of, New York		First Mill Built By Sweer Teunsie On Mill Kill 1666. Destroyed By Flood 1673 And Rebuilt. First Industry Of The Mohawk Valley
49	SOUTH SHORE ROAD			At Intersection Of State St. & Erie Blvd.	Schenectady, City Of, New York		Colonial-revolutionary Road To Fort Stanwix And Oswego. Route Of Troops In Five Wars
50	ST. GEORGE'S			On Ferry St. Between Union & Front Sts.	Schenectady, City Of, New York		Church 1762 Organized 1736. Part Of Present Church Built 1759 Used As Barracks During Revolution
51	UNION COLLEGE			On Union St. Opposite Nott Terrace	Schenectady, City Of, New York		Charter Granted 1795 Present North And South College Buildings Erected 1813-14 From Plans By Jacques Ramee
52	YATES HOUSE			On Union St. Between Church & Ferry Sts.	Schenectady, City Of, New York		Reputed Oldest House In City. Typical Early 18Th Century Home Of Abraham Yates

== See also ==
- List of New York State Historic Markers
- National Register of Historic Places listings in New York
- List of National Historic Landmarks in New York
