= List of New York State Historic Markers in Broome County, New York =

This is a complete list of New York State Historic Markers in Broome County, New York.

== Listings county-wide ==
	Marker name	Image	Date designated	Location	City or Town	Marker text
1	Indian Castle			Located Near Junction Of Castle Creek With Chenango River.	Chenango, New York	Called Otsiningo. Destroyed Aug. 18, 1779 during Sullivan Campaign.
2	First Court			Located on US 11 and NYS 12 about 1/2 miles north of Binghamton	Dickinson, New York	First court in this section was held here in 1791 under Elm tree.
3	Sage Creek			Located on NYS 79 about 2 miles north of Windsor	Dickinson, New York	Sage Creek Named For Seth Sage, 1748-1822, Captain In The American Revolution

== See also ==
- List of New York State Historic Markers
- National Register of Historic Places listings in New York
- List of National Historic Landmarks in New York
