= List of New York State Historic Markers in Kings County, New York =

This is a complete list of New York State Historic Markers in Kings County, New York.

== Listings county-wide ==
	Marker name	Image	Date designated	Location	City or Town	Marker text
1	Gravesend			Cemetery Between South Village Rd. And Neck Rd.	Gravesend, Brooklyn	Settled In 1643 By English Quakers Under Lady Deborah Moody On Land Granted To Them By The Dutch Governor Of New Amsterdam
2	Green-Wood Cemetery			On 5th Ave. & 25th St. 40°39′32″N 73°59′42″W	Sunset Park, Brooklyn	Lt. Col. Robert Benson 1739-1823, Buried Here; Clinton In Revolution; Clerk, New York State Senate.
3	Maryland Heroes			On Corner Of 7th St. between 3rd And 4th Ave.40.67135°N 73.9905°W	Gowanus, Brooklyn	Here Lie Buried 256 Soldiers Of The Maryland Battalion Who Fell In The Battle Of Brooklyn On The 27Th Of August, 1776
4	Mazzola Home			133 Clinton St.	Brooklyn Heights	Property Once Owned By Philip Livingston - Signer Declaration Of Independence Home - Brooklyn Excelsiors Baseball Champions - 1860

== See also ==
- List of New York State Historic Markers
- National Register of Historic Places listings in New York
- List of National Historic Landmarks in New York
