= List of New York State Historic Markers in Fulton County, New York =

This is an incomplete list of New York State Historic Markers in Fulton County, New York.

== Listings county-wide ==
	Marker name	Image	Date designated	Location	City or Town	Coords	Marker text
1	FRENCHMANS CREEK			On County Rd. At North Broadalbin	Broadalbin, Town Of, New York		In 1810 Duncan Mc Martin On This Creek Built A Saw, Grist & Woolen Mill. He Was Surveyor, Lawyer, Judge Court Common Pleas 1813; Later Elected State Senator.
2	HANS' CREEK			On County Rd. At Benedict	Broadalbin, Town Of, New York		Named By Sir Wm Johnson After A Fishing Trip With John Conye Who Fell Out Of The Boat And Nearly Drowned. Hans Being The Name For John.
3	1763			At Intersection W. Green St. And N. William St.	Johnstown, City Of, New York		The Drumm House Home Of Edward Wall School- Master Sir William Johnson's Free School
4	CANNON			At E. End Of Blockhouse At Johnson Hall	Johnstown, City Of, New York		Taken From Johnson Hall By Sir John Johnson On His Flight To Canada May 1776 Spiked And Abandoned Near Trail In Adirondacks
5	ERECTED 1772			At Intersection N. William St. & W. Main St.	Johnstown, City Of, New York		Only Colonial Court House In State Of New York First Court General Sessions, Tryon County, September 8, 1772
6	FORT JOHNSTOWN			At Intersection Of S. Perry St. And Montgomery St.	Johnstown, City Of, New York		Important Frontier Civil And Military Prison During Revolution. Inspected By Washington In 1783
7	JAMES BURK'S INN			At Intersection So. William St. & W. Montgomery St.	Johnstown, City Of, New York		Moved Here About 1788. Lot Formerly Sir Wm Johnson's. Village Called John's Town. Younglove Home 1812–1926. D.a.r. Chapter House 1926.
8	JOHNSON HALL 1762			On West State St.	Johnstown, City Of, New York		Baronial Home Of Sir William Johnson. One Of The Most Historic Colonial Buildings In the United States.
9	JOHNSON TRAIL			On West State St.	Johnstown, City Of, New York		Used By Sir Wm. Johnson 1726–1774 Between Fort Johnson And Johnson Hall A Bi-centennial In 1938 Celebrated His Arrival In America
10	UNION HALL			At Intersection E. Main St. & E. State St.	Johnstown, City Of, New York		Famous Post-revolutionary Tavern, Resort Of "Nick" Stoner, Erected 1798 By Capt. Jean Batiste Vaumane De Fon Claire, Former Officer In French Army Under Louis Xvi
11	ARROW			At Intersection N. William St. & W. Green St.	Johnstown, City Of, New York		1/2 Mile To Baronial Home Of Sir William Johnson Erected 1762 Open To Visitors
12	ARROW			On N. Market St. In Front Of St. John's Church	Johnstown, City Of, New York		Grave Of Sir William Johnson Most Outstanding Figure Of Colonial Period. "Builder Of An Empire" (1715–1774)
13	ARROW			At Intersection W. State St. And Hall Ave.	Johnstown, City Of, New York		Baronial Home Of Sir William Johnson Erected 1762 Open To Visitors
14	ARROW			At Intersection S. William St. & W. Madison Ave.	Johnstown, City Of, New York		1 Mile To Baronial Home Of Sir William Johnson Erected 1762 Open To Visitors
15	ARROW			On Town Rd. At N.w. Limits Of City	Johnstown, City Of, New York		Battlefield Battle Of Johnstown Fought Here October 25, 1781. Last Real Battle Of The Revolution
16	ARROW			On West Green St.	Johnstown, City Of, New York		Colonial Cemetery Remains Of Many Johnstown Notables Of Colonial And Revolutionary Days Buried Here
17	[ARROW] NORTH			At Intersection W. Green St. And N. William St.	Johnstown, City Of, New York		Site Of First St. John's Church (1760) Erected By Sir William Johnson; First Church Of England North Of The Mohawk River
18	BAPTIST CHURCH			On Nys 148 About 4 Mis. N.e. Of Gloversville	Mayfield, Town Of, New York		Of Mayfield And Broadalbin Organized Here In 1792, Then The Home Of Caleb Woodworth, Soldier Of Revolution, First Settler
19	INDIAN RAID			On Nys 30 About 3/4 Mile North Of Mayfield	Mayfield, Town Of, New York		Jacob Dunham And Samuel, His Son, Killed Here April 1779. Others Of The Family Escaped By Hiding In The Woods. Site Of Their Home
20	RICE HOMESTEAD			On Nys 148 At Riceville	Mayfield, Town Of, New York		Built About 1790 By Oliver Rice A Soldier Of The American Revolution, Serving Under General Washington
21	SITE OF			On Nys 30 At Mayfield	Mayfield, Town Of, New York		Romeyn's Mill Erected 1773 By Sir William Johnson. Rebuilt By Col. Abraham Romeyn. Commander Montgomery County Militia
22	ARROW			On Town Rd. About 2 Mis. S.e. Of Mayfield	Mayfield, Town Of, New York		Burying Ground Of Major Harmon And Francis Van Buren, Seventh Albany County Regiment; Revolutionary War. Settlers On This Land.
23	ARROW			On Nys 148 At Riceville	Mayfield, Town Of, New York		Riceville Cemetery Here Are Buried Johathan Fisk- Oliver Rice-william Woodworth- Samuel Woodworth-jesse Foote- Isaac Bemis-jonathan Canfield- Soldiers Of The Revolution
24	ARROW			On Nys 148 About 1½ Mis. S.w. Of Northville	Mayfield, Town Of, New York		King Cemetery Henry King And Son John Settled On This Site And Are Buried Here. Graves Of Revolutionary Soldiers And Pioneers Of 1788–1815.
25	ARROW			On Town Rd. About 1/4 Mile West Of Mayfield	Mayfield, Town Of, New York		Burying Ground Graves Of Captain Gershom Woodworth, French And Indian And Revolutionary Wars And Sergeant Selah Woodworth Of Revolution; Mayfield Pioneer.
26	ARROW			On Nys 30 At Mayfield	Mayfield, Town Of, New York		Site Of Dutch Reformed Church Of Mayfield, 1793–1826. Churchyard Containing Remains Of Many Pioneers Of This Section.
27	ARROW			On Co. Rd. About 1½ Mi. W. Mayfield	Mayfield, Town Of, New York		Woodworth Farm Conveyed By Commissioners Of Forfeiture To William G. Woodworth In 1786. Served In Revolution. Passed To Hiram Woodworth 1810–1910.
28	"FISH HOUSE"			On Co. Rd. At Northampton	Northampton, Town Of, New York		Of Sir Wm. Johnson 1500 Ft. Northeast Of This Marker Built 1762. Village Derived Name From Lodge. Burned By Tories And Indians, 1781
29	COVERED BRIDGE			On Co. Rd. At Northampton	Northampton, Town Of, New York		Erected 1818, By State, At Fish House Over Sacandaga River. D. Stewart, Builder. Jacob Shew, Assemblyman. Torn Down 1930. 2000 Ft. North
30	GODFREY SHEW			On Co. Rd. At Northampton	Northampton, Town Of, New York		First Settler Fish House Under Sir Wm. Johnson, 1762 Sons, John, Stephen, Jacob Captured In Tory & Indian Raid June 3, 1778. Taken To Canada
31	MARVIN HOUSE			On Co. Rd. At Northampton	Northampton, Town Of, New York		Built 1815 Site Sir Wm. Johnson's Fish House By David Marvin, Conn. Rev. Soldier; His Son, Dr. L.i. Marvin Assemblyman 1840 From Fulton Co. House Moved 1929.
32	SHEW HOUSE			On Co. Rd. At Northampton	Northampton, Town Of, New York		Built 1784 By Godfrey Shew And His Sons John, Stephen And Jacob After Their Return From Canada As Prisoners Of Col. Ross On June 3, 1778
33	SHEW'S HILL			On Co. Rd. At Northampton	Northampton, Town Of, New York		On June 3, 1778, Godfrey Shew Stationed His Son Jacob To Report Approach Tory And Indian Raiders Under Co. Ross. Later Family Made Prisoners.
34	ST JOHN HOUSE			On Co. Rd. At Northampton	Northampton, Town Of, New York		Built 1795 By Alex. St. John On Confiscated Lands Of Col. Guy Johnson, Nephew Of Sir William Johnson

== See also ==
- List of New York State Historic Markers
- National Register of Historic Places listings in New York
- List of National Historic Landmarks in New York
