= List of New York State Historic Markers in Montgomery County, New York =

This is an incomplete list of New York State Historic Markers in Montgomery County, New York.

== Listings county-wide ==
	Marker name	Image	Date designated	Location	City or Town	Coords	Marker text
1	250 FEET S.			On Nys 5 At West End Of Amsterdam	Amsterdam, City Of, New York		Claus Masion Built 1762 By Sir Wm. Johnson For His Daughter Nancy Stood Between River And Present Railroad
2	GUY PARK, 1766			On Nys 5 At Amsterdam	Amsterdam, City Of, New York		Built By Sir William Johnson For Daughter, Molly, Wife Of Col. Guy Johnson. Johnsons Left For Canada In 1775.
3	OLD MANNY INN			On Nys 5 At East End Of Amsterdam	Amsterdam, City Of, New York		Was On Lot 8, Sub-division Of Lot 1 Of The 13Th Patent. Sold To Gabriel Manny 1804. Came Into Possession Of Ross Family In 1839.
4	1ST CHURCH			On Main St. In Hagaman	Amsterdam, Town Of, New York		In Hagaman Erected In 1835 As Presbyterian North Joined Classis Mount 1855. Is Now A Reformed Church.
5	A FAMOUS INN			On Nys 5 About 2½ Milse East Of Cranesville	Amsterdam, Town Of, New York		Here, 1795–1845, Stood The Hotel Of John Van Eps Who Fought At Oriskany. Here Commodore Perry And Other Notables Were Entertained.
6	ADRIUCHA			On Nys 5 At Cranesville	Amsterdam, Town Of, New York	42°54′48.89″N 74°7′20.86″W	De Groot Family Settled Here About 1700, Mill Built About 1710
7	CEMETERY-1774			On Pawling St. At Hagaman	Amsterdam, Town Of, New York		Owned By Joseph Hagaman Was Named. Cemetery Restored In 1927. 7 Revolutionary Soldiers Are Buried Here
8	COMPAANEN KILL			On Nys 5 About 2 Miles East Of Cranesville	Amsterdam, Town Of, New York		Near Here, According To Tradition, Is The Grave Of Copaan The Oneida, Who At West Canada Creek, 1781, Tomahawked Walter Butler.
9	EVASKILL			On Nys 5 At Cranesville	Amsterdam, Town Of, New York		Named After Mrs. Eva Van Alstyne Who Was Scalped Here 1755.
10	FORT JOHNSON, 1749			On Nys 5 At Fort Johnson	Amsterdam, Town Of, New York		Third Mohawk Valley House Built By Sir William Johnson. Important Military Post And Indian Council Place Of 1754-60
11	JOHNSON TRAIL			On Nys 67 At Fort Johnson	Amsterdam, Town Of, New York		Used By Sir Wm. Johnson 1742–1774 Between Fort Johnson And Johnson Hall. A Bi-centennial In 1938 Celebrated His Arrival In America.
12	MANNY'S CORNERS			On Nys 67 At Manny's Corners	Amsterdam, Town Of, New York		Cemetery-about 1790 Contains Graves Of Four Revolutionary Soldiers
13	OLD HAGAMAN			In Cemetery About 75 Ft. West Of Pawling St. At Hagaman	Amsterdam, Town Of, New York		Cemetery-1774 Abandoned For Many Years Restored By Lewis E. Harrower In 1927. Cared For By Town Of Amsterdam
14	CANAJOHARIE			On Nys 10 At S. End Canajoharie	Canajoharie, Town Of, New York		Name Means "Pot That Washes Itself" The Pot Hole Is In Bed Of Creek Below At Entrance To Canajoharie Gorge
15	CLINTON CAMP			On Nys 163 About 1/2 Mile North Of Sprout Brook	Canajoharie, Town Of, New York		June 1779 Of Col. Weissenfels' 4Th New York Regiment Guarding Army's Portage March To Otsego Lake
16	CLINTON CAMP			On Erie Blvd., Canajoharie	Canajoharie, Town Of, New York		June 1779 Of Col. Gansevoort's 3Rd New York Regiment Guarding Army's Portage March To Otsego Lake
17	FLINT			On Nys 163 At Sprout Brook	Canajoharie, Town Of, New York	42°51′01.5″N 74°40′46.5″W	Homesite Robert Flint-pioneer And Lieutenant French And Indian Wars. Cornelius Flint-soldier Revolution
18	FORT FAILING			On Nys 5S About 3/4 Mile West Of Canajoharie	Canajoharie, Town Of, New York		1770 Place Of Refuge And Home Of Col. Hendrick Frey
19	SITE OF			At Intersection Cliff & Otsego Sts. Canajoharie	Canajoharie, Town Of, New York		Canajoharie Academy, 1824-92 Susan B. Anthony Taught Here 1846–1848. Charles F. Wheelock, Prin., 1880–91
20	SITE OF			On Nys 10 At Canajoharie	Canajoharie, Town Of, New York		Johannes Reuff'a Tavern Built 1750 By Hendrick Schrembling Became Reuff's Tavern In 1778 Gen. James Clinton's Hdqts 1779 Gen. Washington Visited Here 1783 Recruiting Office 1812, Demolished 1850
21	SULLIVAN-CLINTON			On Nys 10 At S. End Canajoharie	Canajoharie, Town Of, New York		Campaign 1779 Portage Route Of General James Clinton's Army Canajoharie To Otsego Lake 2000 Men, 500 Wagons, 200 Bateaux And Supplies Moved Overland
22	VAN ALSTYNE HOMESTEAD			On Moyer St., Canajoharie	Canajoharie, Town Of, New York		Built 1749 By Martin J. Van Alstyne 16 Of 31 Meetings Of Tryon County Safety Committee Held Here 1774-75 General Nicholas Herkimer Received Commission As Brig. Gen Here 1775
23	ARROW			On County Rd. About 4 Miles Southwest Of Canajoharie	Canajoharie, Town Of, New York		Clinton Road Route Of Gen. Clinton's American Army Of 2000 Men, 500 Wagons, 200 Bateaux, Portage Canajoharie-otsego Lake 1779
24	BAPTIST			On County Rd., Charleston	Charleston, Town Of, New York		Church Erected 1793 Elijah Herrick 1St Pastor
25	CHRISTIAN			On County Rd. At Charleston Four Corners	Charleston, Town Of, New York		Church Erected In 1813 James Wilson First Pastor Elder John Ross Pastor 1822–1872
26	GRAVE OF			On Nys 148 About 1/2 Mile Southwest Of Charleston	Charleston, Town Of, New York		Samuel Tallmadge Born Brookhaven, L.i., Nov. 23, 1755-Died April. 1, 1825 Lieutenant And Adjutant In American Revolution
27	GRAVE OF			On Nys 148 About 1/2 Mile Southwest Of Charleston	Charleston, Town Of, New York		William Mc Conkey Jan 22, 1744-Sept. 10, 1825 Owner Of Ferry On Delaware River On Which Washington Crossed Dec. 25, 1776
28	GRIST MILL			On Town Rd., Burtonville	Charleston, Town Of, New York		Erected 1850 By Judah Burton Son Of The 1St Settlers
29	HOME OF			On County Rd. About 2 Mis. W. Of Charleston	Charleston, Town Of, New York		Lieut. Samuel Tallmadge Erected About 1800 Replaced Log Cabin Built About 1789
30	"YANKEE STREET"			On Nys 30 At Minaville	Florida, Town Of, New York		Surveyed In 1795, "Six Rods Wide, Straight Course S.e. From Creek To Division Line Between Warren & Remsen Patents," Now Schuyler's Corner
31	ASSOCIATE CHURCH			On Town Rd. At Scotch Church	Florida, Town Of, New York		Organized About 1786 By Associate Presbytery Of Pennsylvania. 1St Ministers: Mairs, Banks, Donaldson, Campbell. 1St Church Built 1800
32	JAN WEMP (WEMPLE)			On Town Rd. About 1/2 Mile N/e Of Fort Hunter	Florida, Town Of, New York		Early Settler, Obtained From Mohawk Indians 450 Acres Of Land In 1737. Was One Of Contractors Who Built Queen Anne Chapel & Old Fort Hunter
33	JOHNSON'S			On Nys 5S About 1/4 Mile East Of Amsterdam	Florida, Town Of, New York		1738–1742 Site Of First Mohawk Valley Home And Trading Post Of Sir William Johnson
34	NEAR THIS SPOT STOOD THE			On Nys 5S About 1/4 Mile East Of Amsterdam	Florida, Town Of, New York		Trading House Of William Johnson (Later Sir William) Agent For Warrenbush Pat. 1734
35	PETER YOUNG			On Co. Rd., E. Side Schoharie Creek About 1 3/3 Mi. S.e	Florida, Town Of, New York		Settled 1726 Near Young's Lake. Granted First Lease Of Land In Warrensbush By Sir Peter Warren, Oct. 7, 1736.
36	QUEEN ANNE			On Town Rd. About 1/2 Mile East Of Fort Hunter	Florida, Town Of, New York		Parsonage Built 1712 For Use Of Missionaries To Mohawk Indians. Here In 1775 Rev. J. Stuart & J. Brant Translated In Mohawk The Gospel Of St. Mark.
37	SITE OF			On Town Rd. At Fort Hunter	Florida, Town Of, New York		Queen Anne Chapel Built 1711-12 For Use Of Mohawk Indians. Torn Down 1821 To Make Way For Erie Canal
38	SITE OF			On County Rd. About 2 Miles Southwest Of Minaville	Florida, Town Of, New York		Log Meeting House Warrensbush Church, Erected 1778, First Methodist Church In Mohawk Valley. Rev. J. Dempster, Pastor, 1778–1804.
39	SITE OF FIRST BRIDGE			On Town Rd. At Fort Hunter	Florida, Town Of, New York	42°56′21.34″N 74°16′54.88″W	First Bridge Built By Isaac Deput Across Schoharie Creek, 1796–97. Partially Destroyed By Ice Feb. 23, 1814
40	SITE OF			On County Rd. About 2 Miles Southeast Of Minaville	Florida, Town Of, New York		Remsen's Bush Dutch Church Built About 1784 On Land Donated By L. Shuler, Rev. T. Romeyn Only Settled Pastor. New Church In N Minaville, 1808.
41	SITE OF			On Co. Rd., E. Side Schoharie Creek, 1 Mi, S.e. Mill Pt.	Florida, Town Of, New York		Frederick's Mill At End Of Lane Philip Frederick And Francis Saltz Leased Land And Built Mill, 1750.
42	SITE OF			On Town Rd. At Fort Hunter	Florida, Town Of, New York		T-can-de-ro-ga Or Ten-on-on-to-gen. Lower Castle Mohawks' Wolf Clan Last Mohawk Indian Village In Valley, 1700–1775
43	SITE OF			On Town Rd. At Fort Hunter	Florida, Town Of, New York		Old Fort Hunter Built 1711-12 By Order Of Gov. Hunter For Protection Of Mohawk Indians. Was Stockaded And Surrounded Queen Anne Chapel
44	SITE OF PIONEER			On Tn. Rd. Near Bridge Over So. Chuctanunda Cr. About 1½ Mis. Southwest	Florida, Town Of, New York		Warrensbush Village 1770–1810 Had Saw And Grist Mill Below Bridge On Creek Bend, A Prosperous Village, Destroyed In Indian Raids, 1781.
45	STANTONS FORD			On Nys 5S About 1/4 Mile East Of Amsterdam	Florida, Town Of, New York		Where Ross & Butler Crossed With 700 Tories Indians And British October 24, 1781 Last Great Raid In County
46	WILGEN VLACKTE			On Nys 5S About 2 Miles East Of Amsterdam	Florida, Town Of, New York		Willow Flats Settled By Claus Willemse Van Coppernowl. Then Westernmost Location 1684
47	ARROW			On Nys 30 About 1 Mile S. Of Minaville	Florida, Town Of, New York		First Town Meeting Held At Home Of Ezra Murray First Tues. In April, 1794, Murray Lived At End Of Road At Foot Of Bean Hill, On Present Bussing Farm.
48	ANDAGORON			On Nys 5S About 2 Mis. West Of Fultonville	Glen, Town Of, New York		Middle Mohawk Castle Of The Bear Clan 1642 Located On Hill Top. Destroyed In De Tracy's Raid Of 1666
49	BLOCK HOUSE			On Nys 5S At Fultonville	Glen, Town Of, New York		Erected On This Site Near Close Of Revolution
50	CROMWELL HOME			On Town Rd. About 1/2 Mile South Of Stone Ridge	Glen, Town Of, New York		Built About 1778 By Philip Cromwell, Surgeon Tryon County Militia
51	FIRST SCHOOL			On Nys 5S About 3/4 Mi. West Auriesville	Glen, Town Of, New York		In The Town Of Glen Was Located Here In 1797 In The Home Of Abraham D. Quackenbush. John Hazzard, Teacher
52	GANDAWAGUE			On Nys 5S About 3/4 Mi. West Auriesville	Glen, Town Of, New York		Lower Mohawk Indian Castle Of The Turtle Clan 1659. Burned In De Tracy's Raid, 1666.
53	LAST COUNCIL			On Nys 5S About 1 Mi. West Of Auriesville	Glen, Town Of, New York		Of The Mohawk Indians And The Tryon County Committee Of Safety Was Held Here On The Flats October 1775
54	OSSERNENON			On Nys 5S Near Intersection With Nys 288	Glen, Town Of, New York		Lower Mohawk Indian Castle 1642–1659. Father Jogues And Rene Goupil Martyred Here. Tekawitha Born Here
55	STARIN TAVERN			On River St., Fultonville	Glen, Town Of, New York		Built On This Site 1755 Western Terminus Of Albany Post Road 1795 Mail Carried Weekly From Here To Johnstown
56	VAN EPPS HOME			On Nys 5S At E. End Of Fultonville	Glen, Town Of, New York		First Home Built Here 1751 By John E. Van Epps Pioneer Settler In Fultonville Then Known As Van Epps Swamp
57	300 FT. NORTH [ARROW]			On Nys 5 About 1/2 Mile East Of St. Johnsville	Johnsville, Town Of, New York		Site Of Reformed Church 1750 First Church Organization In Town Of St. Johnsville
58	1739			On Co. Rd., Salt Springville	Minden, Town Of, New York		Ancient Salt Springs Nearby David Linsey Discovered The Spring From Which Village Was Named Source Of Pioneer Supply
59	1779			On Nys 5S About 1/4 Mile West Of Fort Plain	Minden, Town Of, New York		Clinton March Col. Lewis Dubois With 5Th New York Regt, And Artillery Left Ft. Plain For Otsego Lake, June 25, 1779
60	1779			On Co. Rd. About 1 Mile East Of Salt Springville	Minden, Town Of, New York		[Arrow] Clinton Road Portage Route Of Gen. Clinton's American Army Canajoharie To Otsego Lake 2000 Men 200 Bateaux 500 Wagons
61	CAN-A-WO-GE			On Nys 5S About 1/2 Mile West Of Fort Plain	Minden, Town Of, New York		Mohawk Village Stood On This Sand Hill Burial Ground On And About This Road 1634
62	FORT CLYDE			On Nys 163 About 1 Mile South Of Fort Plain	Minden, Town Of, New York		Strong Fort With Blockhouse Named For Col. Samuel Clyde Of Canajoharie 1777–1783
63	FORT PLAIN			On Nys 5S About 1/2 Mile West Of Fort Plain	Minden, Town Of, New York		1776–1786 Northern Limit Of Raid By Brant's Indians-tories 16 Killed-60 Captured 100 Buildings Burned Augs.2, 1780
64	FORT PLANK			On Nys 5S About 2½ Miles West Of Fort Plain	Minden, Town Of, New York		1776 Site Marks Stockaded Home Frederick Planck Military Post And Refuge 1776–1783
65	GRAVE OF			On Co. Rd. 2 Miles East Of Salt Springville	Minden, Town Of, New York		Henry Seeber Pioneer, Patriot & Revolutionary Soldier
66	INDIAN TRAIL			On Co. Rd., Salt Springville	Minden, Town Of, New York		& Military Road Covered By Clinton's Army In 1779 On March To Join Gen. Sullivan At Tioga
67	OTS-SQUA-GO			On Nys 80 At Fort Plain	Minden, Town Of, New York		Course Of Creek Changed From Point 1/2 Mile North When Erie Canal Was Constructed 1817–1825
68	OTS-TUN-GO			On Nys 80 About 2 Miles East Of Hallsville	Minden, Town Of, New York		One Of First Mohawk Castles Located About 3/4 Mile Up Otstungo 1580–1625
69	SAND HILL			On Nys 5S About 1/2 Mile West Of Fort Plain	Minden, Town Of, New York		School Site Of First School Built In This Section Before Revolution
70	SAND HILL			On Nys 5S About 1/2 Mile West Of Fort Plain	Minden, Town Of, New York		Dutch Reformed Church First Built 1750 Burned In 1780 Raid Rebuilt 1785-Torn Down 1840
71	SITE OF HOME AND GRAVE OF			On Nys 163 At Freys Bush	Minden, Town Of, New York		Sergeant John Jacob Diefendorf Born 1747-Died 1839 Served Revolution Was In Battle Of Oriskany
72	TA-RA-TO-REES			At Intersection Kellogg & Douglas Sts., Fort Plain	Minden, Town Of, New York		"Hill Of Health" Mohawk Middle Town 1700–1755
73	TE-NO-TO-GE			On Nys 5S About 2 Miles West Of Fort Plain	Minden, Town Of, New York		Largest Mohawk Indian Town Visited By Van Den Bogaert 1634 55 Houses-over 1000 People
74	1/4 MILE S.			On Nys 334 About 1/2 Mile Northwest Of Fonda	Mohawk, Town Of, New York		Tekawitha Spring Water Supply For Villages Of Caughnawaga 1667–1693 Named After The "Lily Of The Mohawks"
75	APPROACHING SITE OF OLD			On Nys 5 At Fonda	Mohawk, Town Of, New York		Caughnawaga Church Erected In 1763
76	CAMP MOHAWK			On Nys 148 About 1/2 Mile North Of Fonda	Mohawk, Town Of, New York		The "Iron Hearted Regiment" Drilled Here, Mustered Into Service Aug. 16, 1862 Under Col. Simeon Sammons
77	CAUGHNAWAGAE			On Nys 5 About 3/4 Mile West Of Fonda	Mohawk, Town Of, New York		Lower Mohawk Indian Castle 1667 Ruled By Turtle Clan. Jesuit Mission Of St. Peter's Destroyed In Raid Of 1693
78	CONNOLLY INN			On Nys 5 About 5 Mile West Of Fonda	Mohawk, Town Of, New York	42°54′43.63″N 74°27′29.66″W	Stood At Yosts Where There Was A Toll Gate And A Bridge Across The Mohawk Which Was Swept Away By High Water And Never Rebuilt
79	COURT HOUSE			On Grounds Of Old Court House, Fonda	Mohawk, Town Of, New York		Erected 1836 When Fonda Became County Seat. Scene Of Many Social Religious And Political Meetings
80	DANASCARA PLACE			On Nys 5 About 3 Mis. E., Fonda	Mohawk, Town Of, New York		Built 1795 By Col. Frederick Vischer Replacing House Which Was Burned In The Valley Raid Of 1780
81	DAVIS TAVERN			On Nys 5 At Fonda	Mohawk, Town Of, New York		Famous In Days Of Stage Coach Travel. Built About 1781 By Matthew C. Davis
82	FONDA CEMETERY			On Cemetery St. At Fonda	Mohawk, Town Of, New York	42°57′24.8″N 74°22′07.3″W	Old Caughnawaga Cemetery Village Property Since 1855 Many Early Settlers Buried Here, Also Six Revolutionary Soldiers
83	FONDA TAVERN			On Nys 5 At Fonda	Mohawk, Town Of, New York	42°57′16.09″N 74°21′31.18″W	Built About 1781 By John Fonda Of Tryon County Militia
84	LIBERTY POLE			On Nys 5 About 1/2 Mile West Of Fonda	Mohawk, Town Of, New York		Erected On This Spot Occasioned The First Blood Shed In Old Tryon County In May 1775
85	PAPPY DOUW			On Nys 334 At Fonda	Mohawk, Town Of, New York		Fonda House Built For Adam Douw Fonda On "The Winter Farm." Stood On Hilltop North And East Of Present Location
86	SITE OF			On Nys 148 About 2 Miles North Of Fonda	Mohawk, Town Of, New York		Sammons' Home Burned During Revolution And Sampson Sammons And His Three Sons Taken Prisoners. Jacob And Frederick Were Taken To Canada But Escaped After Much Suffering
87	VAN HORN HOUSE			On Nys 5 At Fonda	Mohawk, Town Of, New York		Built By Abram Van Horn In 1826. Used As A Bakery And Store.
88	VEEDER HOME			On Nys 5 About 1 Mile West Of Fonda	Mohawk, Town Of, New York		Built About 1791 By Major Abraham Veeder Who Kept An Inn Here And Operated A Ferry Across The River
89	WEMPLE TAVERN			On Nys 334 At Fonda	Mohawk, Town Of, New York		Erected 1780 By "Peggy" Wemple Revolutionary Heroine
90	ARROW 700 FEET			On Nys 148 At Fonda	Mohawk, Town Of, New York		Site Of Home Of Douw Fonda 1St Settler, After Whom Village Was Named. House Burned & Fonda Killed By Tories & Indians 1780
91	ARMY CAMP			On Nys 5 At Palatine Church	Palatine, Town Of, New York		Of Gen. Van Rensselaer's American Army, Oct. 19, 1780 Also Site Of Palatine Church 1770
92	FORT FREY			On Nys 5 Palatine Bridge	Palatine, Town Of, New York		1739 Home Of Maj. John Frey Hendrick Frey Location At Foot Of Hill 1689 British Fort Nearby 1701–1713
93	FORT WAGNER			On Nys 5 About 1 Mile Northwest Of Nelliston	Palatine, Town Of, New York		Stone Section Of House Was Stockaded Home Of Lt. Col. Peter Wagner Palatine Regt. Tryon County Militia 1750
94	LOUCKS TAVERN			On Nys 10 At Stone Arabia	Palatine, Town Of, New York		Site Of First Meeting Place Palatine District Committee Of Safety August 27, 1774
95	SETTLED BY HENDRICK FREY 1689			On Nys 5 Palatine Bridge	Palatine, Town Of, New York		Bridge Built 1803 Village Chartered 1867 Settled By Palatine Germans 1689–1867
96	SITE OF THE EARLY HOME OF			On Nys 5 About 4 Miles East Of Palatine Bridge	Palatine, Town Of, New York		Major Jelles Fonda A Prominent Merchant By The Mohawk Valley And An Indian Trader. Here Was Located An Indian Village
97	SPRAKER INN			On Nys 5 About 2 Miles East Of Palatine Bridge	Palatine, Town Of, New York		Built In 1795 By The Spraker Family Once Famous A River And Turnpike Tavern
98	STONE ARABIA			On Nys 10 About 3 Miles North Of Palatine Bridge	Palatine, Town Of, New York		Lutheran Church 1792 Also Site Of Log Church 1729 Settled By Palatines 1712
99	STONE ARABIA			On Nys 10 About 2 Miles North Of Palatine Bridge	Palatine, Town Of, New York		Battlefield Lies East Of Road Col. Brown's American Battalion Defeated Oct. 19, 1780
100	CURRYTOWN			On Nys 162 At Currytown	Root, Town Of, New York		Reformed Church Organized 1790. Previous Services Held In Barn Of Jacob Dievendorf. First Pastor Rev. J.r.h. Hasbrouck
101	HOME OF			On County Rd. At Randall	Root, Town Of, New York		Volkert Vrooman Where According To Tradition Washington Stayed Overnight On His Visit Through The Valley
102	RAIDER'S CAMP			On Nys 5S About 5½ Miles W. Of Fultonville	Root, Town Of, New York		October 18, 1780 Camp Of Sir John Johnson's Indian-tory Raiders
103	THIS VICINITY RAIDED BY			On Nys 162 About 1½ Miles N.w. Of Rural Grove	Root, Town Of, New York		Tories And Indians On July 9, 1781 Fort Lewis Formed A Refuge

== See also ==
- List of New York State Historic Markers
- National Register of Historic Places listings in New York
- List of National Historic Landmarks in New York
