= List of New York State Historic Markers in Schoharie County, New York =

This is an incomplete list of New York State Historic Markers in Schoharie County, New York.

== Listings county-wide ==
	Marker name	Image	Date designated	Location	City or Town	Marker text
1	The Presbyterian (Old Stone) Church		1932	Church Street	Esperance	The Presbyterian (Old Stone) Church Esperance, N.Y. was organized on May 2, 1823. The edifice was dedicated July 4, 1824. Sheldon Jackson was received as a member on October 2, 1853. Remodeled and rededicated January 14, 1897. State Education Department 1932
2	Blenheim Bridge		1935	Route 30	Blenheim	Blenheim Bridge is the longest single-span wooden bridge in the world. It was built by the Blenheim Bridge Company and incorporated in 1828. The bridge is the last of its kind in the region. State Education Department 1935
3	Gilboa Settlement		1949		Gilboa	Gilboa Settlement, Cotton Mill 1840-1869. Tannery, Church & Cemetery stood on ground now covered by reservoir of New York City water supply. State Education Department 1949
4	Weiser's Dorf		1932		Middleburgh	Weiser's Dorf First Settlement in Schoharie County was founded in 1712 by John G. Weiser as a home for Palatines. State Education Department 1932
5	First School	Historical marker noting the location of the first school in Schoharie, NY	1932	Main Street	Schoharie, New York	Site of First School in Schoharie Village. Built Around 1740. State Education Department 1932

== See also ==
- List of New York State Historic Markers
- National Register of Historic Places listings in New York
- List of National Historic Landmarks in New York
