= List of New York State Historic Markers in Genesee County, New York =

This is a complete list of New York State Historic Markers in Genesee County, New York.

== Listings county-wide ==
	Marker name	Image	Date designated	Location	City or Town	Marker text
1	Fork of Great Central Trail			On Meadville R. at Tonawanda Creek.	Alabama, New York	Dating from 16th century, SW branch to Buffalo, NW branch to Lewiston. Dedicated Sept. 7, 1931.
2	Homestead of Ely Parker			On Ledge Rd. about 2 miles southwest of Basom.	Alabama, New York	Secretary to General Grant, born in 1828, died in 1895. Sachem of the Wolf Clan, Seneca title Do-ne-ho-ga-wa.
3	Seat of Holland Land Office			On NYS 5 in City of Batavia.	Batavia, New York	This city was founded in 1801 by Joseph Ellicott, Local agent of Holland Land Company.
4	Ganson Tavern			On NYS 5 at Leroy Village line.	Leroy, New York	First settlement between Genesee River and Buffalo. Tavern conducted by Charles Wilbur 1793, Capt. John Ganson 1797.
5	Leroy House			On NYS 5 in Village of Leroy.	Leroy, New York	Built before 1812 as a land office for the triangle tract. Deeded to Union Free School District, 1911.

== See also ==
- List of New York State Historic Markers
- National Register of Historic Places listings in New York
- List of National Historic Landmarks in New York
