= List of New York State Historic Markers in Wyoming County, New York =

This is a complete list of New York State Historic Markers in Wyoming County, New York.

== Listings county-wide ==
	Marker name	Image	Date designated	Location	City or Town	Marker text
1	First Presbyterian Church of Middlebury			On NY 19 In Wyoming	Middlebury, New York	First Presbyterian Church of Middlebury organized with 15 members June 14, 1817
2	West Middlebury Baptist Church			On Co. Rd. 47 In Hamlet Of West Middlebury	West Middlebury, New York	West Middlebury Baptist Church organized with 17 members March 11, 1811. Present building dedicated June 21, 1832.
2	Log House			On Tn. Rd. About 9 Miles West Of Varysburg	Sheldon, New York	Here stood a log house built in 1807, home Of Ziba Hamilton physician of Holland Land Co., surgeon in War Of 1812, Pioneer Settler.
2	Turner's Corners			On US 20A about 4½ Miles West Of Varysburg	Sheldon, New York	Turner's Corners pioneer outpost 1804 on Indian Trail from Portage to Lake Erie.

== See also ==
- List of New York State Historic Markers
- National Register of Historic Places listings in New York
- List of National Historic Landmarks in New York
