= List of New York State Historic Markers in Schuyler County, New York =

This is an incomplete list of New York State Historic Markers in Schuyler County, New York.

== Listings county-wide ==
| | Marker name | Image | Date designated | Location | City or Town | Coords | Marker text |
|---|---|---|---|---|---|---|---|
| 1 | CATHARINE M.E. CHURCH | | | On County Rd. In Catharine | Catharine, Town Of, New York | | On Site Of Earlier Edifice Which Was The First Church Building In County Erected 1807 |
| 2 | JANE A. DELANO | | | In Front Of Grange Hall At Townsend | Dix, Town Of, New York | | Founder American Red Cross Nursing Service, 1909 Born In Townsend March 12, 1862 |
| 3 | CAMP SITE | | | On Nys 414 At Hector | Hector, Town Of, New York | | Gen. Hand's Light Corps Camp, Extending West Here Sullivan-clinton Campaign September 3, 1779 |
| 4 | CAMP SITE | | | On Town Rd. About 1 Mile Southwest Of Hector | Hector, Town Of, New York | | Gen. Clinton's Camp, Line East-west Sullivan-clinton Campaign September 3, 1779 |
| 5 | CAMP SITE | | | On Town Rd. About 1 Mile South Of Hector | Hector, Town Of, New York | | Gen. Maxwell's Brigade Camp Extending North Here Sullivan-clinton Campaign September 3, 1779 |
| 6 | CAMP SITE | | | On Nys 414 About 1/2 Mile South Of Hector | Hector, Town Of, New York | | Gen. Poor's Brigade Camp, Line North-south Sullivan-clinton Campaign September 3, 1779 |
| 7 | CON-DAW-HAW | | | On Nys 414 At Valois | Hector, Town Of, New York | | Site Of Iroquois Village Consisting Of Cornfields Long House & Cabins Destroyed Sept. 4, 1779 By Gen. Sullivan's Troops |
| 8 | EARLY SETTLER | | | On Nys 414 N. Of Hector | Hector, Town Of, New York | | States Survey 1790 Locates Here Cabin One Masters With Twenty Acres Cleared Land |
| 9 | EPISCOPAL PARISH | | | On Nys 414 At Hector | Hector, Town Of, New York | | Consecrated Here 1830 By Bishop Hobart. Church Buildings And Support Of Rector Made Possible Through Gifts Of Elizabeth Woodward |
| 10 | FERRY | | | On Lake Shore At Valois | Hector, Town Of, New York | | Established 1805 Between This Point And Starkey By John Goodwin Chartered By State, 1820 Frank Wood, Pilot, 1867-97 |
| 11 | FIRST PRESBYTERIAN CHURCH | | | On Nys 414 At Hector | Hector, Town Of, New York | | Organized 1809 Present Edifice Built 1818 Sunday School Held Continuously Since 1813 |
| 12 | HON. HENRY FISH | | | On Nys 79 At Mecklenburg | Hector, Town Of, New York | | Homestead Built 1815-1820. First Assemblyman From Schuyler County 1858, Chairman First Board Supervisors |
| 13 | MILITARY ROUTE | | | On Nys 414 About 1/2 Mile South Of Hector | Hector, Town Of, New York | | Of The Sullivan-clinton Army On Its Campaign Against The British And Indians Of Western New York In 1779 |
| 14 | MILITARY ROUTE | | | On Nys 227 At Burdett | Hector, Town Of, New York | | Of The Sullivan-clinton Army On Its Campaign Against The British And Indians Of Western New York In 1779 |
| 15 | PREACH ORCHARD | | | On Nys 414 At Hector | Hector, Town Of, New York | | (Ga-di-odji-ya-da) Site Of Irouquois Village Gen. Sullivan Camped Here September 3, 1779 |
| 16 | SAMUEL A. SEELY ERECTED A. | | | On Nys 414 About 3 Miles North Of Watkins Glen | Hector, Town Of, New York | | Woolen Mill At This Place In 1801 The First In Schuyler County |
| 17 | SAW MILL CREEK | | | On Nys 414 At Hector | Hector, Town Of, New York | | First Saw Mill In Section Located Here. Built By Reuben Smith, 1795-6 |
| 18 | SITE OF | | | On Nys 227 At Burdett | Hector, Town Of, New York | | Oldest House In Town Of Burdette Used As Tavern, School & Masonic Hall. Contains Interesting Relics |
| 19 | SITE OF CABIN OF | | | On Nys 414 About 2 Miles South Of Hector | Hector, Town Of, New York | | William Wyckham First Settler In Town Of Hector 1791. Direct Descendant Of Earl Of Wyckham |
| 20 | WAREHOUSE | | | On Nys 414 About 3 Miles North Of Watkins Glen | Hector, Town Of, New York | | On This Site In 1823 A Vessel Loaded 70 Tons Of Wheat & Reached Port Of New York Through The Erie Canal |
| 21 | CATHERINE'S | | | On Nys 14 At Montour Falls | Montour, Town Of, New York | | Landing 1St Store & Inn In Region Located Here 1805 At Head Of Lake Navigation |
| 22 | FIRST ROAD | | | On Nys At Montour Falls | Montour, Town Of, New York | | In Schuyler County Built June, 1799 From Present Owega St. Bridge To Spenser. Known as The Cath. Spenser Turnpike |
| 23 | MILITARY ROUTE | | | On Nys 14 Just South Of Montour Falls | Montour, Town Of, New York | | Of The Sullivan-clinton Army On Its Campaign Against The British And Indians Of Western New York In 1779 |
| 24 | SHE-QUA-GA | | | On Genesee St. In Montour | Montour, Town Of, New York | | "Tumbling Waters" A Sketch Now In The Louvre Made About 1820 By Louis Philippe Later King Of France |
| 25 | UNDERGROUND | | | On Nys 14 About 3 Miles North Of Watkins Glen | Reading, Town Of, New York | | Railroad Luther Leveland And Wife Sheltered Fugitive Slaves Here, And Helped Them On Their Way To Canada |
| 26 | SITE OF | | | On County Rd. About 1/2 Mile West Of Weston | Tyrone, Town Of, New York | | Pre-historic Indian Village Oldest Found In New York Estimated To Date From 1000 B.c. |

== See also ==
- List of New York State Historic Markers
- National Register of Historic Places listings in New York
- List of National Historic Landmarks in New York
