= List of New York State Historic Markers in Cattaraugus County, New York =

This is a complete list of New York State Historic Markers in Cattaraugus County, New York.

== Listings county-wide ==
	Marker name	Image	Date designated	Location	City or Town	Marker text
1	First Frame House			In Ellicottville So. Side Washington St., Between Jefferson And Madison Sts.	Ellicottville, New York	First frame house in Ellicottville, 1817. Early courts of County and meetings of Board of Supervisors held here.
2	Seneca Oil			On NYS 408 At Cattaraugus-Allegany County Line	Hinsdale, New York	Spring 1627 first petroleum discovered in America 1 mi. north 1000 yds east.
3	First Frame House			On NYS 39 At Yorkshire In Yard Of Elkhorn Inn	Yorkshire, New York	First frame house in Town Of Yorkshire built in 1820 by Isaac Williams opened as tavern 1822.
4	Saw Mill and Grist Mill			On NYS 16 At Yorkshire New Olean Road	Yorkshire, New York	Saw Mill and Grist Mill first in Town Of Yorkshire. Built 1814 by Isaac Williams.

== See also ==
- List of New York State Historic Markers
- National Register of Historic Places listings in New York
- List of National Historic Landmarks in New York
