= List of New York State Historic Markers in Cortland County, New York =

This is a complete list of New York State Historic Markers in Cortland County, New York.

== Listings county-wide ==
	Marker name	Image	Date designated	Location	City or Town
1	Headwaters Of The Tioughnioga River			On Clinton Ave. In Cortland.	Chenango, New York
2	John Miller			On Nys 13 Near Homer-cortlandville Town Line.	Chenango, New York
3	Lamont Memorial			Main St. Vlge. Mcgraw Near Corner Of Church St.	Chenango, New York
4	Port Watson			City Of Cortland N.w. Bridge Tioughnioga R. At Intsctn. Port Satson St.	Chenango, New York
5	Brown Cabin			On Co. Rd. ½ I S. Of Keeney	Cuyler, New York
6	Campfire Site			On Tn. Rd. Near Cuyler	Cuyler, New York
7	Fox Cabin			On Tn. Rd. ¼ Mi. E. Keeney	Cuyler, New York
8	Gates Cabin			On Co. Rd. 1 Mi. S.e. Cuyler	Cuyler, New York
9	Griswold Cabin			On Tn. Rd. 3 Mis. N.W. Cuyler.	Cuyler, New York
10	Keeney Cabin				Cuyler, New York
11	Lee Homestead			On Tn. Rd. 2 Mis. N. Cuyler.	Cuyler, New York
12	Pioneer Church			On Tn. Rd. 2½ Mis. N. Cuyler	Cuyler, New York
13	Pioneer Home			On Tn. Rd. Near Cuyler	Cuyler, New York
14	Site Of Potter Cabin			On Tn. Rd. L ½ Mis. S.W. Cuyler.	Cuyler, New York
15	Site Of Corey Cabin			On Lincklaen St., Cuyler.	Cuyler, New York
16	Site Of Moss Cabin			On Tn. Rd. At Cuyler.	Cuyler, New York
17	Site Of Whitmarsh Cabin			On Co. Rd. ¾ Mi. S. Of Keeney.	Cuyler, New York
18	Birthplace Of Frank B. Carpenter			On Us 11 3 Mis. North Of Homer.	Homer, New York
19	Thomas Gould Alvord, Sr.			At Intrsctn. Nys 41 & 41a.	Homer, New York
20	Eli De Voe			At Intrsctn. Nys 41 & 41a.	Homer, New York
21	John Albright			On Nys 13 At East Homer.	Homer, New York
22	Salisbury-Pratt Homestead			On Nys 281 ½ Mi. S. Little York.	Homer, New York
23	Site Of The First Log Cabin Schoolhouse			On Nys 41 2 Mis. N.w. Homer.	Homer, New York
24	Baltimore Tannery And Shoe Shop			On Us 11 1½ Mis. E. Preble	Preble, New York
25	First Church			On US. 11 2 Mis. N.E. Preble.	Preble, New York
26	First School			On Co. Rd. 2 Mis. E. Preble.	Preble, New York
27	Methodist Episcopal Church			On Co. Rd. At Preble.	Preble, New York
28	Presbyterian Church			On Co. Rd. ½ Mi. E. Of Preble.	Preble, New York
29	Site Of Old Log Church			On Tn. Rd. At Preble.	Preble, New York
30	Slab City			On Us 11 2½ Mis. S.e. Preble.	Preble, New York
31	William Van Denburg			On Nys 281 In Preble.	Preble, New York
32	First State Road			On Nys 90 In Virgil.	Virgil, New York
33	First School House			On Co. Rd. 1¼ Mis. S.w. Of Virgil.	Virgil, New York
34	Nathan Boughton			On Co. Rd. 2½ Mis. S.w. Of Virgil.	Virgil, New York

== See also ==
- List of New York State Historic Markers
- National Register of Historic Places listings in New York
- List of National Historic Landmarks in New York
