= List of New York State Historic Markers in Allegany County, New York =

This is a complete list of New York State Historic Markers in Allegany County, New York.

== Listings county-wide ==
	Marker name	Image	Date designated	Location	City or Town	Marker text
1	Triangle No. 1			On Town Road About 1/4 Mi. Southwest Of Petrolia	Alma, New York	First oil well drilled in Allegany County drilled by O.P. Taylor 1879
2	First House			On Mill Street In Canaseraga	Burns, New York	First House in Canaseraga built on this site by Samuel Boylan in 1806
3	Site Of First School House			On NYS 70 About 1/2 Mile West Of Canaseraga	Burns, New York	Site of First School House in Town Of Burns erected 1810 David Crook, First Teacher
4	Cuba Lake			On NYS 305 About 1 Mile North Of Village Of Cuba	Cuba, New York	Summit level feeder for Old Genesee Valley Canal, formed, 1856, by building a 60 foot dam across the stream called Oil Creek

== See also ==
- List of New York State Historic Markers
- National Register of Historic Places listings in New York
- List of National Historic Landmarks in New York
