= List of New York State Historic Markers in Delaware County, New York =

This is an incomplete list of New York State Historic Markers in Delaware County, New York. A fuller list is available from the Association of Public Historians of New York State.

== Listings county-wide ==
#	Marker Name	Image	Designator	Location	City or Town	Coords	Marker Text
1	DOWNSVILLE COVERED BRIDGE (north end)	Historic marker of Downsville Bridge, north side	Downsville Women's Club (no date but must be 1998 or later)	North side of Downsville Bridge	Downsville	42°04′35.16″N 74°59′27.81″W	DOWNSVILLE COVERED BRIDGE BUILT IN 1854 BY ROBERT MURRAY; TO SPAN 174' OF THE EAST BRANCH; AT A COST OF $1700. RESTORED IN; 1998 FOR $1,000,000 AS A TRIBUTE; TO THE SKILLS OF THE PAST
2	DOWNSVILLE COVERED BRIDGE (south end)	Historic marker of Downsville Bridge, south side	Downsville Women's Club (no date but must be 1999 or later)	South side of Downsville Bridge	Downsville	42°04′33.74″N 74°59′25.55″W	DOWNSVILLE COVERED BRIDGE HAS BEEN PLACED ON THE NATIONAL; REGISTER OF HISTORIC PLACES; BY THE UNITED STATES DEPARTMENT; OF THE INTERIOR MAY 20, 1999
3	HOMESTEAD OF DR PLATT TOWNSEND	Historic marker for Dr Platt Townsend	State Ed Dept, 1938	Intersection of Delaware Street and West Brook	Walton	42°10′09.41″N 75°08′02.25″W	HOMESTEAD OF DR PLATT TOWNSEND BUILT 1796 LEADER OF; THE FOUNDERS OF WALTON.
4	TURNPIKE	Historic marker for Turnpike	State Ed Dept, 1949	Intersection of Delaware St, Prospect St. and Highway 206	Walton	42°10′14.55″N 75°08′19.71″W	TURNPIKE HISTORIC ROUTE FROM KINGSTON TO JERICHO (BAINBRIDGE)
5	WALTON COVERED BRIDGE	Walton Covered Bridge	(no date or agency)	North and South Side of the Bridge	Walton	42°10′01.78″N 75°07′48.57″W	WALTON COVERED BRIDGE 1846–1887
6	MIDDLETOWN SETTLEMENT	Middletown founding sign	(no date or agency)	NY State 28, east of the hospital	Walton	42°08′48.15″N 74°38′17.19″W	MIDDLETOWN SETTLEMENT 3 HUDSON VALLEY DUTCH; FAMILIES ARRIVED IN 1763 TO; SETTLE THE DELAWARE VALLEY; WHERE THE LENNI LENAPE; FIRST HUNTED AND FISHED
7	OLD STONE SCHOOLHOUSE	Old Stone Schoolhouse sign, by roadside	(no date or agency)	NY State 28, at Huckleberry Brook	Margaretville	42°07′19.25″N 74°40′28.53″W	OLD STONE SCHOOLHOUSE DISTRICT #10, DUNRAVEN, NY; TOWN OF MIDDLETOWN; BUILT IN 1920; LISTED IN THE NATIONAL AND STATE; REGISTER OF HISTORIC PLACES
8	STONE SCHOOL HOUSE	Old Stone School House sign, by school	State Ed Dept, 1932	NY State 28, at Huckleberry Brook	Margaretville	42°07′20.15″N 74°40′31.22″W	STONE SCHOOL HOUSE BUILT IN 1820; REBUILT IN 1860; DISTRICT NO. 10; TOWN OF MIDDLETOWN

== See also ==
- List of New York State Historic Markers
- National Register of Historic Places listings in New York
- List of National Historic Landmarks in New York
- National Register of Historic Places listings in Delaware County, New York
