= List of New York State Historic Markers =

This is a list of New York State Historic Markers by county. There are over 2800 historical markers in New York State. The program was started in 1926 to commemorate the Sesquicentennial of the Revolutionary War and was discontinued in 1966. It was managed under the Department of the Education’s State History Office.

Unlike many other states, New York State does not currently manage a historical marker program. Instead, local authorities are responsible for the approval, installation, and maintenance of historical markers.

Contents: Counties in New York Manhattan is New York County; Brooklyn is Kings County; Staten Island is Richmond County
Albany - Allegany - Bronx - Broome - Cattaraugus - Cayuga - Chautauqua - Chemung - Chenango - Clinton - Columbia - Cortland - Delaware - Dutchess - Erie - Essex - Franklin - Fulton - Genesee - Greene - Hamilton - Herkimer - Jefferson - Kings - Lewis - Livingston - Madison - Monroe - Montgomery - Nassau - New York - Niagara - Oneida - Onondaga - Ontario - Orange - Orleans - Oswego - Otsego - Putnam - Queens - Rensselaer - Richmond - Rockland - Saratoga - Schenectady - Schoharie - Schuyler - Seneca - St. Lawrence - Steuben - Suffolk - Sullivan - Tioga - Tompkins - Ulster - Warren - Washington - Wayne - Westchester - Wyoming - Yates

== Numbers of markers ==
Approximate tallies of markers in New York and its 62 counties follow. The approximate counts are the best available; there may be additions to the listings that are not reflected here, and the counts here may not be perfectly updated.

	County	Approximate count of historic markers
1	Albany	160
2	Allegany	4
3	Bronx	25
4	Broome	3
5	Cattaraugus	4
6	Cayuga	176
7	Chautauqua	29
8	Chemung	25
9	Chenango	15
10	Clinton	30
11	Columbia	148
12	Cortland	34
13	Delaware	5
14	Dutchess	103
15	Erie	9
16	Essex	127
17	Franklin	35
18	Fulton	34
19	Genesee	5
20	Greene	43
21	Hamilton	0
22	Herkimer	37
23	Jefferson	30
24	Kings	4
25	Lewis	0
26	Livingston	45
27	Madison	43
28	Monroe	43
29	Montgomery	105
30	Nassau	34
31	New York	36
32	Niagara	24
33	Oneida	108
34	Onondaga	81
35	Ontario	31
36	Orange	132
37	Orleans	0
38	Oswego	36
39	Otsego	40
40	Putnam	33
41	Queens	17
42	Rensselaer	36
43	Richmond	10
44	Rockland	37
45	Saratoga	114
46	Schenectady	55
47	Schoharie	52
48	Schuyler	26
49	Seneca	40
50	St. Lawrence	29
51	Steuben	10
52	Suffolk	110
53	Sullivan	41
54	Tioga	37
55	Tompkins	76
56	Ulster	152
57	Warren	11
58	Washington	68
59	Wayne	35
60	Westchester	56
61	Wyoming	4
62	Yates	7
	TOTAL	2,891
