= List of New York State Historic Markers in Jefferson County, New York =

This is an incomplete list of New York State Historic Markers in Jefferson County, New York.

== Listings county-wide ==
	Marker name	Image	Date designated	Location	City or Town	Coords	Marker text
1	BABCOCK HOMESTEAD			Intersection Of Kirby and Brown Streets in Dexter	Brownville, Town Of, New York		Erected 1832-33 By Jesse Babcock; Station On Underground Railway Passing Negro Slaves Over Canadian Border
2	BROWN MANSION			On Brown Blvd. In Brownville	Brownville, Town Of, New York		Home Of Gen. Jacob Brown Commander Of Northern Frontier Forces, War Of 1812 Commanding General U.s. Army 1821 Until His Death In 1828
3	CARLETON IS.			On NYS 12E about 2 Miles east of Cape Vincent Village	Cape Vincent, Town Of, New York		Occupied By British 1774 Ft. Haldimand Built By British-irouquois 1778–79. Captured By Americans In 1812
4	CUP-AND-SAUCER			At River's Edge on west side of Real St., Cape Vincent	Cape Vincent, Town Of, New York		House Built Near This Site By Count Pierre Fancois Real In 1816 As Refuge For Napoleon. Burned 1867
5	DURING THE			At intersection Of Broadway and James St., Cape Vincent	Cape Vincent, Town Of, New York		War Of 1812 American Soldiers Were Housed In Barracks Erected Here And At The Foot Of James Street
6	FRENCH			On Town Rd. about 1 mile SW of Rosiere	Cape Vincent, Town Of, New York		Cath. Church Built Here 1832 By Early Settlers. Heroes Of Napoleon's Army & French Refugees Worshipped Here
7	KENT'S CREEK			On County Rd. about 1½ miles SW of Rosiere	Cape Vincent, Town Of, New York		Site Of First Grist Mill In The Town Of Cape Vincent Built Prior To 1809
8	MILLENS BAY			On NYS 12E at Riverview	Cape Vincent, Town Of, New York		In June 1812 Abner Hubbard With Other Americans Crossed To Carleton Island And Captured Ft. Haldimand With Its British Garrison
9	STONE HOUSE			North side of Broadway In Western Part of Cape Vincent Village	Cape Vincent, Town Of, New York		Built In 1815 By J.d. Le Ray De Chaumont Here Canadian Rebels Were Sheltered During Patriot War, 1838
10	TIBBITS POINT			At Tibbetts Point Lighthouse SW of Cape Vincent	Cape Vincent, Town Of, New York		Lighthouse First In Jefferson County Built 1827, Rebuilt 1854
11	ARROW			On NYS 12E about 3 miles SE Of Cape Vincent	Cape Vincent, Town Of, New York		Memorial Altar On Site Of Old French Catholic Church Erected By James Le Ray De Chaumont 1832
12	CHURCH BUILT 1834–35			On NYS 12 near intersection with Co. Rt. 179, Depauville	Clayton, Town Of, New York		Francis Depau Deeded Site For House Of Worship That Shall Forever At All Times Be Open And Free To The Use Of All Denominations
13	ELM FLAT CHURCH			At intersection of Co. Rd. 179 and NYS 12 about 3/4 Mi NW of Depauville	Clayton, Town Of, New York		Fory Rods To The East Stood The First Church In The Town Of Clayton A Log Building Built 1820 By The Free Will Baptists
14	ONONDAGA TRAILS			At intersection Of NYS 12 and Co. Rt. 179, Depauville	Clayton, Town Of, New York		Junction Of War Trails Between Lake Ontario And The St. Lawrence River
15	AFTER THE BATTLE OF			On NYS 3 about 2 miles N. of Oswego-Jefferson County line	Ellisburg, Town Of, New York		Big Sandy May 28, 1814 This House Was Used As A Hospital For British Soldiers
16	BONNIE VIEW			On US 11 about 2 miles north of Pierrepont Manor	Ellisburg, Town Of, New York		Birthplace And Home Of Marietta Holley 1840–1926 Author "Samantha" Novels Pen Name "Josiah Allen's Wife"
17	FAIR VIEW			On Route 193 in Woodville	Ellisburg, Town Of, New York		Bought By Ebenezer Wood 1804 Continuously Occupied By Wood Family Since That Date
18	CAMP DE			West side of NYS 3 at State-owned observation point about 4 miles SW of Sackets Harbor	Henderson, Town Of, New York		L'observation Erected By The French In 1756 Association Island
19	AUGUSTUS SACKET			At intersection Of Main and Ray streets in Sackets Harbor	Hounsfield, Town Of, New York		Pioneer Of Sacket Harbor. Brought Tract In Hounsfield 1801. 1St Judge, Jefferson Co. B. N.y. City Nov. 10, 1769 D. Albany, N.y. Apr. 29, 1827
20	BLANCHARD STAND			At intersection NYS 3 and Co. Rd. about 2 miles west of Watertown	Hounsfield, Town Of, New York		Erected Here In 1823 By Stephen Blanchard Rebuilt 1867 And Known As Half-way-house Till 1913 A Famous Country Inn
21	BLOCKHOUSE			South side of Washington St. Between Broad St. and RR, Sackets Harbor	Hounsfield, Town Of, New York		Erected In 1812 For Defense Against The British Attack Stone House The Tisdale Homestead Erected 1819
22	FORT CHAUNCEY			East side of Monroe St. north of Main St. in Sackets Harbor	Hounsfield, Town Of, New York		War Of 1812 Named For Commodore Isaac Chauncey
23	FORT KENTUCKY			South side of Washington St. near lake, Sackets Harbor	Hounsfield, Town Of, New York		War Of 1812 28 Guns Blockhouse In Center
24	FORT TOMPKINS			Intersection Main St. and road along lake shore. Property US Coast Guard, Sackets Harbor	Hounsfield, Town Of, New York		On Navy Point War Of 1812 Named For Governor Daniel D. Tompkins
25	HOME OF			North side of county road between Sackets Harbor and Jewettville	Hounsfield, Town Of, New York		Dr. Samuel Guthrie Born 1782-Died 1848 Discovered Chloroform, 1831 Invented Percussion Caps Surgeon In War Of 1812
26	SITE OF			Along lake front within Madison Barracks in Sackets Harbor	Hounsfield, Town Of, New York		Fort Pike Behind These Breastworks Was Blockhouse Erected By Americans For Defense Against British, War Of 1812
27	UNION HOTEL - APRIL 1817			At intersection of Main and Ray streets in Sackets Harbor	Hounsfield, Town Of, New York		Built By Frederic White 1St Masonic Lodge Jefferson Co. Ontario Lodge Formed April 4, 1805 Athol Lodge Formed 1818 Sackets Lodge Formed 1848
28	VIRGINIA			South side of Washington St., west of Broad St., Sackets Harbor	Hounsfield, Town Of, New York		War Of 1812 Armed With 16 Guns
29	WAR OF 1812			End of Town Rd. along lake shore, Sackets Harbor	Hounsfield, Town Of, New York		Landing Of British Daybreak, Sunday July 19, 1812
30	SITE OF			On NYS 180, LaFargeville	Orleans, Town Of, New York		First Mill Erected 1819 At Log Mills Renamed LaFargeville July 4, 1823

== See also ==
- List of New York State Historic Markers
- National Register of Historic Places listings in New York
- List of National Historic Landmarks in New York
