= New York State Historic Markers =

State historic marker program

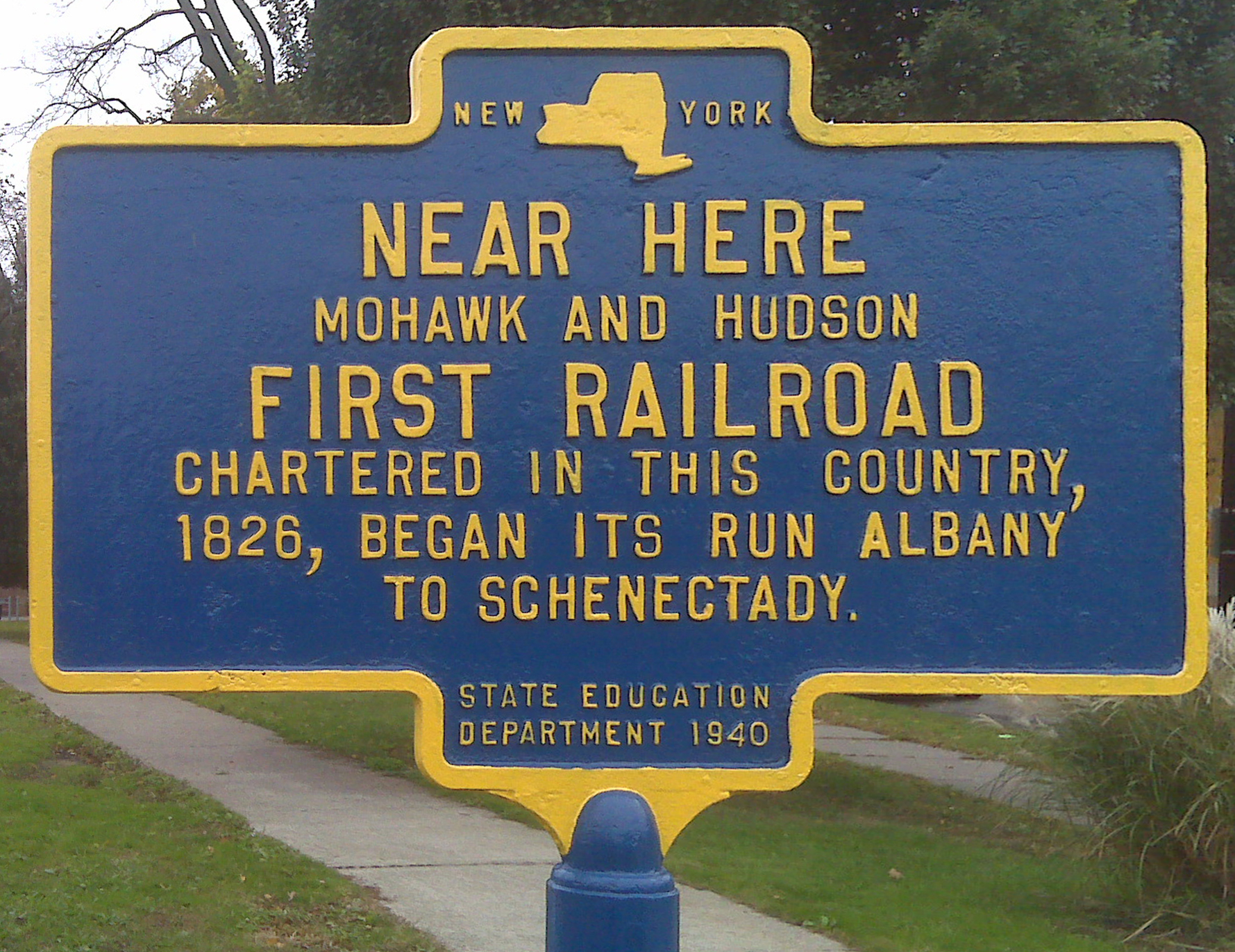
- The Mohawk and Hudson Railroad, became the first railroad chartered in New York State this historic marker was donated by New York State Education Department in 1940.
- Established: 1926
- Location: New York, United States
- Type: State/Private historic marker
- Website: www.nysm.nysed.gov/research-collections/state-history/resources/historicalmarkers

The New York State Historic Marker program was an initiative to place historical markers throughout the New York State to commemorate sites of historical significance. The program was managed by the NYS Education Department from 1926 to 1966.

These markers were first created to commemorate the American Revolution. Although no longer funded by the state, markers are still being installed throughout New York State today by individuals, town and county governments, and historical organizations.

== History ==
The State Historic Marker Program was started in 1926 by the New York State Education Department to acknowledge the sesquicentennial of the American Revolution. During the time of the program (1926–1939), over 2,800 small blue cast-iron site markers with yellow lettering were placed throughout the state of New York. In 1939, funding for the program ceased.

During the 1960s, public funding was briefly granted again for larger, more detailed signs in places such as rest areas along the state's interstate highways and thruway. These large-format "Historic Area Markers" provided visitors with cultural information in a setting along routes with heavy traffic.

The larger markers provide overviews of the history of New York, highlighting historical events and places of local significance. In 1970, a booklet was released containing all the text of the rest area markers.

Unlike many other states, New York State does not currently manage a historical marker program. Instead, local authorities are responsible for the approval, installation, and maintenance of historical markers. Anyone interested in placing or repairing a marker should thus check with appropriate county, city, town, or village historians or officials.

== History of operations ==
During the early period of the historic markers (1926–1939), the State Historian [SED] dispersed applications throughout the state to be reviewed and approved. The State then paid for the casting of the markers and planned their installation. Records of these markers were kept, and are available from the State Archives.

During the 1960s–1970s, installation of historic markers was encouraged at the county and town levels, SED approval was necessary. Since no state funding was available during this period, private funds had to be obtained. Signs were required to be cast at the Walton East Branch Foundry; this was the only place that had the molds for the markers already cast. The foundry required a letter from the state notifying them of the approval before production of the sign would begin. This ensured no markers would be created without the State's approval.

Throughout the 1980s, restrictions imposed by the SED mandate caused the process to be revised. In the 21st century you must supply fact sheets to the field so that the marker may be entered into the data base of county listings of existing markers. Still today there is much interest in erecting new markers and replacing old ones. Grants such as those given out by the William G. Pomeroy Foundation provide funding for new markers.

The foundry supplies as many as 75–100 orders a year. Unless erected on state land, permission to erect a marker is no longer required. Thus the current data base lacks some markers erected after the 1970s.

== William G. Pomeroy Foundation ==
The William G. Pomeroy Foundation is a private foundation that promotes the importance of local historic preservation and the roles markers play in all towns across the state of New York. These markers can provide much-needed economic assistance to small towns and villages where the markers are erected. As of 2024, the program recognizes historic people, places and events from 1683 to 1925 by providing grants to build new historic markers.

The Foundation unveiled its Historic Roadside Marker Program in 2006 to place markers in towns and villages within Onondaga County. In 2010, the program grew to other New York counties, including Cayuga County, Cortland County, Madison County, and Oswego County, as possible grant recipients. The next year the program expanded to include Erie County and Genesee County. In April 2012 the program began including all municipalities and not-for-profit organizations as eligible grant recipients. As of November 2024, the William G. Pomeroy Foundation reported funding over 1,100 historic markers in all 62 New York counties. In later years their program extended to other U.S. States and funded several thousands of markers.

== Today ==
As of February 2026, the New York Historic markers play a large role in educating the public as well as tourists of historic events. The William G. Pomeroy Foundation offers grants to help fund projects to continue to erect such markers. In order to apply for one of these grants, a rigorous application process must be followed, including providing multiple primary sources verifying that the site is in fact a historical site, a clear inscription detailing why the site is historical, and the site must be more than one hundred years old. Additionally, the foundation recommends that markers are placed in an accessible location, avoiding locations that would require a viewer to trespass on private property, but also away from locations that could potentially harm the marker, such as roads.

== See also ==
- List of New York State Historic Markers
