= List of New York State Historic Markers in Chemung County, New York =

This is a complete list of New York State Historic Markers in Chemung County, New York.

== Listings county-wide ==
	Marker name	Image	Date designated	Location	City or Town	Marker text
1	Line Occupied			On NYS 17 At Lowman.	Ashland, New York	Line Occupied Rifle Corps Under General Hand At Opening Of Battle August 29, 1779.
2	Line Of Rude Breastworks			At Intrsectn. NYS 17 & 367.	Ashland, New York	Where British And Indians Disputed Advance Of Sullivan's Army August 29, 1779.
3	Newtown			On NYS 17 1 Mi. W. Of Lowman	Ashland, New York	So Named By General Sullivan Occupied By British And Indians Destroyed By General Sullivan, August 30, 1779.
4	The Ridge			On NYS 367 South Of Lowman	Ashland, New York	Fortified By The British Formed The South Line Of Defence August 29, 1779.
5	First Settler			On 17 E 1½ Mi. W. Elmira	Big Flats, New York	Christian Myneer Built First Log Cabin 1787 And First Frame House And Planted First Orchard In Town Of Big Flats.
6	Runonvea			On NYS 17 At Big Flats.	Big Flats, New York	Runonvea Indian Village Destroyed By Gen. Sullivan August 13, 1779 .
7	Camp Of Gen. Clinton's Brigade			On NYS 17 2 Mis. W. Of Chemung.	Chemung, New York	Camp Of Gen. Clinton's Brigade Sullivan-Clinton Campaign August 28, 1779.
8	Camp Of Gen. Maxwell's Brigade			On NYS 17 2 Mis. W. Of Chemung.	Chemung, New York	Camp Of Gen. Maxwell's Brigade Sullivan-Clinton Campaign August 28, 1779.
9	Chemung River			On NYS 17 3 Mis. W. Of Chemung.	Chemung, New York	Derived Its Name From Big Horn On Tusk Of Mammoth Found In River Before 1757.
10	Military Route			On NYS 17 At Chemung.	Chemung, New York	Military Route Of The Sullivan-Clinton Army On Its Campaign Against The British And Indians Of Western New York In 1779.
11	Military Route			On NYS 17 Nr. Chemung-Tioga Co. Line .	Chemung, New York	Military Route Of The Sullivan-Clinton Army On Its Campaign Against The British And Indians Of Western New York In 1779.
12	Old Chemung Indian Village			On NYS 17 At Chemung.	Chemung, New York	Old Chemung Indian Village Destroyed By Gen. Sullivan August 13, 1779.
13	Sullivan-Clinton Campaign			On NYS 17½ Mi. W. Of Chemung.	Chemung, New York	Sullivan-Clinton Campaign Army Camp On River Flats To South August 27, 1779.
14	Sullivan Road			On NYS 17½ Mi. W. Of Chemung.	Chemung, New York	Over Narrows Mountain Built For Use Of Sullivan's Army Expedition Against Indians 1779.
15	Dewittsburgh			On E. Water St. In Elmira.	Elmira, New York	Newtown Point Boundary About 1790 Village Named After Moses Dewitt.
16	Encampment			On E. Water St. In Elmira.	Elmira, New York	Encampment Sullivan's Army On Return From Expedition Against The Indians Sept. 24–29, 1779.
17	Mark Twain Study			At Edge Of Park Pl. In Elmira.	Elmira, New York	Built On East Hill 1874 Given To Elmira College In 1952. He Wrote "Tom Sawyer", Other Novels In The Study When Summering In Elmira.
18	Old Ferry			In Brand Park In Elmira.	Elmira, New York	Operated From About 1800 To 1824 Preceded First Bridge.
19	Old Second Street Cemetery			N.W. Cnr., College Ave. & W 2Nd St. In Elmira.	Elmira, New York	1838–1919, Here Are Buried Pioneers, And Soldiers Of The Revolutionary War, War Of 1812 And The Union Army.
20	Military Route			On NYS 13 & NYS 17 In Elmira Heights.	Elmira, New York	Of The Sullivan-Clinton Army On Is Campaign Against The British And Indians Of Western New York In 1779.
21	Military Route			On NYS 17 At Entrance To Newtown Battlefield State Park.	Elmira, New York	Of The Sullivan-Clinton Army On Is Campaign Against The British And Indians Of Western New York In 1779.
22	Military Route			On NYS 14 1 Mi. N. Of Horseheads.	Horseheads, New York	Of The Sullivan-Clinton Army On Is Campaign Against The British And Indians Of Western New York In 1779.
23	Fitzsimmons Cemetery			On NYS 427 So. Of Elmira.	Southport, New York	Fitzsimmons Cemetery Contains Remains Of Many Pioneers And Members Of Sullivan-Clinton Campaign.
24	Green Bently, 1741–1821			On NYS 14 At Millport.	Veteran, New York	Served In Sullivan-Clinton Campaign And Was A Pioneer In Millport. Dedicated By Boy Scouts Of Millport.
25	Military Route			On NYS 14 At Millport.	Veteran, New York	Of The Sullivan-Clinton Army On Its Campaign Against The British And Indians Of Western New York In 1779.

== See also ==
- List of New York State Historic Markers
- National Register of Historic Places listings in New York
- List of National Historic Landmarks in New York
