= List of New York State Historic Markers in St. Lawrence County, New York =

This is an incomplete list of New York State Historic Markers in St. Lawrence County, New York.

== Listings county-wide ==
| | Marker name | Image | Date designated | Location | City or Town | Coords | Marker text |
|---|---|---|---|---|---|---|---|
| 1 | Home of Silas Wright | Historic marker located in Canton, New York, outside the home of former New York Governor Silas Wright, installed by the NYS Department of Education in 1957. | 1957 | On Main St, between Court St and Church St, outside of the St. Lawrence County Center for History and Culture (formerly the home of Silas Wright) | Canton, New York | 44°35′44.9″N 75°10′5.7″W | Statesman; U.S. Senator 1833-43; Gov. Of New York 1844-46. State Education Department 1957 |
| 2 | St. Lawrence University | Historic Marker located in Canton, New York, for St. Lawrence University installed by the NYS Department of Education in 1957 | 1952 | On Park St, South of University Ave, at the edge of the campus. | Canton, New York | 44°35′30.2″N 75°9′56.4″W | Chartered April 3, 1856 by the State Legislature; Richardson Hall cornerstone laid June 18, 1856; State Education Department 1952 |
| 3 | SITE OF BIRTHPLACE | | | On Town Rd. About 5½ Mis. S.w. Of Heuvelton | De Peyster, Town Of, New York | | Maj. Gen. Newton Martin Curtis 1835–1910 Soldier And Legislator, Who Rendered Distinguished Service During The Civil War |
| 4 | ARROW | | | On Nys 184 About 5 Mis. S.w. Of Heuvelton | De Peyster, Town Of, New York | | 1/4 Mile Site Of Birthplace Maj. Gen. Newton Martin Curtis |
| 5 | SITE OF FIRST | | | On Nys 58, Vlge. Of Fowler | Fowler, Town Of, New York | | Talc Mill In United States Built In 1876 By The Agalite Fibre Company Capacity 8 Tons Daily |
| 6 | BRITISH RAID | | | On Nys 11 B & Nys 72, Hopkinton | Hopkinton, Town Of, New York | | In Reb. 1814, British Troops Raided This Village Seizing 300 Barrels Of Flour Of U.s. Gov. And Stored In Barns Of Col. Hopkins Near Brook |
| 7 | MILITARY ROAD | | | At Intersection Nys 72 & Nys 11B At Hopkinton | Hopkinton, Town Of, New York | | To Sackets Harbor War 1812 First Frame House Opposite Built 1806 By Town Founder Roswell Hopkins, Col. In Rev. War, Sec. Of State, Vermont |
| 8 | ROAD JUNCTURE | | | On Intersection Nys 11B & Nys 195, Nicholville | Lawrence, Town Of, New York | | Port Kent To Hopkinton Turnpike Merged With Oldmilitary Turnpike Near Here |
| 9 | SITE OF | | | At Intersection Main & W. Hatfield Sts. | Massena, Town Of, New York | | United States Hotel Built In 1848 By Benjamin Philips, Hotel Faced East Hartfield Street. |
| 10 | SITE OF | | | At Intersection E. Orvis & Tamarack Sts., Massena | Massena, Town Of, New York | | First Settlement It Massena Began In 1792. Sawmill Erected Then. Site Now Occupied By Stone House Built By Capt. Haskell 1825. |
| 10 | SITE OF | | | At Intersection E. Orivs & Water Sts. | Massena, Town Of, New York | | First School In Massena, Built 1803 Located On Water Street, 191 Feet From This Corner. Gilbert Ree, Instructor |
| 11 | SITE OF | | | At Intersection, Main & W. Hatfield Sts. | Massena, Town Of, New York | | Harrogate House Hotel Built In 1822 By Ruel Taylor For Those Who Came To Drink Massena Spring Water |
| 12 | SITE OF | | | On Water St., Massena | Massena, Town Of, New York | | First Grist Mill In Massena, Built 1808-09 By Stephen Reed And Calvin Hubbard |
| 13 | TOWN OF | | | On Nys 56 At Massena Town Line | Massena, Town Of, New York | | Massena Formed March 3, 1802 Named In Honor Of Andre Massena, 1758–1817 Marshal In French Army |
| 14 | TOWN OF | | | On Nys 37 At W. Edge Of Massena | Massena, Town Of, New York | | Massena Formed March 3, 1802 Named In Honor Of Andre Massena, 1758–1817, Mashal In French Army |
| 15 | TOWN OF | | | On Nys 420 At Massena Town Line | Massena, Town Of, New York | | Massena Formed March 3, 1802 Named In Honor Of Andre Massena, 1758–1817 Marshal In French Army |
| 16 | ARROW | | | On Nys 68 At S. Limits Of City | Ogdensburg, Town Of, New York | | Remington Art Memorial Cor. Washington & State Sts. Open 2-5 And 7-9 P.m. Dedicated July 19, 1923 |
| 17 | ARROW | | | On Nys 37 At E. Limits Of City | Ogdensburg, Town Of, New York | | Remington Art Memorial Cor. Washington & State Sts. Open 2-5 And 7-9 P.m. Dedicated July 19, 1923 |
| 18 | ARROW | | | On Nys 37 At W/edge Of City | Ogdensburg, Town Of, New York | | Remington Art Memorial Cor. Washington & State Sts. Open 2-5 And 7-9 P.m. Dedicated July 19, 1923 |
| 19 | ARROW | | | On Nys 87 At S. Limits Of City | Ogdensburg, Town Of, New York | | Remington Art Memorial Cor. Washington & State Sts. Open 2-5 And 7-9 P.m. Dedicated July 19, 1923 |
| 20 | FIRST CHURCH | | | On Nys 72 About 2 Mis. W. Of Parishville | Parishville, Town Of, New York | | In Town Of Parishville Was Built Here In 1828 Moved To Parishville Village 1846 |
| 21 | SITE OF | | | On Nys 72 At Parishville | Parishville, Town Of, New York | | First Bridge Made By White Men In Town Of Parishville 1809 |
| 22 | SITE OF LOG CABIN OF | | | On Nys 72 About 4 Mis. W. Of Parishville | Parishville, Town Of, New York | | Luke Brown First Settler In Town Of Parishville Built 1810 |
| 23 | THE OLD | | | On Nys 72 At Parishville | Parishville, Town Of, New York | | Parish Tavern Built 1815 By David Parish Stood Here Burned 1875 |
| 24 | THIS WAS THE | | | On Nys 72 Near Parishville-potsdam Town Line | Parishville, Town Of, New York | | First Road In The Town Of Parishville Cut Through 1809 Called Luke Brown Road For Earliest Settler |
| 25 | TOWN OF POTSDAM | | | On E. Side Of Nys 11 At S. Edge Of Village | Potsdam, Town Of, New York | | One Of Ten Towns Of 1787. Bought By Clarkson Family With Others, 1802. Settled By Benj. Raymond, Land Agent, 1803. Town Established 1806. |
| 26 | ST PAUL'S | | | On Nys 345 At Waddington | Waddington, Town Of, New York | | Episcopal Church Built On Model Of St Paul's New York, 1818. First Rector, Rev. Amos G. Baldwin Dedicated By Bishop Hobart |

== See also ==
- List of New York State Historic Markers
- National Register of Historic Places listings in New York
- List of National Historic Landmarks in New York
