= List of New York State Historic Markers in Putnam County, New York =

This is an incomplete list of New York State Historic Markers in Putnam County, New York.

== Listings county-wide ==
	Marker name	Image	Date designated	Location	City or Town	Coords	Marker text
1	MAJOR JOHN ANDRE			On NYS 6N near Archer Road	Carmel, Town Of, New York		Court Martial Convoy Passed Here After the Benedict Arnold Treason. They Met George Washington at West Point and Andre was Hanged at Tappan, NY on October 2, 1780.
1	MAJOR JOHN ANDRE			On Croton Falls Road	Carmel, Town Of, New York		Court Martial Convoy Passed Here After the Benedict Arnold Treason. They Met George Washington at West Point and Andre was Hanged at Tappan, NY on October 2, 1780.
1	ENOCH CROSBY			On NYS 52 at Carmel	Carmel, Town Of, New York		Patriot Spy Of The American Revolution. Was Associated With Carmel. His Farm Was Nearby And He Is Buried at Gilead, One Mile From Here
2	RED MILLS			On NYS 6N at Mahopac Falls	Carmel, Town Of, New York		Site Of Grist And Carding Mill, Original Built About 1760 By Col Roger Morris. It Ground Grain For The Revolutionary Soldiers
3	SIBYL LUDINGTON			On NYS 6N at Mahopac Falls	Carmel, Town Of, New York		Rode Horseback Over This Road The Night Of April 26, 1777, To Call Out Colonel Ludington's Regiment To Repel British at Danbury, Conn.
4	FOREST HOUSE			On West Lake Boulevard at Mahopac	Carmel, Town Of, New York	41.3833975°N 73.7456174°W	A Wood Frame Hotel Built In 1883 On The Minnomah Spring Isthmus of Mahopac And Kirk Lakes, Burned In 1940. With Interlaken Trails And Gazebos, Benjamin Silver Rebuilt With Brick, Razed In 1988.
5	SIBYL LUDINGTON			On US 6 at Carmel	Carmel, Town Of, New York		Rode Horseback Over This Road The Night Of April 26, 1777, To Call Out Colonel Ludington's Regiment To Repel British at Danbury, Conn.
6	THE LOG MANSION			On NYS 6N at Mahopac Falls	Carmel, Town Of, New York		Built About 1760 For Mary Philipse And Her Husband, Roger Morris, By Their Grateful Tenants, Stood On The Knoll To The West
7	LUDINGTON'S MARCH			On Co. Rd. at Ludingtonville	Kent, Town Of, New York		March Col. H. Ludington Led His Men Over This Road, April 27, 1777 To Join In Repelling British Raiders at Danbury, Conn.
8	SIBYL LUDINGTON			On NYS 52 South Of Dutchess-Putnam County Line	Kent, Town Of, New York		Here Ended Her Night Ride April 26, 1777, To Summon Militia Of Col. Ludington's Regiment To Repel British Raid at Danbury, Conn.
9	SIBYL LUDINGTON			On NYS 301 at Kent Cliffs	Kent, Town Of, New York		Rode Horseback Over This Road The Night Of April 26, 1777, To Call Out Colonel Ludington's Regiment Of Repel British at Danbury, Conn.
10	SIBYL LUDINGTON			On NYS 301 at Mead Corners	Kent, Town Of, New York		Rode Horseback Over This Road The Night Of April 26, 1777, To Call Out Colonel Ludington's Regiment To Repel British at Danbury, Conn.
11	SIBYL LUDINGTON			On NYS 52 South Of Putnam-Dutchess County Line	Kent, Town Of, New York		Rode Horseback Over This Road The Night Of April 26, 1777, To Call Out Colonel Ludington's Regiment Of Repel British at Danbury, Conn.
12	SITE OF HOUSE			On NYS 301 at Coles Mills	Kent, Town Of, New York		Of Solomon Hopkins, Enoch Crossy's Brother-in-law, The Top Story Window Was Always Open For Patriot Spy To Enter Unobserved
13	COLE'S CORNERS			On NYS 22 About 1 Mi. North Of Haines Corners	Patterson, Town Of, New York		Here Col. Henry Ludington Turned East With His Men April 27, 1777, Marching Toward Danbury, Connecticut To Repel British Raiders
14	LUDINGTON GRAVES			On NYS 311 at Patterson	Patterson, Town Of, New York		Here Are Buried Colonel Henry Ludington, Of The Dutchess County Militia And His Daughter Sibyl, Who Rode To Call Them
15	PUTNAM COUNTY			On NYS 22 at Dutchess-Putnam Border	Patterson, Town Of, New York		Named For General Israel Putnam, Commander Of American Forces In The Hudson Highlands During The American Revolution
16	SETTLER'S REVOLT (Removed by Town Historian because location and information on sign were incorrect)			On NYS 292 at West Patterson	Patterson, Town Of, New York		at Log Church Here, In 1776 Militia Fought Squatters On Philipse Patent, Routed Them And Imprisoned Pendergast, The Leader And 50 Others.
17	ARNOLD'S FLIGHT			On NYS 9D About 3/4 Mi. So.. Of Garrison Four Corners	Philipstown, Town Of, New York		at Beverly Dock, at The Foot Of This Lane, Arnold Disclosed As A Traitor, Fled By Boat To The British Ship Vulture, Off Croton Point.
18	CONNECTICUT CAMPS			On NYS 9D at Garrison Four Corners	Philipstown, Town Of, New York		On The Hill West Of The Brook Are Remains Of Hut Sites, Oven, Etc., Made By New England Troops Guarding West Point, 1778–1783
19	CONNECTICUT LINE			On NYS 301 at E. End Of Nelsonville	Philipstown, Town Of, New York		Troops Were Encamped In This Valley On Both Sides Of The Brook, During The Winter Of 1780–1781 Connecticut To New Jersey.
20	FORT HILL			On Us 9 About 3½ Mis. N. Of Westchester-Putnam Co. Line	Philipstown, Town Of, New York		On The Hill To The West Are The North And South Redoubts, Built In 1778, For The Defense Of The Highlands Against British
21	PUTNAM COUNTY			On Us 9 at Dutchess-Putnam County Line	Philipstown, Town Of, New York		Named For General Israel Putnam, Commander Of American Forces In The Hudson Highlands During The American Revolution
22	PUTNAM COUNTY			On Us 9 at Putnam-Westchester County Line	Philipstown, Town Of, New York		Named For General Israel Putnam, Commander Of American Forces In The Hudson Highlands During The American Revolution
23	ROBINSON HOUSE			On NYS 9D About 3/4 Mi. So.. Of Garrison Four Corners	Philipstown, Town Of, New York		Here Stood The Robinson House, Where Benedict Arnold, His Treason Disclosed, Fled From His Wife And Baby To The British Ship Vulture.
24	SOUTH REDOUBT			On NYS 403 at So. Redoubt Rd.	Philipstown, Town Of, New York		One Of The Fortifications Built In 1776–1777 To Defend The Highlands, Stood On The Hill To The North, Above Here.
25	SUGAR LOAF			On 9D About 1 Mi. South Of Garrison Four Corners	Philipstown, Town Of, New York		On The North Slope Of This Hill Was One Of The Forts Built, 1776–1777 To Defend The Highlands, From Connecticut To New Jersey.
26	THE FIRST CHAIN			On NYS 9D About 1 Mi. N.e. Of Putnam-Westchester Co. Line	Philipstown, Town Of, New York		Planned To Keep British Ships From Going Up River, Anchored On Shore Below, Was Forced By The Enemy Oct. 7, 1777
27	[ARROW] 1/2 MILE			On NYS 9D About 1½ Mis. S. Of Cold Spring	Philipstown, Town Of, New York		Army Camp While West Point Defences Were Being Built 1781 The Connecticut Line Encamped Along The Brook
28	CHANCELLOR KENT			On NYS 22 at Doansburg	Southeast, Town Of, New York		James Kent, Chief Justice Of New York, Author Of "Commentaries on American Law", Was Born On A Site To The West, July 31, 1763
29	ENOCH CROSBY			On Us 6 at Tilly Foster	Southeast, Town Of, New York		Patriot Spy Of American Revolution, Lived On A Farm Given Him For His Service, On The West Side Of This Reservoir
30	FOWLER HOUSE			On Us 6 at Tilly Foster	Southeast, Town Of, New York		On Old Road North, Built About 1740, By Moses Fowler. Washington Often Visited Here On Trips From West Point To Connecticut
31	PUTNAM COUNTY			On NYS 22 at Putnam-Westchester County Line	Southeast, Town Of, New York		Named For General Israel Putnam, Commander Of American Forces In The Hudson Highlands During The American Revolution
32	TILLY FOSTER MINE			On Us 6 at Tilly Foster	Southeast, Town Of, New York		Opened By James Townsend 1810; Large Producer, 1864–1897; Named For Former Owner, Whose Family Came From Harwich, Mass. 1749
33	TWO MILES EAST			On NYS 22 About 1 Mi. N.e. Of Brewster	Southeast, Town Of, New York		Birthplace Of Darius M. Couch Major General, U.s.a. Commander 2D Corps, Army Of Potomac, at Fredericksburg And Chancellorsville, 1862–63
34	LUDINGTON'S MARCH			On Miltown Rd. at State Line Rd.	Southeast, Town Of, New York		March Col. H. Ludington Led His Men Over This Road, April 27, 1777 To Join In Repelling British Raiders at Danbury, Conn.
35	SOUTHEAST CENTRE			On Sodom Rd. at Brewster Hill Rd.	Southeast, Town Of, New York		Early colonial settlement on the Philipse Patent. Center of business prior to the coming of the Harlem Railroad and construction of the reservoirs. Early home of the Howes family, circus performers and impresarios.

== See also ==
- List of New York State Historic Markers
- National Register of Historic Places listings in New York
- List of National Historic Landmarks in New York
