= List of New York State Historic Markers in Niagara County, New York =

This is an incomplete list of New York State Historic Markers in Niagara County, New York.

== Listings county-wide ==
| | Marker name | Image | Date designated | Location | City or Town | Coords | Marker text |
|---|---|---|---|---|---|---|---|
| 1 | FIVE MILE MEADOWS | | | On Nys 18 About 1½ Mis. N., Of Vlge. Of Lewiston | Lewistown, Town Of, New York | | In 1813 The British Forces Landed On The River Band Below And Marched To Burn Manchester, A Village On The Site Of Niagara Falls |
| 2 | FIVE MILE MEADOWS | | | On Nys 18 About 2 Mis. North Of Village Of Lewiston | Lewistown, Town Of, New York | | On Dec. 19, 1813 British Troops Commanded By Colonel Murray Landed On Shore Of River And Marching North Captured Fort Niagara Which They Held Until May 22, 1815 |
| 3 | FORT JONCAIRE | | | At Approach To Toll Bridge Over Niagara R., Vlge. Lewiston | Lewistown, Town Of, New York | | 2nd Building In Lewiston Built 1719 Near This Spot A Palisaded Trading Post First French Fort On Niagara River |
| 4 | OLD TRAMWAY | | | At End Of Toll Bridge Across Niagara R., Vilge. Of Lewiston | Lewistown, Town Of, New York | | Was Built Here By British In 1763 From Landing To Heights Above Facilitating Portage |
| 5 | FIRST METHODIST | | | At Intersection Of Church & Niagara Sts. | Lockport, City Of, New York | | Episcopal Society Organized Oct. 1823, Church Erected 1833, Destroyed By Fire Nov. 1854, Rebuilt 1859, Razed 1936 Emanuel Church Built 1928. |
| 6 | RESIDENCE OF | | | On Market St. Just North Of Adam St. | Lockport, City Of, New York | | Washington Hunt First Judge Of Niagara County, 1836; State Comptroller; Congressman; Governor. Pres. Van Buren Was Guest Here. |
| 7 | THE BIG BRIDGE | | | On Main St. At Barge Canal Bridge | Lockport, City Of, New York | | One Of The Widest In The World, Built, 1914, By New York State, Spanning Erie Barge Canal. Width 399 Ft. 7 In. Roadway Of Creosote Wood Block. |
| 8 | UNION SCHOOL | | | On Chestnut St. Between Washburn & Charles Sts. | Lockport, City Of, New York | | First Union School In State, Created By Act Of March 31, 1847, Erected 1847-48,. Opened July 4, 1848. Founded By Hon. Sullivan Caverno. |
| 9 | WASHINGTON HUNT | | | On Market St. S. Of Adam St. | Lockport, City Of, New York | | Law Office, 1834–1860 Burned And Rebuilt, 1835. |
| 10 | COLD SPRINGS | | | On Town Rd. Near Eastern Limits Of City Of Lockport | Lockport, Town Of, New York | | Cemetery Water Poisoned By Indians In 1812 Caused Death Of British And French Soldiers, First People Buried Here |
| 11 | WYNDAM LAWNEADOWS | | | On Old Niagara Rd. Near Junction With Nys 78 | Lockport, Town Of, New York | | Home For Children. Was Previously Summer Home Of Governor Hunt |
| 12 | FRENCH LANDING | | | On Baffalo Ave. At 10Th St. | Niagara Falls, City Of, New York | | 200 Years Ago In This Park Was The Terminus Of The Old French Portage, Where Goods Were Transhipped When Only Canoes Were Used |
| 13 | FRENCH PORTAGE | | | On Pine St. Between Portage Rd. And 11Th St. | Niagara Falls, City Of, New York | | Nearby Ran The Old French Highway For Fur Trade, Worn By Thousands Of Feet In Moccasins Before The Pilgrims Landed On Plymouth Rock |
| 14 | NAVY ISLAND | | | On Buffalo Ave. Between 53Rd And 54Th Sts. | Niagara Falls, City Of, New York | | Across The River Lies Navy Island; On It Was A French Shipyard. After Capture By British, Vessela For Use On Lake Erie Ere Built There. |
| 15 | OLD BLOCKHOUSE | | | On Portage Rd. Between Ferry And Byrd Aves. | Niagara Falls, City Of, New York | | Here Stood One Of A Line Of Blockhouses Built 1764 By Montresor To Protect The Army Of Bradstreet From Indian Massacres On March |
| 16 | PORTAGE ROAD | | | At Intersection Of Buffalo Ave. And Portage Rd. | Niagara Falls, City Of, New York | | An Indian Trail Used Before White Men Settled In America. Highway For French Fur Trade. Later Improved By British As Military Road |
| 17 | SITE OF | | | On Buffalo Ave. Between 1St &3Rd Sts. | Niagara Falls, City Of, New York | | First House Built By Judge Porter In 1808. Many Notable Visitors And Friendly Indians Were Received Within Its Walls. |
| 18 | SITE OF | | | At Intersection Of Buffalo Ave. And Portage Rd. | Niagara Falls, City Of, New York | | "Fort Du Portage" "Fort Little Niagara" Built 1751 To Protect French Trade. Burned, 1759 During French And Indian War, Except |
| 19 | BRITISH FORCES | | | At Bridge Over 4 Mile Creek About 4 Mis. E. Of Youngstown | Porter, Town Of, New York | | Under Brig. Gen. John Prideaux And Sir William Johnson Landed At Mouth Of Four Mile Creek, July 6, 1759. Besieged Fort Niagara |
| 20 | FOX POINT BATTERY | | | On Main St., In Youngstown | Porter, Town Of, New York | | On Bank Of River To West Is Site Of Fox Point Battery Fifth In Series Of Batteries Extending South From Fort Niagara During War Of 1812 |
| 21 | SITE OF | | | On Main St., Youngstown | Porter, Town Of, New York | | Salt Battery This Battery Was An Important Factor In The Protection Of The Niagara Frontier During War Of 1812 |
| 22 | ARROW | | | On Main St., Youngstown | Porter, Town Of, New York | | Site Of Battle La Belle Familie July 24, 1759, Deciding British Capture Of French Fort Niagara |
| 23 | SITE OF | | | On Orangeport Rd. About 1/2 Mi. S. Intrsctn. Slayton Settlement Rd. | Royalton, Town Of, New York | | First Christian Society Of Royalton 1St Pastor, Rev. Oliver Castle. Erected 1818; Burned 1845; Rebuilt Same Year; Removed 1885 |
| 24 | ARROW | | | At Intrsctn. Orangeport Rd. And Slayton Settlement Rd. | Royalton, Town Of, New York | | Site Of First Christian Society Of Royalton First Church On Holland Land Purchase Between Genesee And Niagara River. Built 1818 |

== See also ==
- List of New York State Historic Markers
- National Register of Historic Places listings in New York
- List of National Historic Landmarks in New York
