= List of New York State Historic Markers in Oswego County, New York =

This is an incomplete list of New York State Historic Markers in Oswego County, New York.

== Listings county-wide ==
	Marker name	Image	Date designated	Location	City or Town	Coords	Marker text
1	FIRST SETTLER			On Nys 49 At Cleveland	Constantia, Town Of, New York		Near This Spot Christopher Martin Made First Settlement In Cleveland 1821
2	FIRST SETTLER			On Nys 49 At Bernhard's Bay	Constantia, Town Of, New York		Near This Spot John Bernhard Made First Settlement In Bernhard's Bay 1795
3	FRENCHMAN'S			On Nys 49 About 1/2 Mile East Of Constantia	Constantia, Town Of, New York		Island Camp Site Of Van Schaick's Expedition On Return From Attack On Onondaga April 22, 1779
4	KEMPWYK			On Nys 49 About 1 Mile West Of Cleveland	Constantia, Town Of, New York		Home Of Francis Adrian Van Der Kamp 1793
5	TRINITY			On Nys 49 At Constantia	Constantia, Town Of, New York		Episcopal Church Erected 1831, 24 Acres And Building Donated By Frederick W. Scriba.
6	FIRST SETTLER			On County Road At Caughdenoy	Hastings, Town Of, New York		Near This Spot Myron Stevens Made First Settlement In Caughdenoy 1797
7	INDIAN FISHERY			On County Road At Caughdenoy	Hastings, Town Of, New York		T'kah-koon-goon-da-nah-yea Was Located Near This Spot 1753
8	NEAR THIS SPOT			On Us 11 At Brewerton	Hastings, Town Of, New York		Samuel De Champlain On October 8, 1615 Crossed The River And Discovered Oneida Lake
9	OVER THIS WATER ROUTE			On Us 11 At Brewerton	Hastings, Town Of, New York		St. Leger's Army Passed Invest Ft. Stanwix July 29, 1777
10	ARROW			On Us 11 At Brewerton	Hastings, Town Of, New York		A Few Rods South Oliver Stevens 1St Settler In Brewerton Erected A Blockhouse 1794
11	SILAS TOWNE			On Co. Rd. At Shore Of Lake Ontario About 4 Miles North Of Mexico	Mexico, Town Of, New York		Revolutionary Hero Here Overheard Plans Of St. Leger's Army Whereby Patriots Saved Ft. Stanwix & Won Battle Of Oriskany
12	ARROW			On County Road About 3 Miles North Of Mexico	Mexico, Town Of, New York		Spy Island And The Grave Of Silas Towne
13	FIRST			At Intersection Of E. Oneida & E. Second Sts.	Oswego, City Of, New York		Court House Erected 1822 On Present Site Removed 1859 And Since Used For Church Purposes
14	HERE WAS THE OLD			At Intersection Of W. Seneca & W. First Sts.	Oswego, City Of, New York		Cable Ferry By Which The River Was Crossed 1803
15	THIS WAS THE			At Intersection Of W. Seneca & W. First Sts.	Oswego, City Of, New York		First Building In Oswego To Be Used As A School House, Church And Public Hall Erected About 1806
16	CAPTAIN			On County Road At Redfield	Redfield, Town Of, New York		Nathan Sage Of Conn. Made The First Settlement In Town Of Redfield Nearby About 1795
17	SAMUEL DE			On Us 11 At Pulaski	Richfield, Town Of, New York		Champlain West Of Here On Lake Shore Champlain With French And Hurons Landed, Oct. 1615 On His Expedition Against Iroquois
18	1809 STATE ROAD			On Nys 49 At Roosevelt Corners	Schroeppel, Town Of, New York		Later Plank Road. Passed Through Roosevelt Hamlet, Founded By Nicholas J. Roosevelt
19	BURIAL PLACE			On County Road In Pennellville	Schroeppel, Town Of, New York		Founder Of Town Of Schroeppel, Owner Of Twenty Thousand Acres, Died 1825.
20	GRIST MILL			On Town Road At Gilbert's Mills	Schroeppel, Town Of, New York		First In Town Of Schroeppel Built Here At Gilbert's Mills By Andrus And Hiram Gilbert In 1819
21	HINMANVILLE			On County Rd. At Hinmanville	Schroeppel, Town Of, New York		Lock No. 1 Located Near Here. Lock Tender's House Nearby. Old Oswego Canal Completed 1828. Important Waterway To West.
22	KUH-NA-TA-HA			On Nys 57 At Phoenix	Schroeppel, Town Of, New York		Indian Fishing Village 1654 Known To The Indians As "Place Of Tall Pines" Discovered By Father Le Moyne
23	PENNELL			On County Road In Pennellville	Schroeppel, Town Of, New York		Saw Mill Built Here By Dr. Richard Pennell In 1833
24	SCHROEPPEL			On Town Rd. At Schroeppel's Bridge	Schroeppel, Town Of, New York		Homestead First Frame House Built In Schroeppel Town 1818 By George Casper Schroeppel
25	SITE OF			On Nys 57 At Three Rivers	Schroeppel, Town Of, New York		British Camp Sir Jeffery Amherst With Ten Thousand Troops Was Here 1760 Enroute To Canada To Crush French Power In America
26	SITE OF			On Nys 57 At Three Rivers	Schroeppel, Town Of, New York		Stockaded Fort 1758-1759 About 60 Feet Square Containing 3 Storehouses Built By Colony Of N. Y.
27	SITE OF			On Nys 264 About 1 Mile North Of Phoenix	Schroeppel, Town Of, New York		Toll Gate Plank Road Built 1855 Connected Phoenix With Pennellville. Road Five Miles In Length.
28	SITE OF			On Nys 57 At Phoenix	Schroeppel, Town Of, New York		Toll Gate Schroeppel Was Held Here At Home Of James B. Richardson In 1833
29	SITE OF			On Town Road At Gilbert's Mills	Schroeppel, Town Of, New York		Salt Well Well Sunk 340 Feet In 1864 By Capt. E.s. Cook Resulted In Strong Salt Brine. Six Kettles Were Built Into An Arch For Manufacturing Salt
30	SITE OF			At Intersection Of State & Culvert Sts. At Phoenix	Schroeppel, Town Of, New York		First Log Cabin Abram Paddock Known To Indian As "Bear Hunter Paddock", First White Settler In Schroeppel, Built His Cabin Here 1801
31	TOWN MEETING			On Nys 57 At Phoenix	Schroeppel, Town Of, New York		First Town Meeting In Schroeppel Was Held Here At Home Of James B. Richardson In 1833
32	TREASURE ISLAND			On Nys 57 At Phoenix	Schroeppel, Town Of, New York		French Colonists Camped On Island In Escaping From Onondaga Indians In 1658. Said To Have Lightened Their War Chests And Deposited Cannon And Gold Here
33	SITE OF THE FIRST			On Us 104 At Scriba	Scriba, Town Of, New York		Log House In Scriba. Built 1804 By Major Hiel Stone Temporary Hospital For Wounded Soldiers 1814
34	JEROME I. CASE			On Nys 13 At Williamstown	Williamstown, Town Of, New York		1819-1891 Born Near Here Pioneer Builder Of Power Farm Machinery

== See also ==
- List of New York State Historic Markers
- National Register of Historic Places listings in New York
- List of National Historic Landmarks in New York
