= List of New York State Historic Markers in Wayne County, New York =

This is an incomplete list of New York State Historic Markers in Wayne County, New York.

== Listings county-wide ==
=== Pultneyville, Hamlet of ===
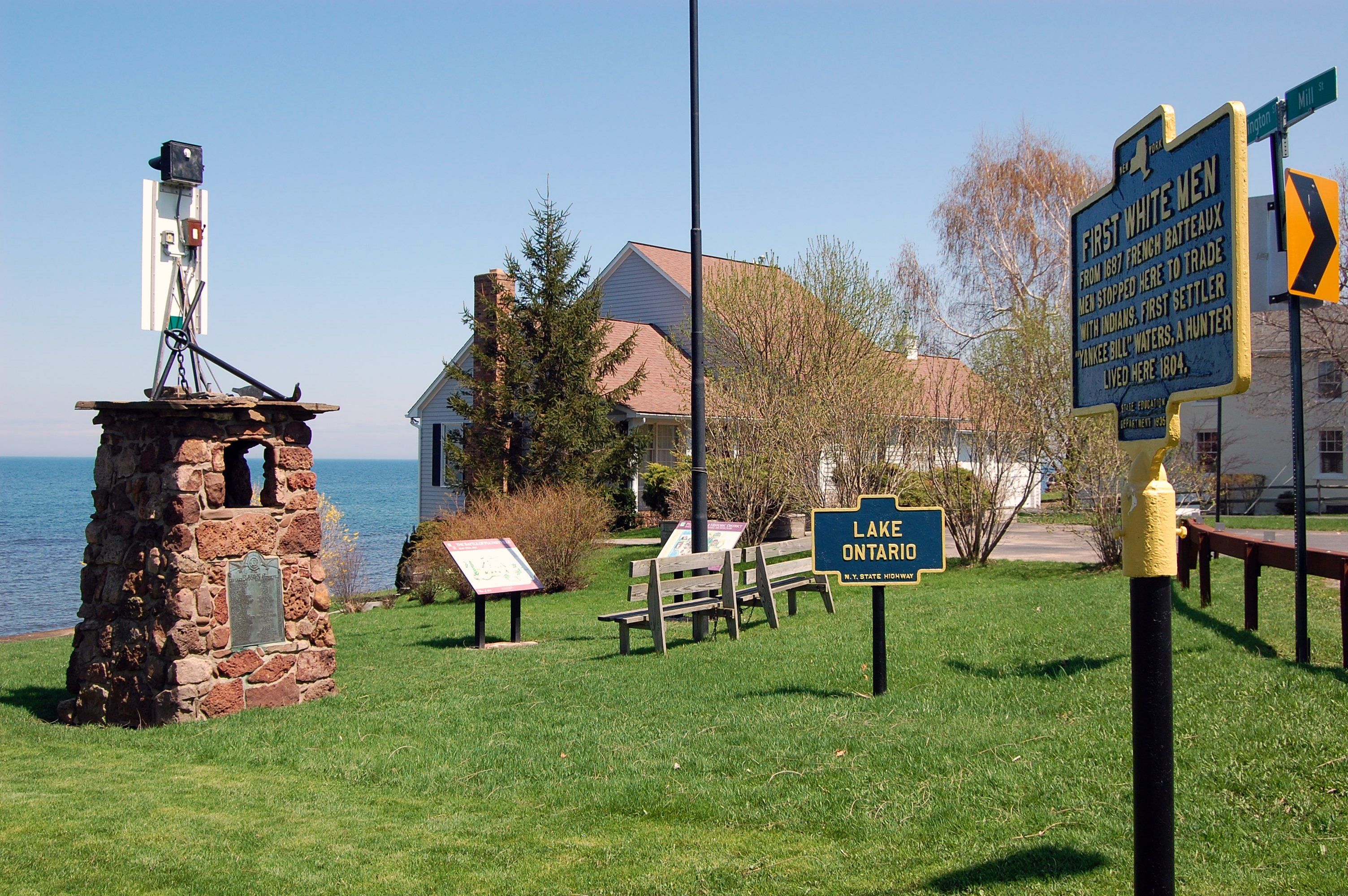
Pultneyville's Lake Captains' Monument and "Yankee Bill" Waters marker

- FIRST WHITE MEN
  - Location: Intersection of Washington and Mill streets.
  - Inscription: First White Men. From 1687 French batteaux men stopped here to trade with Indians. First settler "Yankee Bill" Waters, a hunter, lived here 1804.
  - Erected by: State Education Department, 1935
  - GPS Coord: 43°16′47″N 77°11′11″W (43.279, -76.186)

== See also ==
- List of New York State Historic Markers
- National Register of Historic Places listings in New York
- List of National Historic Landmarks in New York
