= List of New York State Historic Markers in Yates County, New York =

This is a complete list of New York State Historic Markers in Yates County, New York.

== Listings county-wide ==
	Marker name	Image	Date designated	Location	City or Town	Marker text
1	Methodist Church			On Nys 14A At Benton Crnrs.	Benton, New York	Methodist Church Benton Class Formed 1793 Ezra Cole Preached 1792 Oldest Existing Religious Society In Yates Co. And Of Methodism In Western N.Y.
2	Red Jacket			On Nys 54A About 1/2 Mile South Of Branchport	Branchport, New York	Near This Spot Stood Cabin Home Occupied By Parents Of Noted Seneca Chief Red Jacket, 1752. His Mother's Grave Is Near
3	Friend's Home			On Co. Rd. About 4 Miles North Of Branchport	Jerusalem, New York	Built About 1790 Friend's Home Here Lived Jemima Wilkinson Known As The Universal Friend
4	Gu-Ya-No-Ga			On Co. Rd. About 2 Miles North Of Branchport	Jerusalem, New York	Here Lived Gu-Ya-No-Ga Indian Chief Of The Seneca Nation Friend Of The Revolution
5	Indian Burials			In Vine Valley	Middlesex, New York	Here Is An Indian Burial Place Of The Period Prior To The Coming Of Early Senecas. Excavated By State Museum 1922.
6	Potter Mansion			On Co. Rd. About 3½ Miles Northwest Of Penn Yan	Potter, New York	Built About 1790 Potter Mansion Home Of Arnold Potter Pioneer & Early Settler After Whom Town Is Named
7	The Universal Friend			On Town Rd. About 1 Mile South Of Dresden	Torrey, New York	The Universal Friend Jemima Wilkinson Her Settlement 1788–1794

== See also ==
- List of New York State Historic Markers
- National Register of Historic Places listings in New York
- List of National Historic Landmarks in New York
