= List of New York State Historic Markers in Ontario County, New York =

This is an incomplete list of New York State Historic Markers in Ontario County, New York.

== Listings county-wide ==
	Marker name	Image	Date designated	Location	City or Town	Coords	Marker text
1	BURNING SPRINGS			On Case Rd. About 1 Mi. Northwest Of Bristol Center	Bristol, Town Of, New York	42°48′59″N 77°24′21″W	Charted On Earliest Maps Of North America After La Salle's Visit August 1669. Caused By Escaping Natural Gas. Once Mystery To Visitors
2	CANANDAIGUA ACADEMY			On Nys 332 Between Fort Hill Ave. & Granger St.	Canandaigua, Town Of, New York		Incorporated 1795 First Academy On Phelps & Gorham Tract
3	GRANGER HOMESTEAD			On Nys 332 Between Granger & Chapel Sts.	Canandaigua, Town Of, New York		Home Of Gideon Granger Postmaster Gen. In Gacinets Of Jefferson & Madison Resident Here 1814–1822
4	PHELPS-GORHAM PURCHASE			On Us 20, Nys 5 & Nys 21 Between Niagara & Ontario Sts.	Canandaigua, Town Of, New York		Pioneer Land Office In Western N.y. Estab. Here 1St Judge Of Co. 1789-93
5	SITE OF			On Us 20 & Nys 5 At Intersection S. Main & Parish Sts.	Canandaigua, Town Of, New York		Pioneer Home Capt. Jasper Parrish Settled Here In 1792 Indian Captive Six Years Govt. Interterter Later Died In 1826
6	ARROW			On Nys 21 & Nys 332 At Intersection N. Main St. & Gibson St.	Canandaigua, Town Of, New York		8 Miles North, Route 21 Cumorah Famous Mormon Hill And Angel Moroni Monument
7	HERENDEEN HOMESTEAD			On Co. Rd. About 2½ Miles South Of Farmington	Farmington, Town Of, New York		1832. Entrance Porch Added By Josephine Herendeen 1932
8	GANECHSTAGE			On White Spring Rd. At The West Limits Of City.	Geneva, City Of, New York		Site Of Seneca Village And Jesuit Mission For The Indians Established 1687
9	PREEMPTION LINE			On Us 20 & Nys 5 At Western Edge Of The City	Geneva, City Of, New York		Boundary Drawn Between Massachusetts And New York December 16, 1786 Cause Of Long Controversy In Western New York
10	SITE OF			On Washington St. Between Pulteney & Main Sts.	Geneva, City Of, New York	42°51′52″N 76°59′6″W	Geneva Hotel Erected 1796 By Capt. Charles Williamson
11	SITE OF GENEVA			On Us 20, Nys 5 & Nys 14 Between Washington & Hamilton Sts.	Geneva, City Of, New York		Medical College Eliz. Blackwell Received Here In 1849 The First Degree Of Md Ever Conferred Upon A Woman
12	SITE OF LOG HOUSE			On S. Exchange St. South Of Washington St.	Geneva, City Of, New York	42°51′54.65″N 76°58′58.48″W	Erected 1787 Later Known As Elark Jenings Tavern
13	SMITH OBSERVATORY			On Castle St. Between Hillcrest & Highland Aves.	Geneva, City Of, New York		World Famous For The Discoveries Of Director Dr. William R. Brooks
14	TORY QUARTERS			On Us 20 & Nys 5 Along Seneca Lake	Geneva, City Of, New York		Site Of Military Depot Under Command Of Col. John Butler Destroyed Sept. 1779 In Sullivan Expedition
15	GLASS FACTORY			On Rte. 14 About 1½ Miles S. Of Geneva	Geneva, Town Of, New York		Bay 1810–1850 Ontario Glass Manufactory Blowers Of Window Glass Village Of 500 Inhabitants
16	SITE OF KANADESAGA			On Co. Rd. To Seneca Castle About 1/4 Mile West Of Geneva	Geneva, Town Of, New York		Chief Castle Of The Seneca Nation Destroyed Sept. 7, 1779 In Gen. John Sullivan's Raid
17	MARCUS WHITMAN			On Nys 245 At Rushville	Gorham, Town Of, New York		Pioneer Missionary Patriot Colonizer In Oregon Ter. Born Here Sept. 4, 1802
18	HILL CUMORAH			On Nys 21 About 2 Miles N. Of Manchester	Manchester, Town Of, New York		The Mormons Believe That Here In 1827 Joseph Smith Received The Book Of Mormon
19	ARROW			At Intersection Of Nys 21 & Nys 96 At Manchester	Manchester, Town Of, New York		2 Miles North Cumorah Famous Mormon Hill And Angel Moroni Monument
20	FIRST CHURCH			In Village Park In Naples	Naples, Town Of, New York		On This Site Was Organized The "First Religious Compact Of Middletown 1800" The Church Was Built In 1824
21	FOSSIL TREE			On Nys 21 & Nys 245 At Naples	Naples, Town Of, New York		One Mile West Of This Spot Was Discovered The Fossil Devonian Tree Trunk In The Bed Of Grimes Creek. It Is Now In The State Museum
22	NAPLES			On Nys 21 & Nys 245 At Naples	Naples, Town Of, New York		Founded 1789 On The Old Seneca Village Of Nundawao; First Known As Watkinstown; In 1796 Called Middletown; On April 6, 1808, Named Naples
23	NAPLES			On Nys 21 & Nys 245 At Naples	Naples, Town Of, New York		Known As Watkinstown 1789; Named Middletown 1796, Midway Between Canandaigua And Bath; Naples April 6, 1808
24	MILITARY ROUTE			On Us 20A About 1/2 Mile E. Of Honeoye	Richmond, Town Of, New York		Of The Sullivan-clinton Army On Its Campaign Against The British And Indians Of Western New York In 1779
25	NEARBY IS THE SITE OF			On Us 20A About 1/2 Mile E. Of Honeoye	Richmond, Town Of, New York		Pioneer Home Capt. Peter Pitts First Settler In Town Of Richmond
26	OLD REED			On Reed Rd. About 1/2 Mile South Of Richmond Mills	Richmond, Town Of, New York		Homestead First Brick House In Town Of Richmond Built 1803 By Philip Reed
27	PITTS MANSION			On Us 10A At Honeoye	Richmond, Town Of, New York		Built 1821 By Gideon Pitts Son Of Capt. Peter Pitts Pioneer Settler In 1789
28	EZRA WILMARTH			On Co. Rd. About 1 Mile South Of Victor	Victor, Town Of, New York		Opened Stagecoach Inn Here Dec. 25, 1815. Original Inn Sign Had Masonic Emblem. Soldiers Of War Of 1812 Gathered On This Site
29	FISHER HOMESTEAD			On Co. Rd. At Fishers	Victor, Town Of, New York		Oldest House Here, Built By Chas. Fisher, 1811. Fishers Named For Him. Post Office 1850. Home Of Henry Pardee, Assemblyman 1840.
30	PARK PLACE			On Town Rd. About 1¼ Miles East Of Fishers	Victor, Town Of, New York		Built By Simeon Parks April 1813, Who Cleared A Large Tract Of Land. Famous Plank Road Went By Here
31	SENECA TRAIL			On Tn. Rd. About 3 Miles Northwest Of Victor	Victor, Town Of, New York		Traversed By French Army Of Denonville, 1687. Here Were Seneca Lodges Where Friendly Indian Followers Of Trail Were Welcomed

== See also ==
- List of New York State Historic Markers
- National Register of Historic Places listings in New York
- List of National Historic Landmarks in New York
