= List of New York State Historic Markers in Tioga County, New York =

This is an incomplete list of New York State Historic Markers in Tioga County, New York.

== Listings county-wide ==
	Marker name	Image	Date designated	Location	City or Town	Coords	Marker text
1	CARANTOUAN			On Nys 17 At W. End Of Waverly	Barton, New York		Spanish Hill, 650 Ft. South Where Etienne Brule, Scout Of Champlain Came In 1615. The First White Explorer Known To Reach This Region
2	ELLIS CREEK			On Nys 17 About 1 1/2 miles (2.4 km) East Of Waverly	Barton, New York		Named In Honor Of Ebenezer Ellis, Revolutionary Soldier. Pioneer In Forest 1787 This Community-ellistown
3	MAUGHANTOWANO			On Nys 17 About 4 1/2 miles (7.2 km) East Of Waverly	Barton, New York		Where In Spring Of 1779 Encamped Sawyer And Cowley American Soldiers With Four Indian Captors En Route To British Lines
4	SITE OF			On Nys 17 At W. Waverly	Barton, New York		Shepard Tavern Built About 1816 By John Shepard & Enlarged By Isaac Shepard In 1825 Destroyed By Fire 1853
5	THE FIRST			On Intersection Nys 17 & 34 At North End Of Waverly	Barton, New York		Grist Mill On Cayuta Creek, Built Here Soon After 1800 By George Walker. Was Active For A Century
6	JAMES MCMASTER			On Co. Rd., N. End Vlge. Of Candor	Candor, New York		Pioneer, Revolutionary Soldier To Whom Was Granted Title "Mcmaster's Half Township" 1788 Lies Buried Near Here
7	LINE OF			On Nys 223, Vlge. Of Candor	Candor, New York		Ithaca & Owego R.r. Inc. 1828 Second Chartered In State Operated By Horse Power For First Six Years
8	BY TRADITION THIS			On Nys 38, Village Of Newark Valley	Newark Valley, New York		Maple Tree Was Blazed In 1786 Spared When Indian Trail Was Widened Into Wagon Road
9	WADE FARM			On Nys 38 About 2 Mis. S.w. Of Village Of Neward Valley	Newark Valley, New York		Purchased 1833 By Lewis Wade 1791–1862, Musician War Of 1812. Owned And Worked Successively By Lewis Wade; William Wade; Edgar O. Wade; Floyd E. Wade
10	ASBURY CHURCH			On Co. Rd. 5 Mis. West Of Village Of Nichols	Nichols, New York		Erected 1822-23 Society Formed 1818 By Rev. John Griffing With Members Elijah, Phebe, Ann, Mariah And Daniel Mcd. Shoemaker
11	BEFORE 1800 THIS ROAD LED			On Nys 283 At Lounsberry	Nichols, New York		To A Ferry Across The Susquehanna River To Tioga Center, Operated By John Decker And Gideon Cortright, Rev. Soldier
12	COXE'S MANOR			On Nys 283 About 2 1/2 miles (4.0 km) West Of Owego	Nichols, New York		31,470 Acres Of Land Along This Susquehanna Valley Were Granted To Daniel Coxe And Associates By The Crown Of England January 15, 1775
13	LOUNSBERRY			On Nys 283 At Lounsberry	Nichols, New York		Formerly Named Canfield Corners Benjamin Lounsberry Settled Here In 1793. Exra Canfield First Postmaster
14	1828			On Court St., Vlge. Of Owego	Owego, New York		Old Academy Building On The Site Of The First Schoolhouse Of Owego Settlement Built Of Logs About 1797
15	A LOG HOUSE			On W. Front St., Vlge. Of Owego	Owego, New York		First Permanent Building In This Part Of The Valley Built 1785 Near Here By James Mcmaster & Party
16	CAMPVILLE			On Nys 17C About 6 miles (9.7 km) East Od Village Of Owego	Owego, New York		Named In Honor Of Col. Asa Camp Revolutionary Soldier Who Settled Here In 1800 & Conducted 1St Tavern
17	FIRST SAWMILL			On Nys 17 At W. End Vlge. Owego	Owego, New York		In Owego, Built By James Mcmaster & Amos Draper Before 1791, Stood Just Above This Bridge
18	FIRST TAVERN			On Church St., Vlge. Of Owego	Owego, New York		In Owego, Built By Captain Luke Bates In 1795, Stood Here First Town Meeting Held In Tavern
19	HERE THE			On Front St., Vlge. Of Owego	Owego, New York		Indian Trail From Cayuga Lake Joined The Susquehanna Trail Traveled Paths Long Before Coming Of The White Man
20	ISAAC HARRIS			On Old Nys 17 At S. End Of Vlge. Of Apalachin	Owego, New York		Who Settled Here In 1786 Was Delegate To Philadel- Phia In 1790 And Secured Squatters Rights From The Patentees Of Coxe's Manor
21	ITHACA-OWEGO R.R.			On Nys 17, Vlge. Of Owego	Owego, New York		Second Chartered In State Inc. June 28, 1828 Crossed The Village Park To Terminus On Site Of Ahwaga Park
22	JAS. MC MASTER			On Nys 17, Vlge. Of Owego	Owego, New York		Was Granted Title To The West Half Of Township Site Of Present Village Of Owego 1788
23	NICHOLAS			On Nys 96 At Erie R.r. Crossing, Vlge. Of Owego	Owego, New York		Delaware Warrior Successful Farmer Among The Pioneers; Whose Squaw Gave Name To Squaw Island, Claimed This Flat
24	OWAGEO			On Nys 17 At N. End Bridge Over Susquehanna R., Vilge. Of Owego	Owego, New York		An Indian Village Burned August 19, 1779 By Gen. Clinton's Force Enroute To Join General Sullivan
25	OWEGO			On Nys 96 At Erie R.r. Crossing, Vlge. Of Owego	Owego, New York		Birthplace Of Erie Here Was Held Convention December 20, 1831 To Further The Charter Of New York And Erie Railroad
26	OWEGO & ITHACA			On Nys 96 At N. End, Vlge. Of Owego	Owego, New York		Turnpike Incorporated 1807 Giving Northern Settlement Access To Markets Of Pennsylvania & Maryland
27	OWEGO FEMALE SEMINARY			On Nys 17C, vlge. Of Owego	Owego, New York		Opened In 1828 By Juliette M. Camp. Owego Female Institute In 1843 Headed By Prof. And Mrs. Joseph M. Ely
28	TAVERN - 1831			On County Rd. At Apalachin	Owego, New York		Built By Pioneer Merchant Ransom Steele The Barnaby Academy Was Located Here Several Years During The Civil War
29	TOLL BRIDGE			On Nys 17 At S. End Of Bridge Over Susquehanna River	Owego, New York		Of 1828, Swept Away By Flood Of 1867. Trestle Bridge Of 1868, Purchased By Village, 1881. Steel Bridge Erected, 1893.
30	DUNHAMVILLE			On Nys 38 About 1/2 mile (0.80 km) S. Of Village Of Richford	Richford, New York		Experimental City State Proposed In 1828 By Wm. Dunham, Merchant, First Postmaster, And Supervisor Of Richrord.
31	EARLY TURNPIKE			At Intersection Nys 38 & 79 At Vlge. Of Richford	Richford, New York		Commission Of 1797: "To Lay Out The Road Leading From Catskill Landing To Catherinestown In The County Of Tioga."
32	FIRST CHURCH			On Nys 38, Vlge. Of Richford	Richford, New York		Organized 1821, Built 1823 By Purtan Settlers. Rebuilt In 1854. Original Bell Now In Use
33	PUBLIC SQUARE			On Nys 96 At Erie R.r. Crossing, Vlge. Of Owego	Richford, New York		Granted By Deed To The Town Of Richford By The Pioneers Ezek. Rich & Stephen Wells October 9, 1821
34	SITE OF			On Nys 38, Vlge. Of Richford	Richford, New York		The Old Abbey Built 1813 By Samuel Smith Who Kept A Tavern Here. The Richford Post Office Established Here In 1830.
35	SPENCER WAS THE			On Nys 34, Vlge. Of Spencer	Spencer, New York		County Seat 1811–1822 On This Lot Stood The Old Court House Destroyed By Fire 1821

== See also ==
- List of New York State Historic Markers
- National Register of Historic Places listings in New York
- List of National Historic Landmarks in New York
