= Gardenville, New York =

Hamlet in New York, United States

Coordinates: 42°51′31″N 78°45′16″W

Gardenville is a hamlet in the town of West Seneca in Erie County, New York, United States. It is around the Clinton St and Union Rd intersection in south Cheektowaga, New York, north West Seneca.
