= Pierre Billiou =

Pierre Billiou (c.1632 – c.1708) was a French Huguenot born in Flanders. He founded Old Town in 1661, one of the first permanent settlements on Staten Island, shortly before the Dutch colony of New Netherland became the British Province of New York. Billiou began constructing the Dutch Colonial home in the 1660s, now known as the Billiou–Stillwell–Perine House, which is landmarked as the oldest existing building on Staten Island and one of the oldest buildings in the United States. His family still lives under the modern name Bilyeu and lives in Tennessee, Louisiana, Missouri, and Oklahoma.
