= List of county routes in Schoharie County, New York =

County routes in Schoharie County, New York, are signed with the Manual on Uniform Traffic Control Devices-standard yellow-on-blue pentagon route marker.

== Routes 1–50 ==
Route	Length (mi)	Length (km)	From	Via	To	Notes
CR 1	4.84	7.79	NY 7 / NY 10 in Richmondville	Mineral Springs Road	NY 145 in Cobleskill	
CR 1A	4.30	6.92	NY 145 in Middleburgh	Schoharie Hill Road and Bridge Street	NY 30 in Schoharie village	
CR 1B	7.22	11.62	NY 30 in Schoharie village	Prospect Street and Rickard Hill Road	Albany County line in Wright	
CR 2	7.26	11.68	NY 10 in Jefferson	North Road	NY 30 in Blenheim	
CR 2A	3.45	5.55	Delaware County line (becomes CR 29)	North Harpersfield Road in Jefferson	NY 10	
CR 3	6.89	11.09	NY 990V in Conesville	Potter Mountain Road	Greene County line (becomes CR 36)	Western terminus is also southern terminus of CR 18 (and eastern terminus of NY 990V)
CR 4	12.33	19.84	NY 30 in Fulton	West Fulton Road	NY 7 / NY 10 in Richmondville	
CR 5	5.51	8.87	NY 165 in Seward	Slate Hill Road	US 20 in Sharon	
CR 5A	3.24	5.21	US 20 in Sharon	Argusville Road	Montgomery County line in Sharon (becomes CR 102)	
CR 5B	1.49	2.40	CR 5A	Church Street in Carlisle	Montgomery County line	
CR 6	7.76	12.49	Otsego County line (becomes CR 40)	Charlotte Valley Road in Summit	NY 10	
CR 7	3.90	6.28	US 20	Mickle and Crommie roads in Carlisle	US 20	
CR 7A	3.55	5.71	CR 10	Lykers and Corbin Hill roads in Carlisle	Montgomery County line (becomes CR 104)	
CR 8	3.81	6.13	NY 7	Barnerville Road in Cobleskill	CR 9	
CR 8A	1.73	2.78	CR 9 in Cobleskill	Howes Cave Road	NY 7 / CR 52 in Schoharie	
CR 9	4.63	7.45	NY 7 in Cobleskill	Caverns Road	CR 10 in Esperance	
CR 10	9.82	15.80	CR 8 in Cobleskill	Grosvenors Corners Road	NY 30A in Esperance	
CR 11	3.71	5.97	NY 145	Little York Road in Carlisle	US 20	
CR 12	4.48	7.21	NY 10 in Jefferson	Blenheim Hill Road	CR 2 in Blenheim	
CR 13	9.34	15.03	NY 10 in Jefferson	Shew Hollow and Stryker roads	NY 990V in Gilboa	Discontinuous; Stryker Road bridge near Schoharie Creek permanently closed after resulting damage from Hurricane Irene
CR 14	6.33	10.19	NY 23	South Gilboa Road in Gilboa	NY 30	Formerly part of NY 342
CR 15	3.08	4.96	CR 2A	Moxley Street Road in Jefferson	NY 10	
CR 16	5.91	9.51	CR 43 in Jefferson	Wharton Hollow	NY 10 in Summit	
CR 17	12.89	20.74	NY 990V in Gilboa	Flat Creek and Keyser Kill roads	CR 36 in Fulton	
CR 18	7.96	12.81	NY 990V at CR 3 in Conesville	Bear Kill and Hubbard roads	CR 17 / CR 53 in Gilboa	Southern terminus is also western terminus of CR 3 (and eastern terminus of NY 990V)
CR 19	4.32	6.95	CR 17	Stone Store Mountain Road in Broome	NY 145	
CR 19A	3.37	5.42	NY 145	Hauverville Road in Broome	Albany County line (becomes CR 353)	
CR 20	6.86	11.04	NY 10 in Summit	Sawyer Hollow Road	CR 4 in Fulton	
CR 21	5.51	8.87	NY 145 in Middleburgh village	Huntersland Road	Albany County line in Middleburgh (becomes CR 10)	
CR 22	3.72	5.99	Otsego County line in Richmondville (becomes CR 38A)	Brooker Hollow Road	Summit Street in Richmondville village	
CR 23	4.96	7.98	NY 10 in Summit	Beards Hollow Road	NY 7 / NY 10 in Richmondville	
CR 23A	0.87	1.40	NY 7 / NY 10	Warnerville Cut-Off in Richmondville	NY 10	
CR 24	3.10	4.99	NY 443	Knox Road in Wright	Albany County line (becomes CR 255)	
CR 25	4.82	7.76	NY 30 in Schoharie	Barton Hill Road	Schenectady County line in Wright (becomes CR 137)	
CR 26	2.78	4.47	NY 146	Larry Hill Road in Wright	Schenectady County line (becomes CR 135)	
CR 27	2.81	4.52	NY 7 in Schoharie	Junction Road	NY 30A in Esperance	
CR 28	2.61	4.20	CR 44 in Esperance village	Burtonsville Road	Montgomery County line in Esperance (becomes CR 127)	
CR 29	3.41	5.49	NY 10 in Seward	Lawyersville Road	NY 145 in Cobleskill	
CR 30	3.96	6.37	NY 165	Gardnersville Road in Seward	NY 145	
CR 31	5.52	8.88	NY 30 in Blenheim	Bear Ladder Road	CR 4 in Fulton	
CR 32	2.14	3.44	NY 10	Parsons Road in Sharon	US 20	
CR 33	5.24	8.43	NY 7 in Richmondville	West Richmondville Road	NY 165 in Seward	
CR 34	2.62	4.22	US 20	Gilberts Corners Road in Sharon	CR 34A at Sharon Hill Road	
CR 34A	1.68	2.70	CR 34 at Sharon Hill Road	Onderdunk Road in Sharon	CR 5A	
CR 35	2.83	4.55	NY 162	Shun Pike Road in Esperance	US 20	
CR 36	7.41	11.93	NY 30 in Fulton	Clauverwine Road	NY 145 in Middleburgh village	
CR 37	3.87	6.23	CR 11 in Carlisle	Hubb Shutts Road	CR 8 in Cobleskill	
CR 38	3.34	5.38	CR 10 in Carlisle	Saddlemire Hill Road	US 20 in Esperance	
CR 39	1.69	2.72	Greene County line (becomes CR 7)	Prattsville Road in Conesville	NY 990V	
CR 40	4.83	7.77	CR 5 in Seward	Engleville Road	CR 55 in Sharon	
CR 41	4.81	7.74	NY 145 in Middleburgh	Ecker Hollow Road	NY 145 in Cobleskill	
CR 42	3.16	5.09	Delaware County line (becomes CR 30)	Peck Street in Jefferson	NY 10	
CR 43	9.36	15.06	NY 10 in Jefferson	West Kill Road	NY 30 in Blenheim	
CR 44	3.21	5.17	Montgomery County line in Esperance (becomes CR 131)	Conover Road	US 20 in Esperance village	
CR 45	3.54	5.70	Delaware County line	Taylor and Churchill roads in Jefferson	CR 42	
CR 46	1.21	1.95	CR 27	Creek Road in Esperance	Schenectady County line (becomes CR 106)	
CR 48	0.32	0.51	NY 7	Court Street in Richmondville	NY 7	
CR 49	0.78	1.26	NY 10	Button Street in Sharon	Montgomery County line	
CR 50	1.31	2.11	NY 145	Windy Ridge Road in Broome	NY 145	

== Routes 51 and up ==
Route	Length (mi)	Length (km)	From	Via	To	Notes
CR 51	0.62	1.00	NY 30A	Church Street in Schoharie	North Main Street	
CR 52	1.33	2.14	NY 7 / CR 8A	Wetsell Hollow in Schoharie	CR 1A	
CR 53	5.85	9.41	CR 17 in Gilboa	Guinea Road	CR 17 in Fulton	
CR 54	1.20	1.93	CR 25	Sheldon Road in Schoharie	Schenectady County line (becomes CR 151)	
CR 55	2.25	3.62	Otsego County line in Sharon (becomes CR 34A)	Chestnut Street	US 20 in Sharon Springs	
CR 56	1.25	2.01	CR 6	Bear Gulch Road in Summit	End of county maintenance	
CR 57	3.44	5.54	NY 145 in Middleburgh	Sunnyside Road	CR 1A in Schoharie	
CR 59	5.66	9.11	NY 990V in Conesville	Bull Hill Road	CR 18 in Gilboa	
CR 60			CR 1	Shad Point Road in Cobleskill	NY 7 / NY 145	Former number
CR 61	5.72	9.21	CR 17 in Gilboa	Broome Center Road	Albany County line in Broome (becomes CR 362)	
CR 62	1.30	2.09	Tamarack Road	Camp Summit Road in Fulton	CR 20	
CR 63	3.80	6.12	CR 33	Clove Road in Seward	NY 10	
CR 64	4.35	7.00	Otsego County line in Summit	Baptist Church and Meade roads	NY 10 in Jefferson	
CR 65	2.06	3.32	CR 27	Sanitarium Road in Esperance	NY 30 at Schenectady County line (becomes CR 155)	
CR 66	7.92	12.75	NY 145 in Middleburgh village	Cotton Hill Road	CR 1B in Wright	
CR 67	1.38	2.22	CR 2A	Fuller Road in Jefferson	NY 10	
CR 68	2.38	3.83	CR 6	Lutheranville Road in Summit	Otsego County line	
CR 69	0.83	1.34	NY 10	Hill Road in Seward	NY 10	
CR 70	1.12	1.80	NY 7 in Schoharie	Zicha Road	CR 27 in Esperance	
CR 71	0.99	1.59	CR 13	Taber Road in Jefferson	CR 2	
CR 72	1.52	2.45	CR 11	Evergreen Road in Carlisle	US 20	

== See also ==
- County routes in New York
