= List of county routes in Montgomery County, New York =

County routes in Montgomery County, New York, are posted on street blade signs. They are typically otherwise unsigned; however, a handful of routes are also signed with the Manual on Uniform Traffic Control Devices-standard yellow-on-blue pentagon route marker.

== Routes 1–50 ==
Route	Length (mi)	Length (km)	From	Via	To	Notes
CR 1	2.17	3.5	NY 5	Swart Hill Road in Amsterdam	Schenectady County line (becomes CR 40)	
CR 2	3.47	5.6	NY 5	Cranes Hollow Road in Amsterdam	NY 67	
CR 3	1.89	3.04	NY 5	Antlers Road in Amsterdam	NY 67	
CR 4	0.91	1.46	CR 5	Belfance Road in Amsterdam	NY 67	
CR 5	1.25	2.01	McQuade Road	MacLachlan Road in Amsterdam	CR 2	
CR 6	0.71	1.14	CR 7	Waterstreet Road in Amsterdam	McQuade Road	
CR 7	1.94	3.12	NY 5	Truax Road in Amsterdam	NY 67 / CR 9	
CR 8	1.55	2.49	CR 157	Widow Susan Road in Amsterdam	Amsterdam city line	
CR 9	1.25	2.01	NY 67	Manny Corners Road in Amsterdam	Hagaman village line	
CR 10	1.86	2.99	CR 9	Jones Road in Amsterdam	NY 67	
CR 11	1.51	2.43	Hagaman village line	Hammondtown Road in Amsterdam	CR 12	
CR 12	1.20	1.93	NY 67	Morrow Road in Amsterdam	Fulton County line	
CR 13	0.71	1.14	Amsterdam city line	Northern Boulevard in Amsterdam	Hagaman village line	
CR 14	1.62	2.61	Amsterdam city line	Midline Road in Amsterdam	Fulton County line	
CR 15	0.86	1.38	NY 30	Wallins Cors Road in Amsterdam	CR 14	
CR 17	1.11	1.79	CR 40	Log City Road in Amsterdam	NY 30 / CR 39	
CR 18	1.46	2.35	CR 19	Golf Course Road in Amsterdam	NY 30	
CR 19	1.05	1.69	Amsterdam city line	Steadwell Road in Amsterdam	CR 20	
CR 20	1.62	2.61	Fort Johnson village line	Lepper Road in Amsterdam	Fulton County line	
CR 22	0.95	1.53	CR 38	Noonan Road in Amsterdam	Fulton County line	
CR 23	2.23	3.59	CR 28 in Mohawk	Sacandaga Road	Fulton County line in Amsterdam	
CR 24	0.37	0.60	NY 67	Bendick Corners Road in Amsterdam	Fulton County line (becomes CR 142)	
CR 26	3.90	6.28	NY 5 in Mohawk	Mohawk Drive	NY 5 in Amsterdam	Former routing of NY 5
CR 27	1.59	2.56	NY 5S in Florida	Main Street	CR 26 in Mohawk	
CR 28	2.71	4.36	CR 26	Stoners Trail Road in Mohawk	Fulton County line (becomes CR 103)	
CR 29	2.74	4.41	CR 30	Albany Bush Road in Mohawk	NY 67	
CR 30	7.51	12.09	NY 334	Old Trail Road in Mohawk	CR 26	
CR 31	2.22	3.57	NY 5	Switzer Hill Road in Mohawk	Fulton County line (becomes CR 148)	
CR 32	0.15	0.24	NY 334 in Fonda	Wemple Avenue	NY 30A in Mohawk	
CR 33	11.98	19.28	Nelliston village line in Palatine	Hickory Hill Road	NY 5 in Mohawk	
CR 34	11.15	17.94	NY 5 in Palatine	Stone Arabia Road	CR 35 in Mohawk	
CR 35	1.61	2.59	NY 5	Martin Road in Mohawk	NY 334	
CR 36	2.11	3.40	NY 334	Persse Road in Mohawk	Fulton County line (becomes CR 116A)	
CR 37	2.96	4.76	CR 34 in Palatine	Indian Road	Fulton County line in Mohawk	
CR 38	2.01	3.23	NY 67	McDonald Drive in Amsterdam	CR 40	
CR 39	1.20	1.93	NY 30	Maple Avenue Extension in Amsterdam	Hagaman village line	
CR 40	1.31	2.11	CR 18	McKay Road in Amsterdam	Fulton County line	
CR 41	4.11	6.61	CR 42 in Palatine	Oswegatchie Road	CR 33 in Palatine	
CR 42	3.54	5.70	NY 5	McKinley Road in Palatine	CR 43	
CR 43	2.60	4.18	NY 10	Dillenback Road in Palatine	CR 33	
CR 44	3.76	6.05	CR 42	Brower Road in Palatine	CR 42	
CR 45	1.63	2.62	CR 42	Caswell Road in Palatine	CR 43	
CR 46	1.70	2.74	NY 5 in Nelliston	Groff Road	NY 10 in Palatine	
CR 47	2.33	3.75	CR 48	Nellis Road in Palatine	NY 10	
CR 48	2.92	4.70	NY 5	Wagners Hollow Road in Palatine	NY 67	
CR 49	0.23	0.37	CR 44	Old McKinley Road in Palatine	CR 42	
CR 50	1.10	1.77	Fort Plain village line	Otsquago Club Road in Minden	Dead end	

== Routes 51–100 ==
Route	Length (mi)	Length (km)	From	Via	To	Notes
CR 51	0.34	0.55	CR 61	South St. Johnsville Road in Minden	Dead end	
CR 52	0.33	0.53	NY 10	New Turnpike Road in Palatine	NY 67	Formerly continued west to NY 5 near St. Johnsville village
CR 53	2.25	3.62	NY 67 in St. Johnsville	Burrell Road	Fulton County line in Palatine (becomes CR 140)	
CR 54	0.86	1.38	NY 5	Fox Road in St. Johnsville	NY 67	
CR 55	1.69	2.72	St. Johnsville village line	Kringsbush Road in St. Johnsville	Fulton County line	
CR 56	1.17	1.88	CR 57	Lassellville Road in St. Johnsville	Fulton County line (becomes CR 114)	
CR 57	3.16	5.09	Fulton County line	Crum Creek Road in St. Johnsville	St. Johnsville village line	Part north of Kennedy Road overlaps with NY 331
CR 58	1.60	2.57	NY 5	Mill Road in St. Johnsville	CR 57	
CR 59	2.63	4.23	CR 60	Clay Hill Road in St. Johnsville	Kennedy Road	
CR 60	0.30	0.48	Creek Road	Old State Road in St. Johnsville	NY 5	
CR 61	0.67	1.08	CR 65 in Minden	Bridge Street	NY 5 in St. Johnsville village	
CR 62	0.40	0.64	CR 57	Allen Heights Road in St. Johnsville	CR 57	
CR 63	0.64	1.03	CR 65	Mindenville Drive in Minden	Dead end	
CR 64	0.89	1.43	NY 163	Fisk Hill Road in Minden	CR 97 at Canajoharie town line	
CR 65	7.54	12.13	Dead end	River Road in Minden	NY 5S	
CR 66	3.73	6.00	CR 69	Sanders Road in Minden	CR 65	
CR 67	0.82	1.32	NY 5S	Airport Road in Minden	Airport Drive	
CR 68	3.68	5.92	CR 70	Paris Road in Minden	NY 5S	
CR 69	3.18	5.12	NY 80	Pickle Hill Road in Minden	Fort Plain village line	
CR 70	4.40	7.08	NY 80	Fordsbush Road in Minden	NY 5S	
CR 71	1.36	2.19	Herkimer County line (becomes CR 82)	Phillip Road in Minden	NY 80	
CR 72	0.92	1.48	Herkimer County line (becomes CR 206)	Lighthall Road in Minden	NY 80	
CR 73	4.32	6.95	CR 76	Brookmans Corners Road in Minden	NY 80	
CR 74	3.30	5.31	CR 73	Hessville Road in Minden	NY 163	
CR 75	4.32	6.95	CR 80	Salt Springville Road in Minden	CR 73	
CR 76	3.00	4.83	Herkimer County line (becomes CR 74)	Starkville Road in Minden	CR 77	
CR 77	2.48	3.99	CR 80	Indian Trail Road in Minden	NY 163	
CR 78	0.48	0.77	CR 80	Ripple Road in Minden	Otsego County line (becomes CR 32A)	
CR 79	2.92	4.70	CR 73	Freybush Road in Minden	NY 163	
CR 80	9.80	15.77	Otsego County line in Minden (becomes CR 31)	Clinton Road	Canajoharie village line in Canajoharie	
CR 81	1.01	1.63	Otsego County line (becomes CR 32S)	Van Deusenville Road in Canajoharie	NY 163	
CR 82	0.73	1.17	Otsego County line (becomes CR 32)	Cherry Valley Road in Canajoharie	NY 163	
CR 83	0.96	1.54	Otsego County line (becomes CR 32A)	Dugway Road in Canajoharie	CR 82	
CR 84	1.58	2.54	NY 163	Buel Road in Canajoharie	CR 80	
CR 85	2.33	3.75	CR 80	Dygert Road in Canajoharie	CR 86	
CR 86	3.52	5.66	NY 163 in Minden	Marshville Road	NY 10 in Canajoharie	
CR 87	1.93	3.11	CR 80	Seebers Lane in Canajoharie	Canajoharie village line	
CR 88	2.41	3.88	NY 163 in Canajoharie	West Ames Road	NY 10 / CR 89 in Ames	
CR 89	5.82	9.37	NY 10 / CR 88 in Ames	Latimer Hill Road	CR 102 in Root	
CR 90	2.43	3.91	CR 94	Maple Hill Road in Canajoharie	CR 94	
CR 91	2.80	4.51	CR 92	Blaine Road in Canajoharie	CR 93	Designated as part of NY 363 from 1930 to c. 1931 and as part of NY 361 from c. 1931 to April 1935.
CR 92	5.66	9.11	NY 10 in Canajoharie	Mapletown Road	CR 93 in Root	
CR 93	12.35	19.88	Canajoharie village line in Canajoharie	Carlisle Road	CR 104 in Root	Part north of CR 91 was designated as part of NY 363 from 1930 to c. 1931 and as part of NY 361 from c. 1931 to c. 1935; part between CR 91 and CR 96 was designated as part of NY 394 from 1930 to c. 1935 (Note: NY 363 and its successor, NY 361, continued north to NY 5S in the village of Canajoharie by way of Moyer, Montgomery, and Mitchell streets. Moyer Street is still state-maintained as NY 920T between Montgomery Street and a point midway between Third and Maple avenues.)
CR 94	4.87	7.84	NY 10	Old Sharon Road in Canajoharie	CR 93	
CR 96	2.52	4.06	CR 93	Hilltop Road in Root	NY 162	Designated as part of NY 394 from 1930 to c. 1935
CR 97	1.14	1.83	CR 80	Heiser Road in Canajoharie	CR 64 at Minden town line	
CR 98	2.00	3.22	CR 93	Flat Creek Road in Root	NY 162	
CR 99	4.04	6.50	CR 103	Lynk Street in Root	NY 162	
CR 100	1.93	3.11	CR 102	Mahr Road in Root	CR 93	

== Routes 101–150 ==
Route	Length (mi)	Length (km)	From	Via	To	Notes
CR 101	0.24	0.39	Schoharie County line (becomes CR 7)	Kilmartin Road in Root	CR 93	
CR 102	2.79	4.49	Schoharie County line (becomes CR 5A)	West Lykers Road in Root	CR 93 / CR 103	
CR 103	3.74	6.02	CR 93 / CR 102 in Root	East Lykers Road	NY 162 in Charleston	
CR 104	5.83	9.38	Schoharie County line in Charleston (becomes CR 7A)	Corbin Hill Road	NY 30A in Charleston	
CR 105	3.97	6.39	NY 162	Currytown Road in Root	NY 5S	
CR 106	3.44	5.54	CR 110	Anderson Road in Root	CR 105	
CR 107	0.26	0.42	CR 108	Sprakers Road in Root	NY 5S	
CR 108	0.69	1.11	NY 162	Sprakers Hill Road in Root	NY 5S	
CR 109	0.15	0.24	Herkimer County line (becomes CR 21)	Fordsbush Road Spur in Minden	CR 70	
CR 110	6.51	10.48	CR 125 in Root	Logtown Road	NY 30A in Glen	
CR 111	2.88	4.63	CR 110	Lansing Road in Glen	CR 118	
CR 112	3.94	6.34	NY 5S in Root	Argersinger Road	CR 116 in Glen	
CR 113	1.36	2.19	Fultonville village line	Glen Drive in Glen	Riverside Drive (NY 920P)	
CR 114	1.73	2.78	CR 115	Lusso Road in Glen	CR 116	
CR 115	2.24	3.60	CR 112	Borden Road in Glen	NY 5S	
CR 116	3.62	5.83	CR 118	Van Epps Road in Glen	Fultonville village line	
CR 117	3.33	5.36	CR 116	Ingersoll Road in Glen	NY 5S	
CR 118	2.78	4.47	CR 112	Fisher Road in Glen	NY 30A	
CR 119	2.32	3.73	I-90 / New York State Thruway exit 28	Riverside Drive in Glen	NY 5S	Former number; now part of NY 920P
CR 120	2.32	3.73	NY 161	Co-Daugh-Ri-Ty Road in Glen	CR 164	
CR 121	2.74	4.41	NY 30A in Charleston	Reynolds Road	NY 30A in Glen	
CR 122	2.92	4.70	NY 30A	Auriesville Road in Glen	NY 5S	
CR 123	1.61	2.59	CR 128 / CR 162 in Charleston	Hyney Hill Road	CR 110 in Glen	
CR 124	0.22	0.35	Herkimer County line (becomes CR 234)	Clark Road in Minden	Fordsbush Road	
CR 125	0.69	1.11	NY 162	Rural Grove Road in Root	NY 162	
CR 126	1.27	2.04	NY 162 in Root	South Green Road	CR 130 in Charleston	
CR 127	11.02	17.73	Brand Road	Burtonville Road in Charleston	Schoharie County line (becomes CR 28)	
CR 128	1.61	2.59	NY 30A	Polin Road in Charleston	CR 123 / CR 162	
CR 129	5.88	9.46	NY 30A in Charleston	Hughes Road	NY 161 in Glen	
CR 130	3.93	6.32	CR 125 in Root	Brand Road	CR 104 in Charleston	
CR 131	5.77	9.29	CR 104	Esperance Road in Charleston	Schoharie County line (becomes CR 44)	
CR 132	0.73	1.17	CR 128	Church Street in Charleston	NY 30A	
CR 133	1.34	2.16	Gordon Road	Gidley Road in Charleston	CR 127	
CR 134	0.10	0.16	CR 103	Charleston Street in Charleston	NY 162	
CR 135	0.12	0.19	NY 5S	Old River Road West in Root	Dead end	
CR 136	0.35	0.56	NY 5S	Old River Road in Root	NY 5S	
CR 137	0.10	0.16	NY 5S	Old River Road East in Root	Glen town line	
CR 138	0.10	0.16	CR 115	Old Borden Road in Glen	Dillenbeck Road	
CR 139	1.57	2.53	NY 30	Fuller Road in Florida	CR 147	
CR 140	1.57	2.53	Schenectady County line (becomes CR 149)	Peck Road in Florida	CR 142	
CR 141	2.10	3.38	CR 142	Merry Road in Florida	NY 30	
CR 142	3.92	6.31	Schenectady County line (becomes CR 145)	Miller Corners Road in Florida	CR 143	
CR 143	3.33	5.36	NY 161	Youngs Corners Road in Florida	NY 161	
CR 144	1.38	2.22	CR 143	Dunlap Road in Florida	NY 30	
CR 145	4.81	7.74	NY 30	Fort Hunter Road in Florida	NY 5S	
CR 146	2.71	4.36	CR 145	Snooks Corners Road in Florida	Amsterdam city line	
CR 147	2.69	4.33	CR 149	Beldons Road in Florida	NY 30	
CR 148	1.00	1.61	CR 147	Abraham Road in Florida	CR 165	
CR 149	4.88	7.85	NY 30	Langley Road in Florida	NY 5S	
CR 150	0.48	0.77	CR 149	Schuyler Road in Florida	CR 151	

== Routes 151 and up ==
Route	Length (mi)	Length (km)	From	Via	To	Notes
CR 151	5.91	9.51	NY 30	Bulls Head Road in Florida	NY 5S	
CR 152	3.85	6.20	NY 5S	Pattersonville Road in Florida	Schenectady County line (becomes CR 119)	
CR 153	2.49	4.01	CR 145	Sager Road in Florida	CR 146	
CR 154	3.14	5.05	NY 30	Sulphur Springs Road in Florida	NY 160	
CR 155	0.12	0.19	Amsterdam city line	East Cleveland Avenue in Florida	NY 5S	
CR 156	0.33	0.53	NY 5S	Broadway Extension in Florida	Amsterdam city line	
CR 157	1.26	2.03	Amsterdam city line	Chapman Drive in Amsterdam	CR 7	
CR 159	0.39	0.63	NY 30A	Hughes Road Spur in Charleston	CR 129	
CR 160	0.13	0.21	CR 127	Burtonville Road Spur in Charleston	Schenectady County line (becomes CR 102)	
CR 161	0.07	0.11	CR 151	Old Pattersonville Road in Florida	Local road	
CR 162	1.46	2.35	CR 127	North Green Road in Charleston	CR 123 / CR 128	
CR 163	0.76	1.22	NY 30	Miami Avenue in Amsterdam	CR 14	
CR 164	2.39	3.85	NY 161	Noeltner Road in Glen	NY 5S	Formerly NY 288
CR 165	4.43	7.13	NY 160	Thayer Road in Florida	NY 5S	Formerly part of NY 160
CR 166	0.09	0.14	NY 161	Noeltner Road Spur in Glen	CR 164	
CR 167	0.37	0.60	Queen Ann Street	Sandy Drive in Amsterdam city	End of road	

== See also ==
- County routes in New York
- List of former state routes in New York (301–400)
- List of reference routes in New York
