= New York State Route 30A =

Highway in New York

New York State Route 30A
- NY 30A highlighted in red

Route information
- Auxiliary route of NY 30
- Maintained by NYSDOT
- Length: 34.86 mi (56.10 km)
- Existed: April 1960–present

Major junctions
- South end: NY 30 in Schoharie
- I-88 in Schoharie; NY 7 in Schoharie; US 20 in Esperance; NY 5S in Fultonville; NY 5 in Fonda
- North end: NY 30 in Mayfield

Location
- Country: United States
- State: New York
- Counties: Schoharie, Montgomery, Fulton

Highway system
- New York Highways; Interstate; US; State; Reference; Parkways
← NY 30	→ NY 31

New York State Route 30A (NY 30A) is a 34.86-mile-long (56.10 km) state highway in the Capital District of New York in the United States. It serves as a westerly alternate route of NY 30 from near the Schoharie County village of Schoharie to the Fulton County hamlet of Riceville, 1 mile (1.6 km) south of the village of Mayfield. While NY 30 heads generally north–south between the two locations and passes through Amsterdam, NY 30A veers west to serve the villages of Fonda and Fultonville and the cities of Johnstown and Gloversville. Along the way, it connects to several major east–west highways, including U.S. Route 20 (US 20) in Esperance and the New York State Thruway in Fultonville.

All of NY 30A north of NY 7 in Central Bridge was originally designated as New York State Route 148 as part of the 1930 renumbering of state highways in New York, replacing NY 54 from Fonda to Mayfield. The piece of modern NY 30A south of NY 7 has been part of several routes, namely NY 30 from 1930 to the 1940s and NY 43 during the 1920s and from the 1940s to the 1950s. In April 1960, this piece of NY 43 was combined with NY 148 to create NY 30A.

== Route description ==
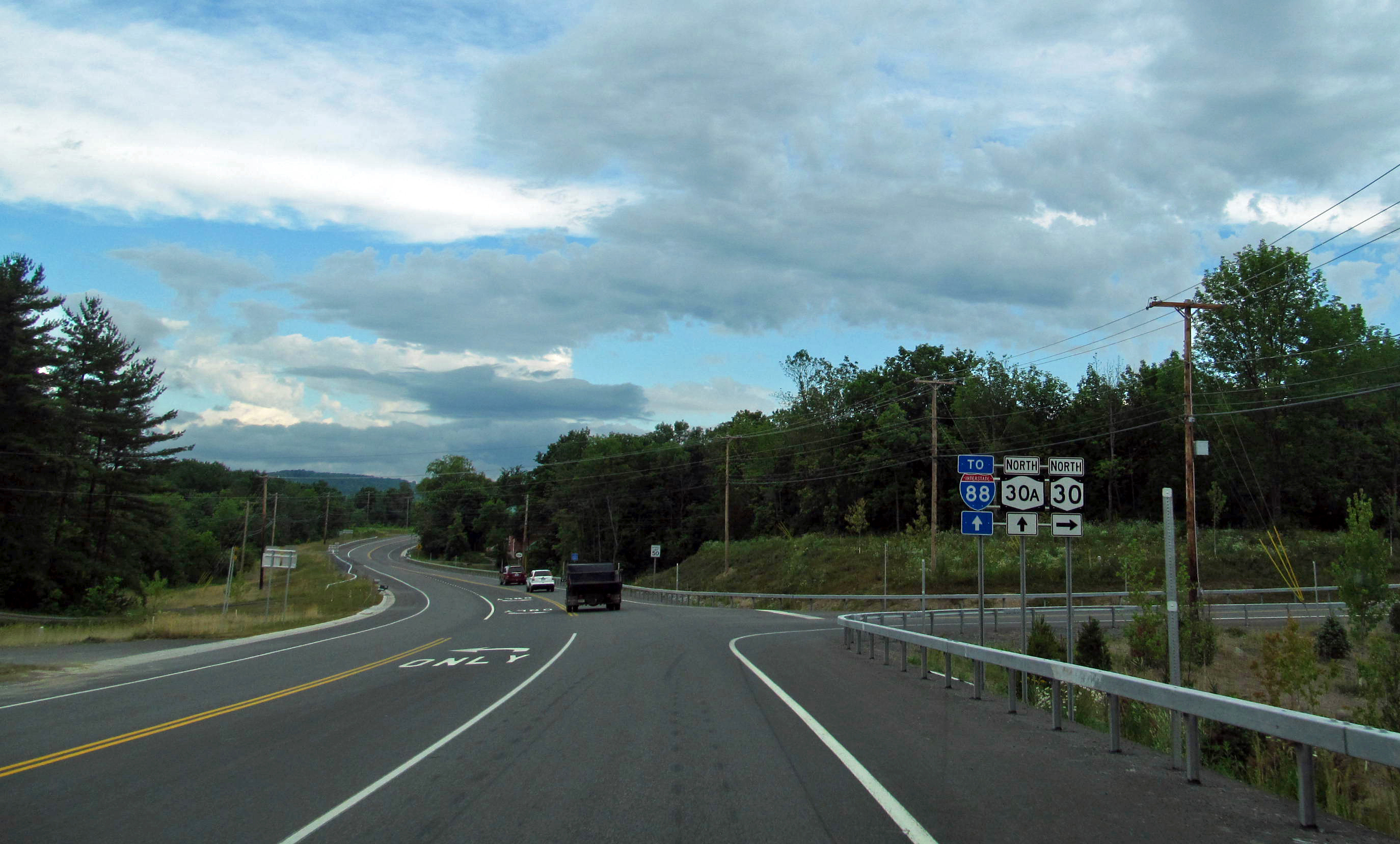
Southern terminus of NY 30A at NY 30 by Schoharie

NY 30A begins at an intersection with NY 30 in northern reaches of the village of Schoharie. Continuing northwest along the former right-of-way of NY 30, NY 30A crosses along Schoharie Creek into exit 23 of I-88, a diamond interchange. Just north of the interchange, the route reaches a junction with NY 7. At this junction, NY 30A turns west onto NY 7 and form a concurrency into the hamlet of Old Central Bridge after crossing Schoharie Creek. Several blocks west of the Schoharie, NY 30A turns north and away from NY 7, crossing north into Central Bridge. After crossing Cobleskill Creek, the route passes east of Central Bridge Community Park and a junction with County Route 51 (CR 51 or South Main Street).

Crossing through the residential section of Central Bridge, NY 30A bends northward, leaving the hamlet and crossing into the town of Esperance. Through Esperance, NY 30A winds northeast, bending along Schoharie Creek until a junction with CR 27 (Junction Road). At the junction with CR 27, NY 30A bends northward, crossing past residences as it enters the hamlet of Sloansville, at which NY 30A reaches a junction with US 20 and the southern terminus of NY 162, which becomes concurrent with NY 30A. The concurrency with NY 162 is a short stretch through Esperance, connecting Sloansville to Dwelly Corners, where NY 162 turns west.

NY 30A continues north from NY 162, crossing the line into Montgomery County and the town of Charleston. The route through Charleston is rural, passing through open fields and woodlands for several miles, making several sharp bends at road junctions. Just north of a junction with Reynolds Road (unsigned CR 121), the route winds northward into the town of Glen. Just north of the northern terminus of CR 121, the route reaches the hamlet of Glen, which is centered around a junction with NY 161. Through Glen, NY 30A turns several directions before leaving the hamlet to the northwest. A couple miles to the northwest of Glen, NY 30A crosses the town line and enters the village of Fultonville.

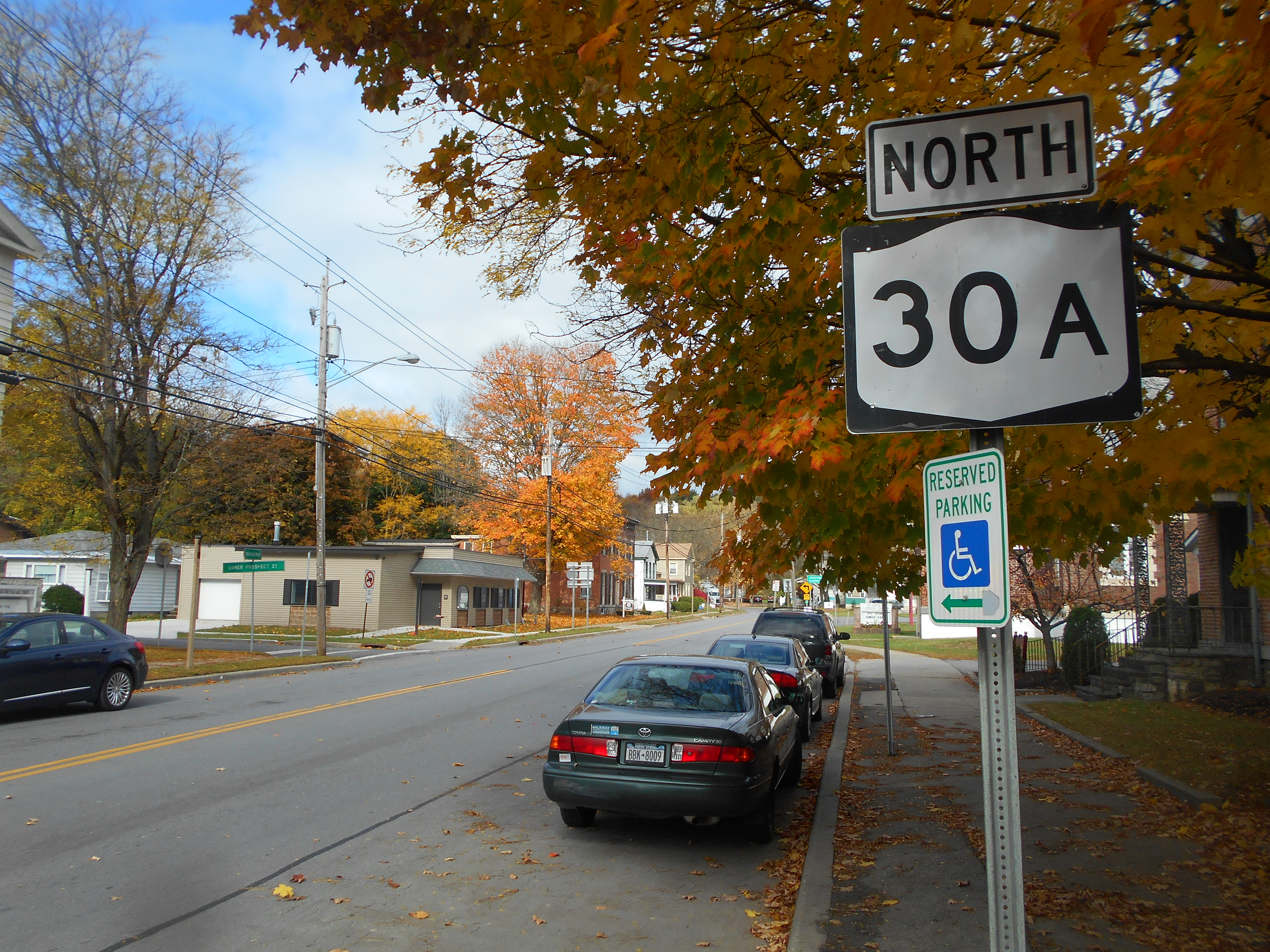
NY 30A northbound, heading away from NY 5 in Fonda

Through Fultonville, NY 30A gains the moniker of Main Street, crossing a junction with NY 5S (Maple Avenue), Entering downtown Fultonville, the route crosses through several blocks of businesses before reaching a junction with NY 920P (Riverside Drive), an unsigned reference route. NY 920P connects NY 30A to the New York State Thruway (I-90)'s exit 28. After Riverside Drive, NY 30A crosses the Mohawk River and enters the village of Fonda. Now named South Bridge Street, the route crosses past the Village of Fonda Recreation Park. After crossing over an Amtrak railroad line, NY 30A reaches a junction with NY 5 (East Main Street). At this junction, NY 30A turns west onto a concurrency with NY 5, crossing through the village.

At the junction with Broadway, NY 5 continues west through Fonda while NY 30A turns north on Broadway. Paralleling the nearby NY 334, which starts less than a mile to the west, NY 30A leaves Fonda for the town of Mohawk, where it gains the Old Plank Road moniker. NY 30A continues north through Mohawk, proceeding away from NY 334, soon bending northeast and crossing the county line into Fulton County and the town of Johnstown. Dropping the Old Plank Road name, NY 30A gains the South Comrie Avenue moniker as it enters the city of Johnstown. At Chestnut Street, the route turns eastward, crossing through the southern edges of the city, before turning north and bypassing the center of Johnstown. Along the bend, NY 30A reaches a junction with NY 67 (East State Street).

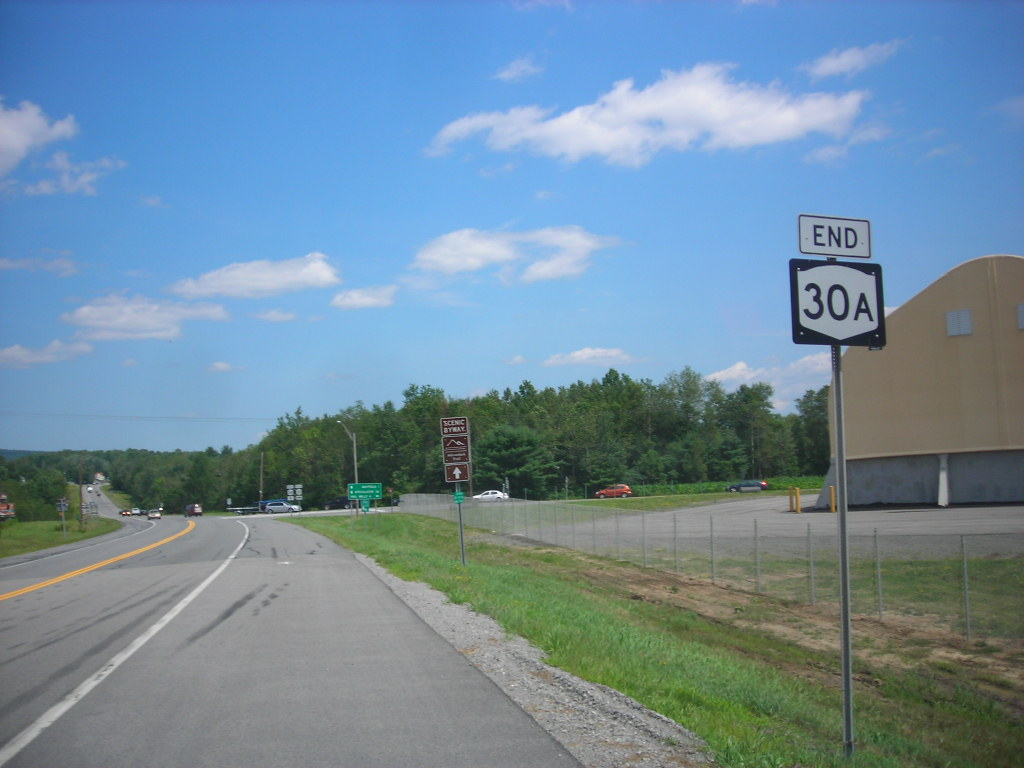
Northern terminus of NY 30A at NY 30 in Riceville

At a junction with the western terminus of CR 107 (East Main Street), the moniker of NY 30A switches to North Comrie Avenue, soon reaching a junction with NY 29. At this junction, NY 30A begins paralleling Cayadutta Creek, winding northeast through Johnstown. The route bypasses the city of Gloversville, reaching a junction with NY 29A (Turkey Farm Road) before crossing into a section of Gloversville. In this small section, NY 30A junctions with the terminus of NY 349 (East State Street). NY 30A and NY 349 now parallel each other out of Gloversville, crossing into the town of Mayfield. In Mayfield, NY 30A crosses through the hamlet of Riceville, where it meets an intersection with NY 30. This junction marks the northern terminus of NY 30A, less than a mile south of the entrance to Adirondack Park.

== History ==
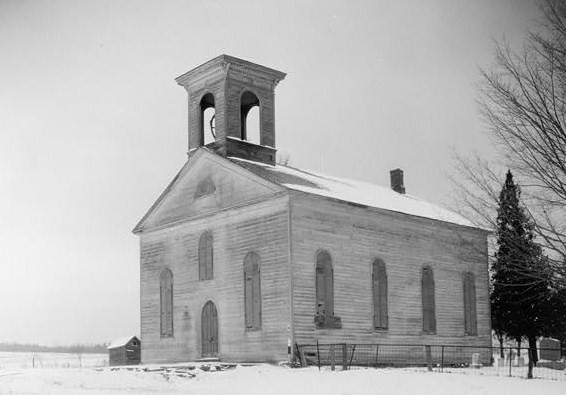
The Baptist Church in Charleston, photo taken in 1936, when NY 30A was still NY 148

In 1908, the New York State Legislature created Route 24, an unsigned legislative route that initially extended from Fonda to Lake Pleasant via Johnstown, Gloversville, Mayfield, and Speculator. From Fonda to the southern edge of Johnstown, Route 24 utilized modern NY 30A. Northeast of Gloversville, it followed East State Street, current County Route 154, and Riceville Road to Mayfield. In between, it was routed along several city streets in Johnstown and Gloversville. All of legislative Route 24 south of Speculator was designated as part of NY 54 in the mid-1920s. Like Route 24 before it, NY 54 followed a series of local streets through Johnstown and Gloversville. It entered Johnstown on Chestnut Street and proceeded northward through the city on Madison Avenue and Perry Street. In Gloversville, Perry Street became Main Street, which NY 54 followed to State Street.

NY 54 was reassigned elsewhere in the state as part of the 1930 renumbering of state highways in New York. The portion of NY 54's former alignment south of Mayfield became part of NY 148, a new route that extended from NY 7 in Central Bridge to NY 30 in Mayfield. The section of modern NY 30A south of NY 7 was initially designated as part of NY 43 in the mid-1920s before becoming part of NY 30 in 1930. In the early 1940s, NY 30 was rerouted to follow a new highway that left the old alignment of NY 30 southeast of Central Bridge and connected directly to the portion of NY 30 north of NY 7. The former routing of NY 30 into Central Bridge became an extension of NY 43, which overlapped NY 30 between the new alignment and Schoharie.

In 1956 and 1957, an arterial highway was constructed between Johnstown and Mayfield by way of Gloversville. The new roadway became a realignment of NY 148. Johnstown's portion of the arterial includes direct access to businesses as the city purchased the necessary access rights from the state of New York. The portion of NY 43 north of NY 30 and all of NY 148 was re-designated as NY 30A in April 1960 after pressure from local Automobile Club.

The intersection with NY 30 north of the Village of Schoharie was the site of a deadly limousine crash in October 2018 that killed 20 people.

== Major intersections ==
County	Location	mi	km	Destinations	Notes
Schoharie	Town of Schoharie	0.00	0.00	NY 30 – Schoharie, Duanesburg	Southern terminus
Schoharie	Town of Schoharie	0.96	1.54	I-88 – Albany, Binghamton	Exit 23 (I-88); diamond interchange
Schoharie	Town of Schoharie	1.15	1.85	NY 7 east to NY 30 – Esperance, Amsterdam	Eastern terminus of NY 7 overlap
Schoharie	Town of Schoharie	2.19	3.52	NY 7 west – Cobleskill	Hamlet of Central Bridge; western terminus of NY 7 overlap
Schoharie	Town of Esperance	6.12	9.85	US 20 – Sharon, Duanesburg NY 162 begins	Hamlet of Sloansville; southern terminus of NY 162
Schoharie	Town of Esperance	6.92	11.14	NY 162 north – Canajoharie	Northern terminus of NY 162 overlap
Montgomery	Glen	16.76	26.97	NY 161 east – Auriesville, Amsterdam	Western terminus of NY 161
Montgomery	Fultonville	20.65	33.23	NY 5S (Maple Avenue) – Canajoharie, Auriesville	
Montgomery	Fultonville	20.95	33.72	To I-90 / New York Thruway	Access via NY 920P
Montgomery	Fonda	21.30	34.28	NY 5 east (Main Street) – Amsterdam	Eastern terminus of NY 5 overlap
Montgomery	Fonda	21.67	34.87	NY 5 west (Main Street) – Palatine Bridge	Western terminus of NY 5 overlap
Fulton	City of Johnstown	26.17	42.12	NY 67 (East State Street) – FMCC	
Fulton	City of Johnstown	26.53	42.70	NY 29 west (East Main Street) – Johnstown	Southern terminus of NY 29 overlap
Fulton	City of Johnstown	26.96	43.39	NY 29 east (Briggs Street) – Vail Mills, Saratoga	Northern terminus of NY 29 overlap
Fulton	City of Johnstown	26.96	43.39	Briggs Street ( NY 920C west)	Eastern terminus of unsigned NY 920C
Fulton	Gloversville	28.19	45.37	Harrison Street (NY 920D)	
Fulton	Town of Johnstown	29.91	48.14	Saratoga Boulevard / Steele Avenue Extension (NY 920J)	Former routing of NY 29A; former southern terminus of overlap with NY 29A
Fulton	Town of Johnstown	30.55	49.17	NY 29A (East Fulton Street / Turkey Farm Road) – Gloversville, Vail Mills	Former northern terminus of NY 29A overlap
Fulton	Town of Johnstown	31.76	51.11	NY 349 east (East State Street Extension)	Western terminus of NY 349
Fulton	Town of Mayfield	34.86	56.10	NY 30 – Mayfield, Speculator, Vail Mills	Northern terminus; hamlet of Riceville; roundabout
1.000 mi = 1.609 km; 1.000 km = 0.621 mi: Concurrency terminus

== See also ==
- List of county routes in Fulton County, New York
