= New York State Route 103 =

State highway in Schenectady County, New York, US

New York State Route 103
- NY 103 highlighted in red

Route information
- Maintained by NYSDOT
- Length: 0.50 mi (800 m)
- Existed: early 1930s–present

Major junctions
- South end: NY 5S in Rotterdam
- North end: NY 5 in Glenville

Location
- Country: United States
- State: New York
- Counties: Schenectady

Highway system
- New York Highways; Interstate; US; State; Reference; Parkways
| ← NY 102 | → NY 104 |

New York State Route 103 (NY 103) is a state highway in Schenectady County, New York, in the United States. It runs for just 0.50 miles (0.80 km) from an intersection with NY 5S in the hamlet of Rotterdam Junction to NY 5 in the town of Glenville. In between, the route crosses the Mohawk River at Erie Canal at Lock 9. When it was assigned in the early 1930s, it was the only crossing of the Mohawk River between Pattersonville and downtown Schenectady. It later became the only bridge between Amsterdam and Schenectady. Its regional importance declined following the completion of NY 890 near Schenectady in 1998. In late 2011, NY 103 was closed for three months to repair parts of the road damaged by Hurricane Irene and Tropical Storm Lee.

== Route description ==
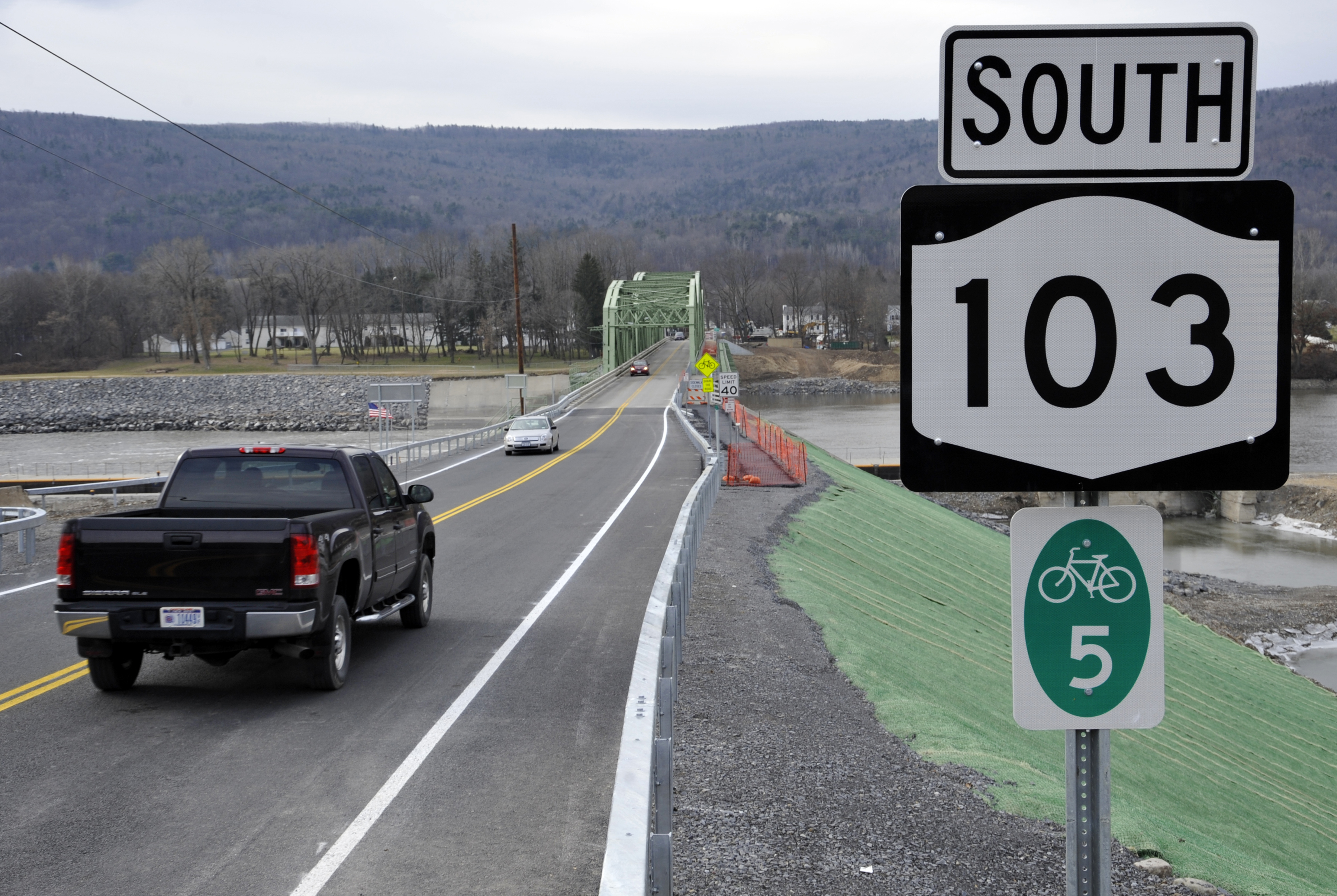
NY 103 heading southbound from NY 5 in Glenville

NY 103 begins at an intersection with NY 5S in Rotterdam Junction, a hamlet in the town of Rotterdam. The highway heads northward as the two-lane Bridge Street, serving a block of homes as it intersects Alexander Drive and Leonard Road. An intersection with Riverside Drive marks the end of the second block and the start of the third, where NY 103 passes the only bit of commercial activity along the highway. From here, the route leaves the hamlet and begins to rise as it crosses a steel truss bridge over the Mohawk River, here part of the Erie Canal. The last third of the span crosses Erie Canal Lock 9. On the north side of the river, the route serves Lock 9 State Park before terminating at an intersection with NY 5 in a rural part of the town of Glenville.

The entirety of NY 103 is part of New York State Bicycle Route 5 (NY Bike Route 5), a cross-state bicycle route extending from Niagara Falls to the Massachusetts state line at New Lebanon. NY Bike Route 5 continues west from NY 103 on NY 5S and east from NY 103 on NY 5.

== History ==
=== Designation ===
The connector over the Mohawk River between Rotterdam Junction and Glenville was designated NY 103 in the early 1930s. At the time, it was one of only two river crossings between Amsterdam and Schenectady, a distance of 15 miles (24 km); the other connected the hamlets of Pattersonville and Hoffmans 2 miles (3.2 km) to the northwest. The Pattersonville–Hoffmans crossing was eliminated c. 1938, leaving NY 103 as the only means over the river between Amsterdam and Schenectady. The New York State Thruway was constructed along the southern bank of the river in the early 1950s; however, NY 103 retained its importance as part of a toll-free alternate route between Amsterdam (via NY 5) and Schenectady (NY 5S). The route also served as a bypass of Scotia, a village west of Schenectady on NY 5.

From the early 1970s up through the late 1990s, traffic at the east end of NY 5S fed directly into Interstate 890 (I-890); likewise, traffic on I-890 west could only access NY 5S or the Thruway. In order to travel between Thruway exit 26 and the north side of the Mohawk River, travelers would have to use either the NY 5 bridge in downtown Schenectady or NY 103. A connector leading north from Thruway exit 26 to NY 5 west of Scotia was completed in 1998 and designated NY 890. The new road lessened the importance of NY 103 as it provided a river crossing that both bypassed Scotia and directly connected to the Thruway. However, NY 103 continues to serve as the only access road to Lock 9 of the Erie Canal and its nearby picnic and fishing area.

=== Damage after Irene and Lee ===
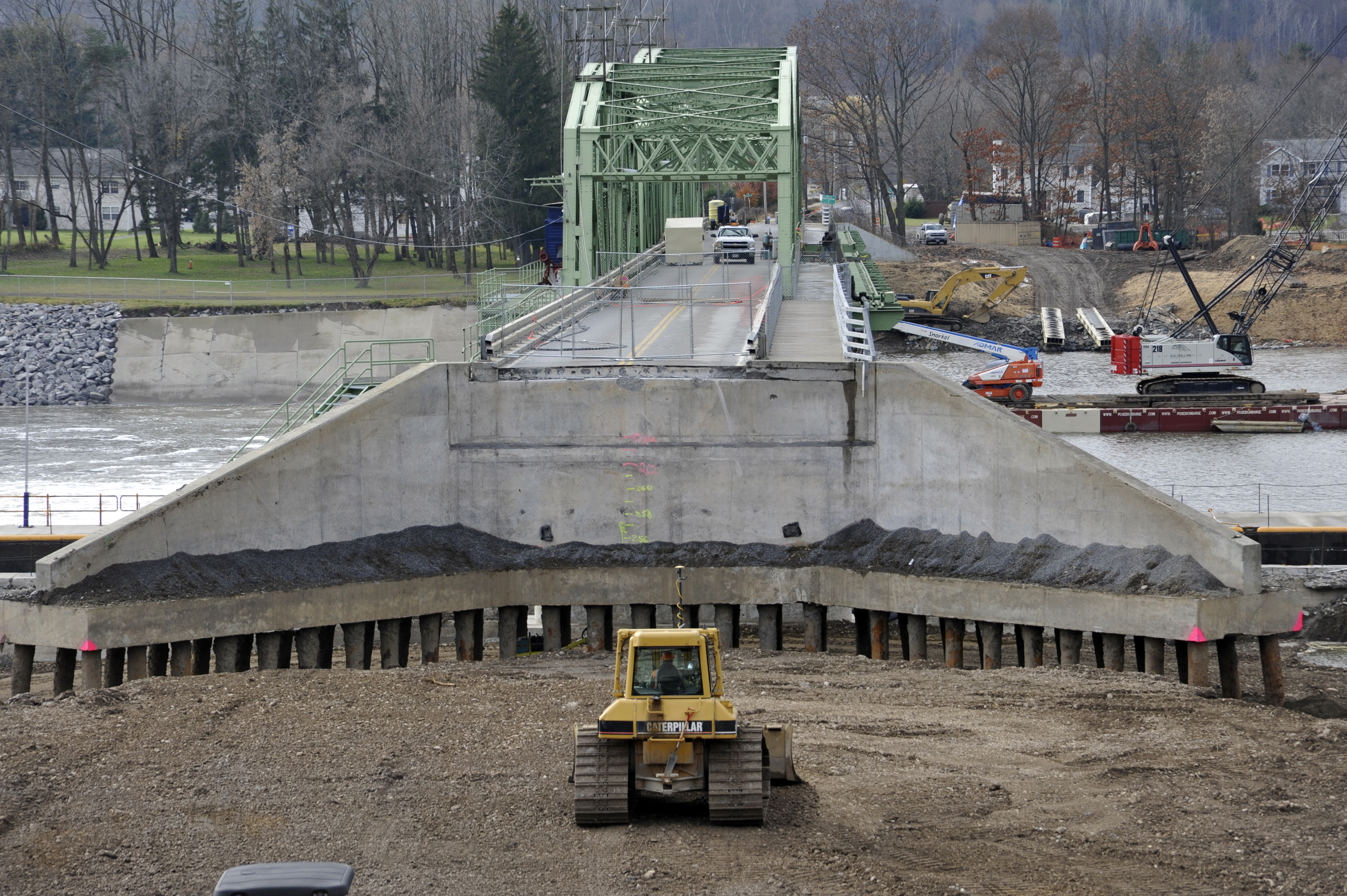
Reconstruction of NY 103 just south of the intersection with NY 5 after damage from Hurricane Irene and Tropical Storm Lee.

The bridge carrying NY 103 over the Mohawk River was significantly damaged in September 2011 by flooding and debris from Hurricane Irene and Tropical Storm Lee. State officials considered the damage to the structure to be "serious", and worries arose over the bridge's structural integrity. Officials from the state of New York considered reopening the bridge on September 7, but decided against it over concerns that approaching rains would cause further damage to the structure. On a related note, the flooding also caused the Mohawk River to carve a new route through the area around Rotterdam Junction. A portion of NY 103 north of the bridge was undermined by the new course, and it collapsed into the river on September 8. Also damaged was Lock 9, which adjoins the NY 103 bridge over the Mohawk River.

For the next three months, the bridge over the Mohawk River and NY 103 remained closed while repairs were made to the 400-foot (120 m) long collapsed section of roadway near NY 5. This section also had structural issues due to the flooding. The project cost $3 million, paid for by federal aid received by United States Senators Charles Schumer and Kirsten Gillibrand, and was completed by the New York State Department of Transportation (NYSDOT) on December 22, 2011, two weeks earlier than planned. In all, NY 5 received 115,000 cubic yards (88,000 m^{3}) of soil and 5,500 cubic yards (4,200 m^{3}) of stone to protect the roadway from future floods. NY 103 had its roadway reconstructed, a new sidewalk installed on the western side of the highway, and new signage and guide rails installed in both directions. NYSDOT plans to repave NY 103 in early 2012.

== Major intersections ==
The entire route is in Schenectady County.

| Location | mi | km | Destinations | Notes |
|---|---|---|---|---|
| Town of Rotterdam | 0.00 | 0.00 | NY 5S (Main Street) | Southern terminus; hamlet of Rotterdam Junction |
| Glenville | 0.50 | 0.80 | NY 5 (Amsterdam Road) – Amsterdam, Scotia | Northern terminus |
1.000 mi = 1.609 km; 1.000 km = 0.621 mi
