= New York State Route 334 =

Highway in New York

New York State Route 334
- Map of Mohawk Valley in eastern New York with NY 334 highlighted in red

Route information
- Maintained by NYSDOT
- Length: 5.96 mi (9.59 km)
- Existed: 1930–present

Major junctions
- South end: NY 5 in Fonda
- North end: NY 67 in Johnstown

Location
- Country: United States
- State: New York
- Counties: Montgomery, Fulton

Highway system
- New York Highways; Interstate; US; State; Reference; Parkways
← NY 333	→ NY 335

New York State Route 334 (NY 334) is a north–south state highway in the Mohawk Valley region of New York in the United States. It extends for 5.96 miles (9.59 km) from an intersection with NY 5 in the village of Fonda to a junction with NY 67 in the town of Johnstown. The highway is two lanes wide for its entire length, with the exception of a long climbing lane northbound leaving the hamlet of Sammonsville, located 1.5 miles (2.4 km) southwest of NY 67.

== Route description ==
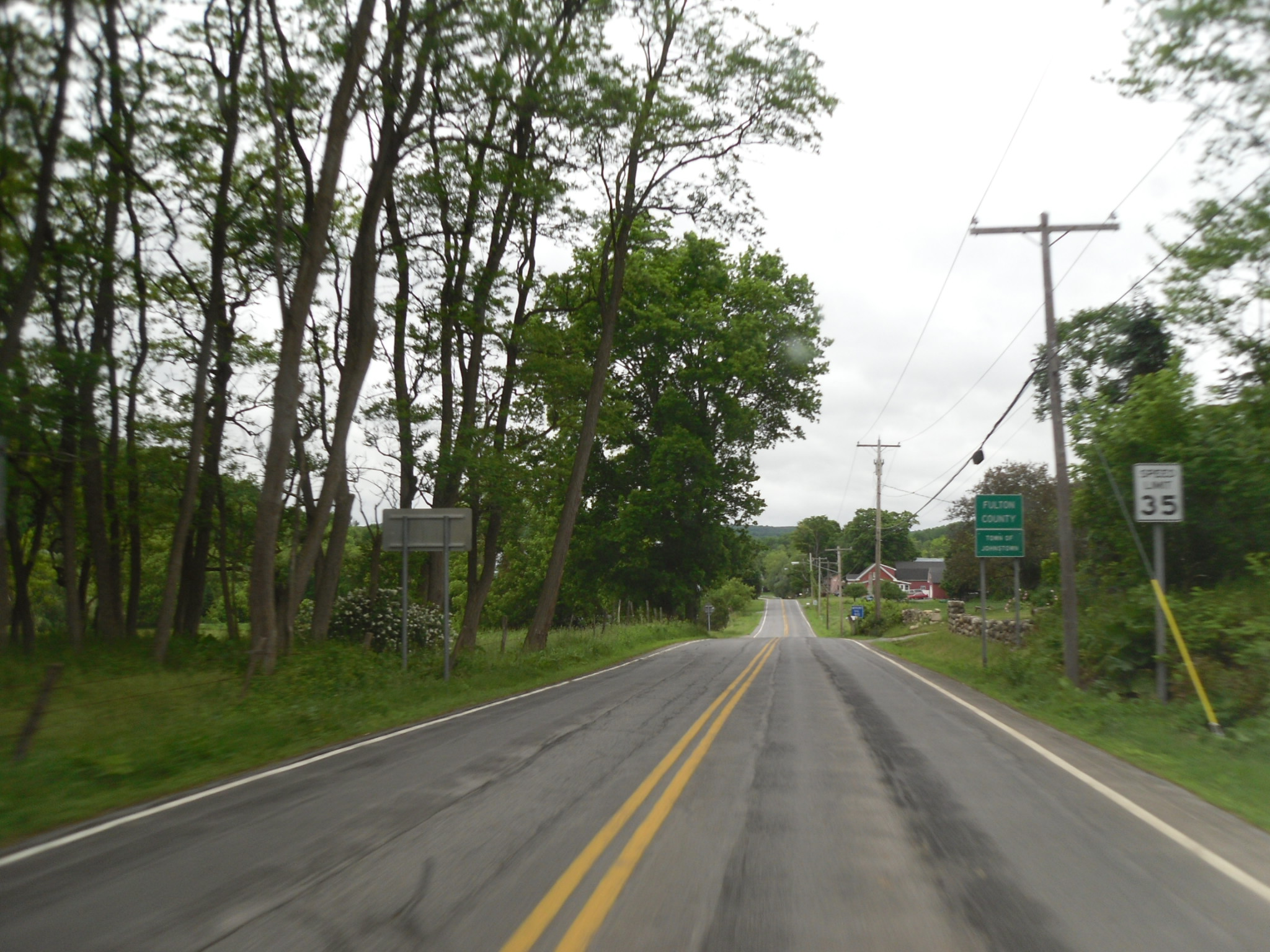
NY 334 at the Fulton County–Montgomery County line in Mohawk

NY 334 begins at an intersection with NY 5 (West Main Street) just east of NY 30A (Broadway) in the village of Fonda. NY 334 proceeds north on Cayadutta Street, a two-lane residential street on the western end of Fonda. Crossing past a former Fonda, Johnstown, and Gloversville Railroad bridge, the route leaves Fonda near Wemple Avenue, crossing into the town of Mohawk. Paralleling Cuyadutta Creek to the south, NY 334 passes a large creek-side factory, crossing under a bridge of the Fonda, Johnstown and Gloversville, soon proceeding west across the creek. Now a residential street, NY 334 winds westward along the southern side of the creek, soon bending northwest through Mohawk, entering the hamlet of Berryville.

In Berryville, NY 334 becomes a two-lane rural roadway, intersecting with the northern terminus of County Route 35 (CR 35; Martin Road). At this junction, NY 334 goes northwest through Mohawk, leaving the hamlet of Berryville as it crosses over Cayadutta Creek once again. The creek and highway begin paralleling each other once again, crossing another former railroad alignment before intersecting with the western terminus of CR 30 (Old Trail Road). At CR 30, NY 334 takes over the former's right-of-way, which crosses northwest into Fulton County and the town of Johnstown. Now a two-lane residential street, NY 334 proceeds northwest into the hamlet of Sammonsville.

In Sammonsville, NY 334 intersects with Electric Light Road and the eastern terminus of CR 116. At CR 116, NY 334 leaves Sammonsville on a northeastern alignment through Johnstown. Northeast of Sammonsville, the route becomes a two-lane farm road, passing several homes in between fields. A short distance later, NY 334 enters a junction with Union Avenue Extension and NY 67, which serves as the northern terminus of NY 334. The right-of-way continues east on NY 67 into the city of Johnstown.

== History ==
Most of what is now NY 334 was originally improved to state highway standards in the early 20th century as part of three separate projects. The first section of the road to be brought up to standards was the piece between the Fonda village line and the hamlet of Berryville, legislatively designated as State Highway 302 (SH 302). Construction on the road took roughly 18 months, and the highway was added to the state highway system on January 21, 1908. The portion of modern NY 334 in Fulton County was designated SH 619 and accepted into the state highway system on January 7, 1918, following two years of work to rebuild the road. The segment between the two improved highways was assigned SH 515 and improved under a contract let on November 2, 1916. It was 16% complete as of the end of 1918 and finished by 1926. The three unsigned state highways were designated as NY 334 as part of the 1930 renumbering of state highways in New York.

== Major intersections ==
County	Location	mi	km	Destinations	Notes
Montgomery	Fonda	0.00	0.00	NY 5 (West Main Street) – Amsterdam, Palatine Bridge	Southern terminus
Fulton	Town of Johnstown	5.96	9.59	NY 67	Northern terminus
1.000 mi = 1.609 km; 1.000 km = 0.621 mi
