= New York State Route 163 =

State highway in Montgomery County, New York, US

New York State Route 163
- NY 163 highlighted in red

Route information
- Maintained by NYSDOT
- Length: 11.97 mi (19.26 km)
- Existed: 1930–present

Major junctions
- West end: NY 5S / NY 80 in Fort Plain
- East end: NY 10 in Canajoharie

Location
- Country: United States
- State: New York
- Counties: Montgomery

Highway system
- New York Highways; Interstate; US; State; Reference; Parkways
← NY 162	→ NY 164

New York State Route 163 (NY 163) is an 11.97-mile-long (19.26 km) east–west state highway in Montgomery County, New York, in the United States. It runs in the shape of a C from an intersection with NY 5S and NY 80 in the village of Fort Plain to a junction with NY 10 in the town of Canajoharie. With the exception of its eastern terminus, NY 163 is not signed with directions. Reference markers indicate its terminus in Fort Plain to be its western, although the route heads nearly due southward until Sprout Brook. Approaching that hamlet, it is named Cherry Valley Road, and when NY 163 turns left to head eastward, County Route 82 (CR 82) continues that road name directly to NY 166 which leads to Cherry Valley. In Fort Plain, NY 163 follows Kellogg and Douglas streets. NY 163 is a two-lane highway for its entire length. The route was assigned as part of the 1930 renumbering of state highways in New York and originally continued north to the village of Canajoharie via NY 10.

== Route description ==
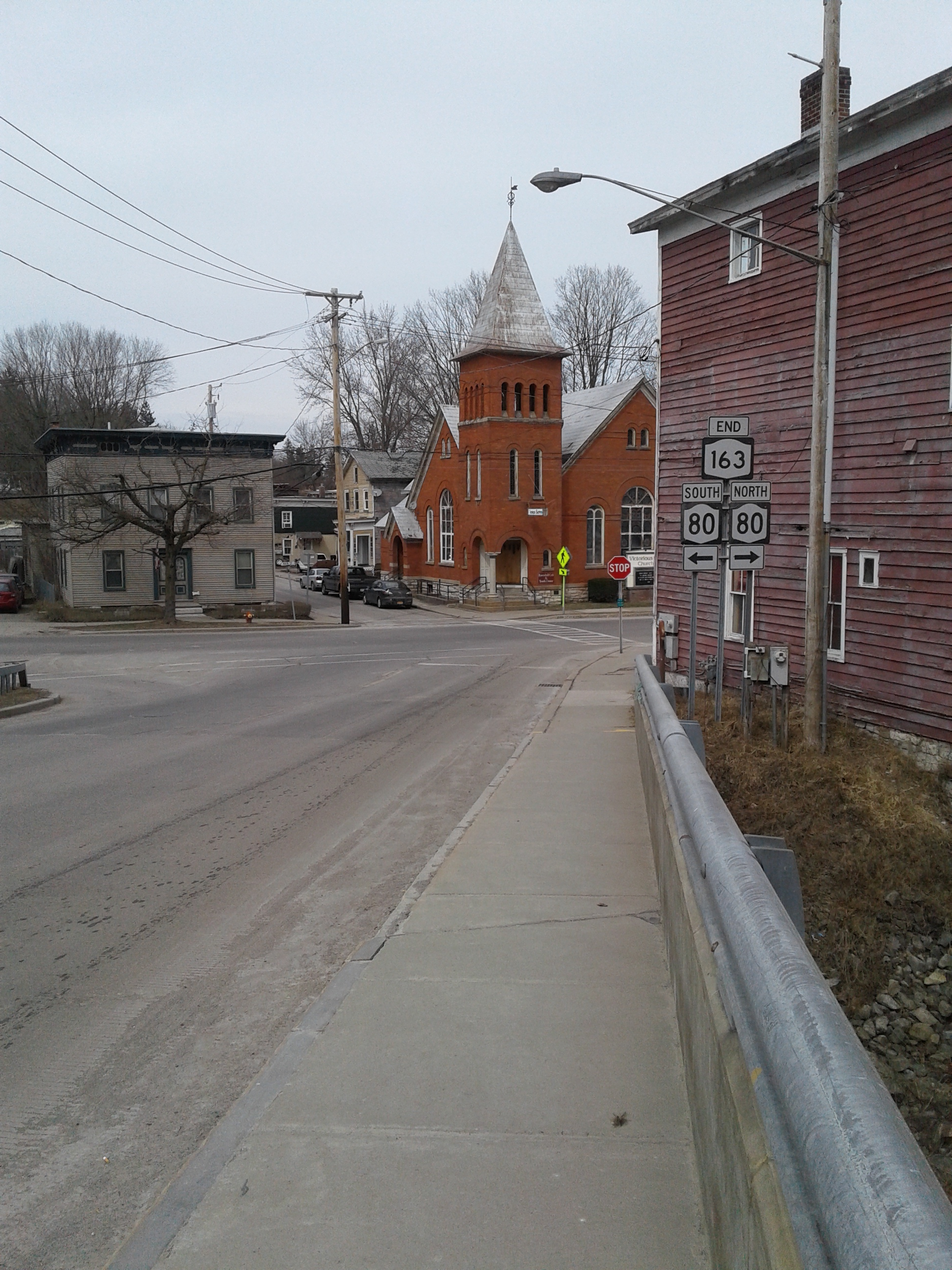
NY 163's signed western terminus at NY 80 in Fort Plain

NY 163 begins at an intersection with NY 5S and NY 80 (Main Street) in the village of Fort Plain, although it is signed as ending at NY 80 south of NY 5S. The route heads southwest along Main Street through Fort Plain, overlapping with NY 80 as it passes multiple commercial businesses near the village center. At Kellogg Street, NY 80 and NY 163 separate, with the former continuing along Main Street and the latter turning southward onto Kellogg Street. After crossing over Otsquago Creek, NY 163 intersects with Clinton Avenue, where the route turns west along the creek. At the junction with Garfield Street, the name changes to Douglass Street, which runs alongside the Otsquago through a residential section of Fort Plain. Just after the junction with Honey Hill Road, the route crosses into the town of Minden, changing names to Cherry Valley Road.

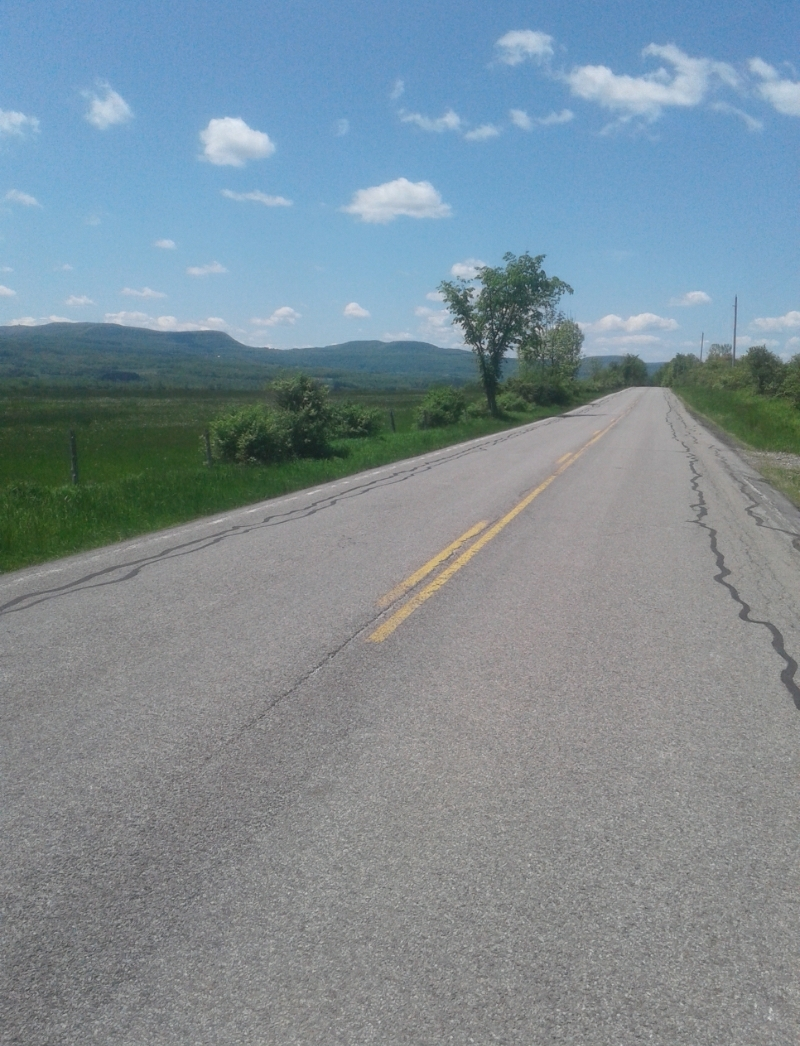
NY 163 located east of Buel with Mount Independence in background (top left)

Through Minden, NY 163 winds southwest as a two-lane rural roadway, crossing a junction with Fisk Hill Road (unsigned CR 64). Continuing southwest, NY 163 crosses into the residential hamlet of Freysbush, leaving the small community for a junction with Freysbush Road (CR 79). At this junction, NY 163 turns south, passing through Minden past a junction with Marshville Road (CR 86), where it turns southwest. The two-lane rural roadway remains the same for a couple miles, crossing into the hamlet of Hessville and a junction with Indian Trail Road (CR 77). Just south of that junction, NY 163 turns southeast into the town of Canajoharie.

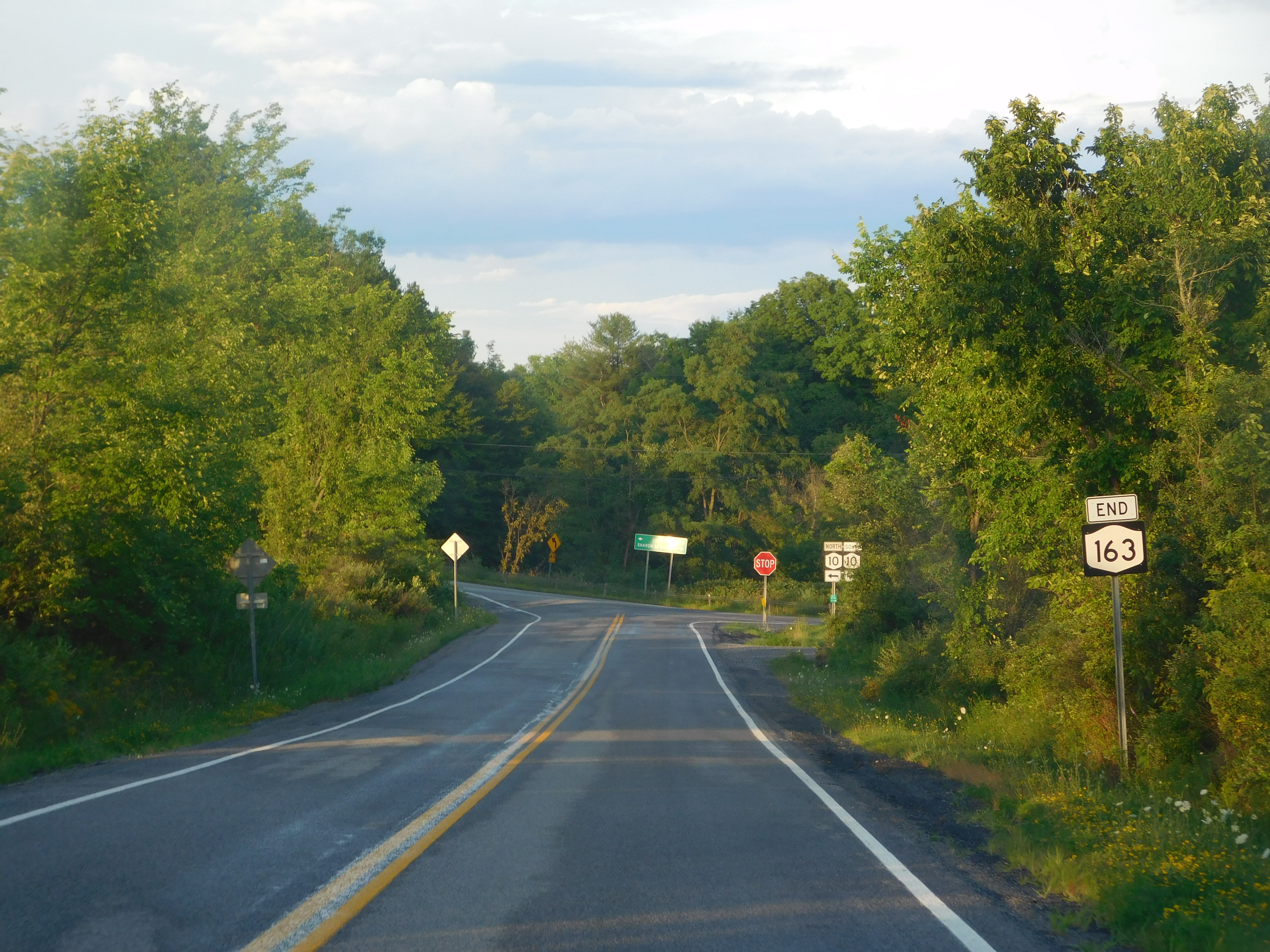
NY 163 eastbound ahead of the route's east end at NY 10 in Canajoharie

NY 163 crosses through the town of Canajoharie, entering the hamlet of Sprout Brook. In Sprout Brook, NY 163 reaches a junction with CR 82, where the route drops the Cherry Valley Road moniker. Now running eastward through Sprout Brook, NY 163 begins paralleling Canajoharie Creek, crossing into the hamlet of Buel. Just east of Buel, the route junctions with West Ames Road (CR 88), at which point NY 163 turns northeastward. The highway soon passes a local golf club before ending at an intersection with NY 10 several miles south of the village of Canajoharie.

== History ==
The highways that comprise the C-shaped NY 163 were acquired by the state of New York in the early 20th century. On January 18, 1907, the state let a contract to improve the section east of the hamlet of Sprout Brook to state highway standards. It was added to the state highway system in July 1910 as unsigned State Highway 345 (SH 345). The section between Sprout Brook and Main Street in Fort Plain was rebuilt under a project contracted out on July 15, 1915, and accepted into the state highway system on November 15, 1918, as SH 410. In the 1930 renumbering of state highways in New York, hundreds of state-maintained highways were assigned a posted route number for the first time. SH 345 and SH 410 were designated as part of NY 163, which overlapped with NY 80 and NY 10 to connect to NY 5S in Fort Plain and Canajoharie, respectively. The overlap with NY 10 was eliminated at some point between 1977 and 1993.

== Major intersections ==
The entire route is in Montgomery County.

Location	mi	km	Destinations	Notes
Fort Plain	0.00	0.00	NY 5S / NY 80 north (Canal Street / Main Street)	Western terminus; eastern terminus of NY 80 overlap
Fort Plain	0.15	0.24	NY 80 south (Main Street)	Western terminus of NY 80 overlap; signed western terminus
Town of Canajoharie	11.97	19.26	NY 10 (Ames Road) – Canajoharie, Sharon Springs	Eastern terminus
1.000 mi = 1.609 km; 1.000 km = 0.621 mi: Concurrency terminus
