= New York State Route 920P =

State highway in New York State

New York State Route 920P
- Riverside Drive
- Map of Montgomery County in eastern New York with NY 920P highlighted in red

Route information
- Maintained by NYSDOT
- Length: 2.20 mi (3.54 km)

Major junctions
- West end: NY 30A in Fultonville
- I-90 Toll / New York Thruway in Fultonville
- East end: NY 5S in Glen

Location
- Country: United States
- State: New York
- Counties: Montgomery

Highway system
- New York Highways; Interstate; US; State; Reference; Parkways

New York State Route 920P (NY 920P) is an unsigned reference route designation for Riverside Drive in the Montgomery County town of Glen, New York, in the United States. The roadway connects NY 30A and NY 5S to exit 28 of the New York State Thruway (Interstate 90 or I-90) in the village of Fultonville. Most of Riverside Drive runs alongside the Mohawk River. Although the route is inventoried by the New York State Department of Transportation (NYSDOT) as NY 920P, the reference markers bear the number 862.

The section of the route east of the Thruway interchange was originally maintained by Montgomery County and designated County Route 119 (CR 119). In 1981, the state of New York assumed ownership and maintenance of CR 119 as part a highway maintenance swap with the county. The new state highway subsequently became part of NY 920P.

== Route description ==
NY 920P begins at an intersection with NY 30A in the village of Fultonville. The route, named Riverside Drive, heads eastward along the Mohawk River, paralleling the New York State Thruway (I-90) and NY 5S to the south. It initially serves a residential area of the village; however, the houses quickly give way to an area of truck stops and other businesses—predominately dining, fuel, and lodging—surrounding Riverside Drive's interchange with the Thruway on the eastern edge of the village. Past exit 28, the development along the highway slowly decreases in density as Riverside Drive heads through the town of Glen.

About 1.4 miles (2.3 km) from NY 30A, the businesses cease completely while the road curves southward and heads uphill to an overpass carrying the road over the Thruway. Past the Thruway, NY 920P turns back to the east, loosely following the Thruway through an undeveloped, wooded area of the town. Riverside Drive ends 0.5 miles (0.80 km) from the Thruway overpass at a junction with NY 5S 1 mile (1.6 km) west of the hamlet of Auriesville. The Montgomery County Correctional Facility is located across from Riverside Drive on the south side of NY 5S.

== History ==
By 1978, the portion of Riverside Drive west of the interchange with the New York State Thruway was a short state highway maintained by NYSDOT; however, the remainder of the roadway east to NY 5S was maintained by Montgomery County as CR 119. On April 1, 1981, maintenance and ownership of both CR 119 and CR 52 in northwestern Montgomery County (now NY 67) were transferred to New York State in exchange for a reference route in Glen and then-NY 160 north of Scotch Church (now CR 122 and CR 165, respectively). The entirety of Riverside Drive remains state-maintained to this day as NY 920P.

== Future ==
NY 920P's reference markers bear the number "862", a number reserved for later use by the New York State Department of Transportation. What the number is reserved for is not clear.

== Major intersections ==
The entire route is in Montgomery County.

Location	mi	km	Destinations	Notes
Fultonville	0.00	0.00	NY 30A to NY 5 / NY 5S – Fonda, Johnstown	Western terminus
Fultonville	0.55	0.89	I-90 Toll / New York Thruway	Exit 28 on I-90 / Thruway
Glen	2.20	3.54	NY 5S – Fultonville, Auriesville	Eastern terminus
1.000 mi = 1.609 km; 1.000 km = 0.621 mi: Electronic toll collection

== See also ==
- List of county routes in Montgomery County, New York
