= New York State Route 162 =

State highway in eastern New York, US

New York State Route 162
- Map of eastern New York with NY 162 highlighted in red

Route information
- Maintained by NYSDOT
- Length: 14.04 mi (22.60 km)
- Existed: 1930–present

Major junctions
- South end: US 20 / NY 30A in Esperance
- North end: NY 5S in Root

Location
- Country: United States
- State: New York
- Counties: Schoharie, Montgomery

Highway system
- New York Highways; Interstate; US; State; Reference; Parkways
← NY 161	→ NY 163

New York State Route 162 (NY 162) is a state highway in eastern New York in the United States. It runs from an intersection with U.S. Route 20 (US 20) in the Schoharie County town of Esperance to an interchange with NY 5S in the Montgomery County town of Root, west of the village of Canajoharie. The southernmost 0.75 miles (1.21 km) of the route are concurrent with NY 30A, which continues south of NY 162's intersection with US 20. NY 162 is a two-lane highway for all of its length, although its final 1.25 miles (2.01 km) has a climbing lane southbound as it leaves the Mohawk Valley over the Sprakers Gorge. The route was assigned as part of the 1930 renumbering of state highways in New York and realigned slightly in the late 1960s to bypass an accident-prone stretch near its northern terminus.

== Route description ==
NY 162 begins at an intersection with US 20 and NY 30A in Sloansville, a hamlet within the town of Esperance. The route proceeds northward, overlapping with NY 30A as the two-lane highway passes through residential areas of the town. After leaving Sloansville, NY 162 and NY 30A turn northwestward into a Y intersection that marks the north end of the overlap. While NY 30A continues north, NY 162 bends northwest to a nearby junction with the western terminus of County Route 35 (CR 35, named Shun Pike Road). For a short distance from CR 35, NY 162 proceeds westward through Esperance, turning northwest at a junction with Sprakers Road. Now a two-lane rural roadway, the route enters the town of Carlisle, running near the base of Corbin Hill.

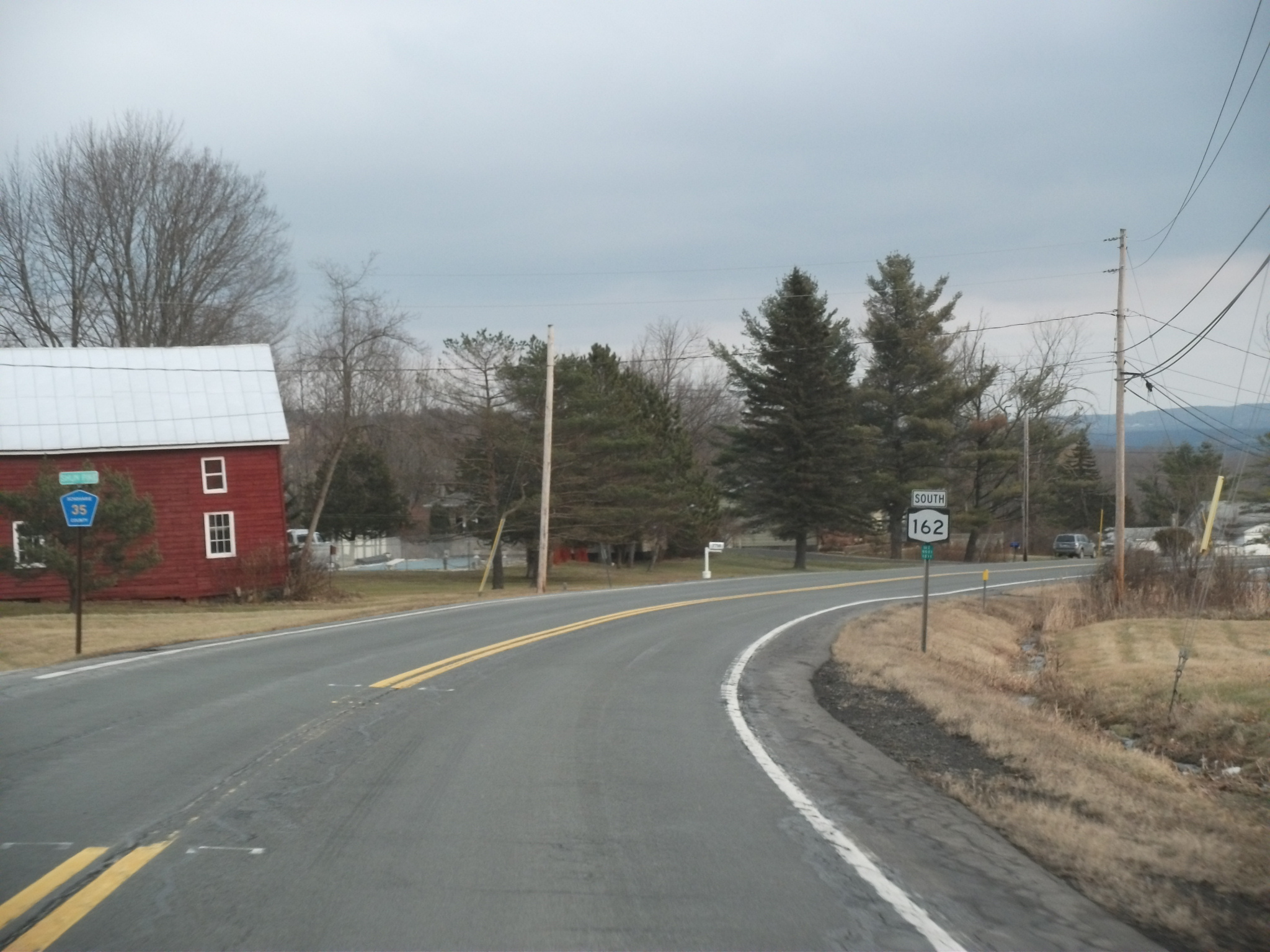
NY 162 southbound at the junction with CR 35 in Esperance

The highway continues northwest through Carlisle before crossing the line into Montgomery County from Schoharie County. After crossing into Montgomery County, NY 162 crosses into the town of Charleston, bending northwest through the town. The scenery in Charlestown does not change from where it was in Carlisle, as NY 162 remains a two-lane rural road. A short distance later, NY 162 enters the hamlet of Charleston Four Corners, where it intersects with Corbin Hill Road (CR 104), East Lykers Road (CR 103) and Charleston Street (CR 134). NY 162 continues northwest out of Charleston Four Corners, remaining a two-lane road as it crosses into the town of Root.

In Root, NY 162 intersects with South Green Road (CR 126), before turning north past several farmhouses. Bending northwest once again, NY 162 bypasses the hamlet of Rural Grove, intersecting with the southern and northern termini of Rural Grove Road (CR 125). Just to the northwest of Rural Grove, the route intersects with the northern terminus of Lynk Street (CR 99) before entering the rural hamlet of Currytown. In Currytown, there is a junction with Currytown Road (CR 105) while NY 162 passes several residences on both sides of the highway. At the western end of Currytown, the route intersects with Flat Creek Road (CR 98), where it turns northwest through the town of Root.

NY 162 continues northwest through Root, intersecting with Hilltop Road (CR 96) and Sprakers Hill Road (CR 108). Now with the moniker of Sloansville Road, NY 162 enters the hamlet of Sprakers, where it crosses a tributary of the Mohawk River. The route continues to the community's western edge, where NY 162 ends at an interchange with NY 5S just south of the New York State Thruway (I-90). NY 162 northbound merges with westbound NY 5S, and a U-turn lane just west of the merge also provides access to NY 5S east.

== History ==
The origins of NY 162 date back to the late 1900s when the section of the route north of Rural Grove was improved to state highway standards under a project contracted out on September 20, 1907. It was added to the state highway system on July 14, 1910, as unsigned State Highway 304 (SH 304). The remainder of the Sloansville–Sprakers highway was reconstructed c. 1930. In the 1930 renumbering of state highways in New York, hundreds of state-maintained highways were assigned a posted route number for the first time. One of these roads was the Sloansville–Sprakers state highway, which was designated NY 162. At its north end, NY 162 was originally routed on Sprakers Hill Road, a winding, hilly highway directly serving Sprakers. The design of the road left it prone to several accidents each year; additionally, the brakes of northbound tractor-trailers would often fail as drivers tried to descend the hill.

Various safety measures were implemented by the New York State Department of Public Works (NYSDPW) in response to the frequent accidents. Northbound truck drivers were forced to travel in low gear, and three runaway truck ramps were constructed at the tight curves along the highway for trucks whose brakes had failed. Additionally, the existing signage along the road was supplemented by new warning signs. More substantial changes to the road were suggested as early as March 1958 when several local grange halls petitioned then-Governor W. Averell Harriman to eliminate the curves altogether by straightening the road. In 1964, NYSDPW unveiled plans for a new bypass that would avoid the accident-prone route and meet NY 5S at an interchange west of Sprakers. The contract for the $2.4 million project (equivalent to $23.2 million in 2025) was let in January 1967, and the highway took about two years to construct. Sprakers Hill Road is now maintained by Montgomery County as CR 108.

== Major intersections ==
County	Location	mi	km	Destinations	Notes
Schoharie	Town of Esperance	0.00	0.00	US 20 / NY 30A south – Duanesburg, Sharon	Southern terminus; hamlet of Sloansville; southern terminus of NY 30A / NY 162 overlap
Schoharie	Town of Esperance	0.80	1.29	NY 30A north – Fultonville	Northern terminus of NY 30A / NY 162 overlap
Montgomery	Root	14.04	22.60	NY 5S to I-90 / New York Thruway – Fultonville, Canajoharie	Northern terminus; hamlet of Sprakers
1.000 mi = 1.609 km; 1.000 km = 0.621 mi: Concurrency terminus
