= Sammonsville, New York =

- Hamlet
- Location within the state of New York
- Coordinates: 42°59′18″N 74°26′00″W
- Country: United States
- State: New York
- County: Fulton
- Town: Johnstown
- Elevation: 472 ft (144 m)
- Time zone: UTC-5 (Eastern (EST))
  - Summer (DST): UTC-4 (EDT)
- Area code: 518

Sammonsville is a hamlet in the Town of Johnstown in Fulton County, New York, United States. It is located by the southern town line on New York State Route 334 (NY 334).
