= New York State Route 890 =

State highway in Schenectady County, New York, US

New York State Route 890
- Map of the Schenectady area with NY 890 highlighted in red

Route information
- Auxiliary route of I-890
- Maintained by NYSDOT
- Length: 1.00 mi (1.61 km)
- Existed: October 21, 1998–present

Major junctions
- West end: NY 5 in Glenville
- East end: I-90 Toll / New York Thruway / I-890 / NY 5S in Rotterdam

Location
- Country: United States
- State: New York
- Counties: Schenectady

Highway system
- New York Highways; Interstate; US; State; Reference; Parkways
| ← I-890 | → NY 895 |

New York State Route 890 (NY 890) is an unsigned 1.00-mile (1.61 km) freeway located northwest of downtown Schenectady in the Capital District of New York in the United States. Although the route runs north–south, it is signed as east–west to match the posted direction of Interstate 890 (I-890), of which NY 890 is an extension. The western terminus of the route is at an intersection with NY 5 in the town of Glenville, and its eastern terminus is at an interchange with I-890 in the town of Rotterdam, where NY 890 becomes I-890 and continues east into Downtown Schenectady.

The idea of a Rotterdam–Glenville connector across the Mohawk River was proposed as early as the 1960s. Parts of the right-of-way of NY 890, including the bridges carrying what is now NY 890 over the ramp leading from NY 890 west to NY 5S, were built as part of I-890's construction in 1973. Construction of the remainder of the route was delayed for decades due to a lack of funds. Work on the highway finally resumed in 1996, and the length of NY 890 was opened to traffic in October 1998.

== Route description ==
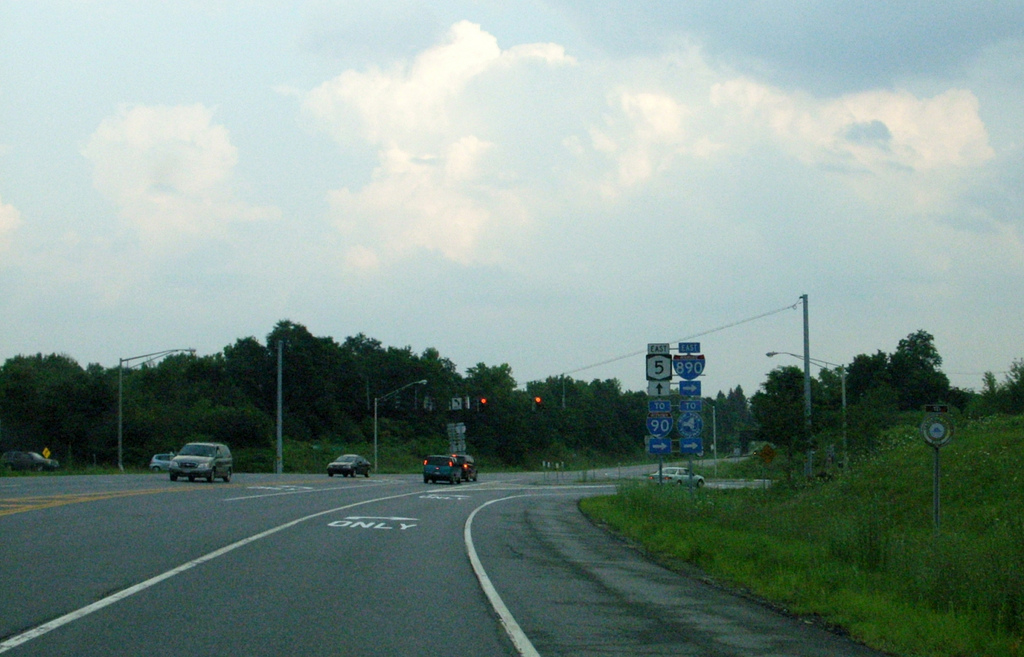
Western terminus of NY 890 at NY 5

NY 890 begins four miles (6 km) from downtown Schenectady at an at-grade intersection with NY 5 in the town of Glenville. The route heads south as a four-lane freeway, passing through a small open area in the otherwise developed town before passing under the Delaware and Hudson Railway. Another brief undeveloped stretch leads to the Mohawk River (Erie Canal), which the highway crosses to reach the town of Rotterdam. On the southern bank, NY 890 encounters the eastern terminus of NY 5S via exit 1A, a modified trumpet interchange built adjacent to a forested area bordering the river.

As the roadway crosses over a ramp leading from NY 890 westbound to NY 5S, it makes a turn to the southeast, bringing the highway closer to the banks of the river. NY 890 also widens to six lanes at this point to accommodate the road's upcoming junction with the New York State Thruway. The connection between the Thruway and NY 890 is made via I-890, which begins at Thruway exit 26 and merges with NY 890 at exit 1B, a modified trumpet interchange adjacent to the Thruway junction. NY 890 terminates at the south end of the trumpet interchange, and I-890 continues southeastward on NY 890's right-of-way along the Mohawk River toward downtown Schenectady.

NY 890 is not signed with signage along the route generally indicating that the roadway goes to I-890 and I-90 or to NY 5 and NY 5S.

== History ==
=== Origins and cancellation ===
Plans for a Mohawk River crossing between New York State Thruway exit 26 west of Schenectady and NY 5 in Glenville date as far back as 1967 when the town of Glenville developed a proposal to build a western bypass of the city of Schenectady. The highway, named "Alternate Route 50" or Route 50W, would run from the Thruway at exit 26, cross the Mohawk River, and ultimately head northeast to a terminus in Saratoga County. The crossing part of the proposal gained traction in 1973 when the final section of I-890 was built to accommodate a northward extension and a future exit with NY 5S near the riverbank. In the meantime, NY 5S was reconfigured to directly connect to the west end of I-890 while Thruway exit 26 was accessed by exiting the highway at modern exit 1B.

Most of the groundwork for the northern extension was put in place around this time. The connection with NY 5S utilized the right-of-way of what was intended to be a ramp for the riverside exit with NY 5S. Graded roadbeds were laid out for both directions of the extension up to the south bank of the Mohawk River, and the ground was graded for all of the proposed exit's ramps. A pair of bridges to carry the extension over the westbound ramp to NY 5S were also constructed, but unused at this point. No construction of any kind was present north of the river, even though the state of New York had purchased the road's right-of-way. Work on the highway came to a halt in 1976 when the state cancelled the project to shift funds to other projects, including the construction of bridges carrying NY 5 and Freemans Bridge Road over the Mohawk River in downtown Schenectady.

=== Revival and construction ===
The project idled until 1983 when state voters approved "Rebuild New York", a $1.25 billion bond issue to improve the state's transportation infrastructure. A study of the crossing project began in March 1985 using $800,000 in funds from Rebuild New York and continued through December 1986. The General Contractor was Reicker Construction for the update. L-Tech Coatings, Inc. was the final painting contractor to finish the bridge in December 1986. It was finally completed by March 1988. Even through the preliminary study was complete, the state still lacked the funds needed to construct the road. Projections made in 1986 put the cost of the highway at $20 million. The delay in constructing the highway led to increases in the estimated final price tag, which climbed to $34 million by 1990 and $40 million by 1994.

In 1995, the New York State Department of Transportation (NYSDOT) finally made plans to construct the highway, now projected to cost $52 million as originally designed. A total of $24.1 million had been set aside for the road by this point—$13.3 million from the federal government and a combined $10.8 million from the state and the New York State Thruway Authority—leading NYSDOT to consider making changes to the road's design in an effort to cut the project's cost. In 1996, two contracts to construct the Mohawk River bridge and its southern approach were awarded for just $22.5 million. The latter contract, valued at just under $7.5 million, would build ramps and highways on the right-of-ways that had graded and leveled years before, as well as rehabilitate and widen three previously unused bridges, including the two installed along the extension's alignment.

Work on the highway began in October 1996, almost 25 years after the completion of I-890 and 40 years since work began on the graded roadbeds on the southern riverbank. Ground was broken on the Mohawk River bridge in May 1997. The highway was completed in October 1998 and opened to traffic at 3 p.m. on October 21, 1998, following a ribbon-cutting ceremony. It was designated as NY 890 at this time, becoming one of several state routes to serve as an extension of a like-numbered Interstate Highway.

== Exit list ==
The entire route is in Schenectady County.

| Location | mi | km | Exit | Destinations | Notes |
|---|---|---|---|---|---|
| Glenville | 0.00 | 0.00 | – | NY 5 – Amsterdam, Scotia | Western terminus; at-grade intersection |
| Town of Rotterdam | 1.00 | 1.61 | 1 | I-90 Toll / New York Thruway / NY 5S west – Rotterdam Junction | Signed as exits 1A (NY 5S) and 1B (I-90); eastern terminus of NY 5S; exit 26 on I-90 / Thruway |
| Town of Rotterdam | 1.00 | 1.61 | – | I-890 east – Schenectady | Continuation east |
1.000 mi = 1.609 km; 1.000 km = 0.621 mi
