= Esperance, New York =

- Town
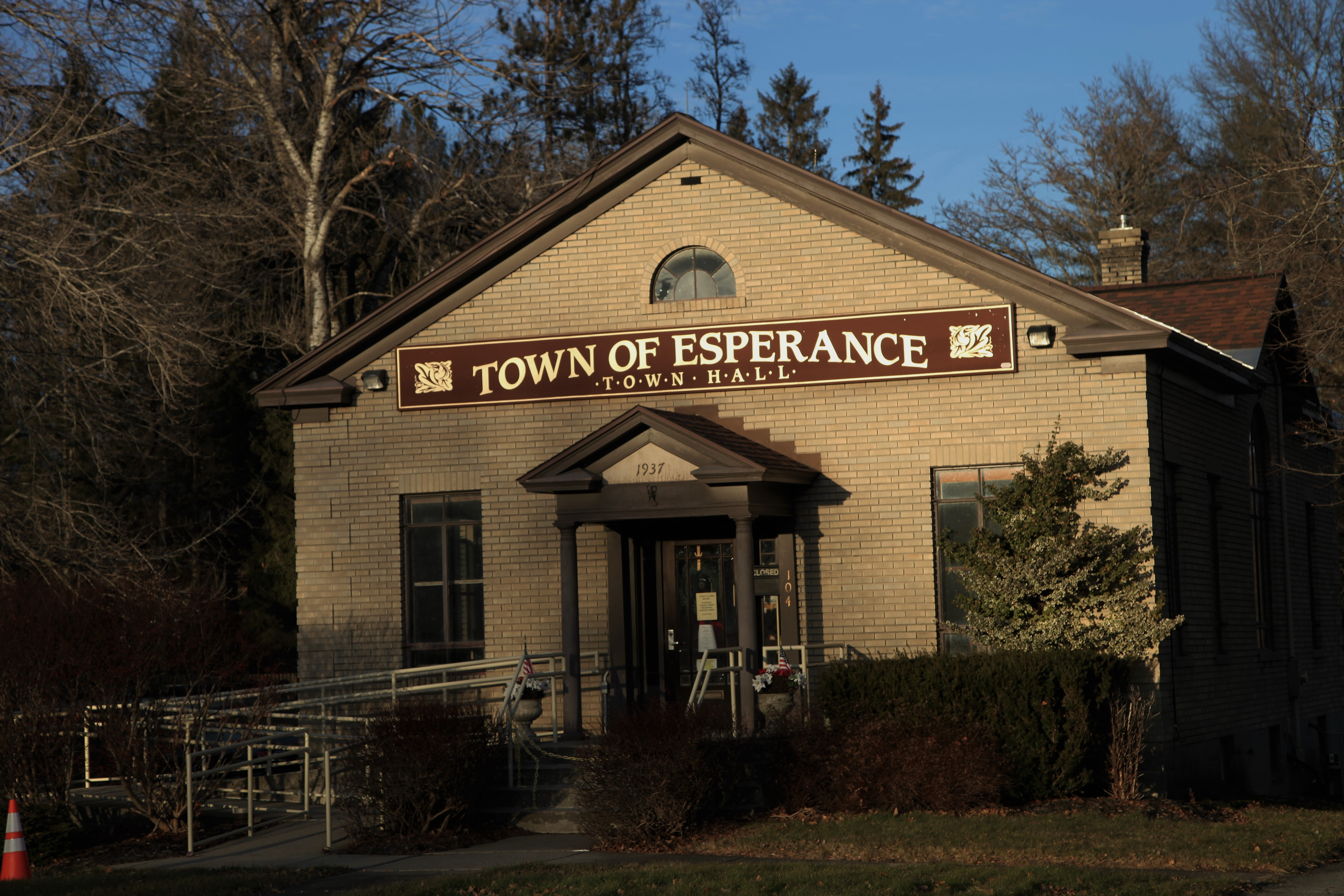
- Town hall

- Location in Schoharie County and the state of New York.
- Coordinates: 42°44′50″N 74°18′19″W
- Country: United States
- State: New York
- County: Schoharie

Government
  - Supervisor: Earl Van Wormer III

Area
  - Total: 20.04 sq mi (51.90 km^{2})
  - Land: 19.67 sq mi (50.94 km^{2})
  - Water: 0.37 sq mi (0.96 km^{2})

Population (2020)
  - Total: 1,806
- Time zone: UTC-5 (Eastern (EST))
  - Summer (DST): UTC-4 (EDT)
- FIPS code: 36-24724
- GNIS feature ID: 0978945
- Website: Town website

Esperance is a town in Schoharie County, New York, United States. The population was 1,806 at the 2020 census. The town was given the name of the principal village, which was named for "hope" in French.

The Town of Esperance contains a village called Esperance. The town is in the northeastern part of Schoharie County and is west of Schenectady.

== History ==
The town was first settled circa 1729.

Esperance village was incorporated in 1818 and rechartered in 1835, before the Town of Esperance was established.

The town was formed in 1846 from the Town of Schoharie.

== Geography ==
According to the United States Census Bureau, the town has a total area of 20.0 square miles (51.9 km^{2}), of which 19.6 square miles (50.7 km^{2}) is land and 0.5 square mile (1.2 km^{2}) (2.29%) is water.

The eastern town line, partly marked by the Schoharie Creek, is the border of Schenectady County, and the northern town boundary is the border of Montgomery County. Cripplebush Creek flows into Schoharie Creek, south of Sloansville.

U.S. Route 20 is an east-west highway through the town. New York State Route 30A is a north-south highway, intersecting US-20 at Sloansville. New York State Route 162 intersects NY-30A near Dwelly Corners.

== Demographics ==
Historical population
Census	Pop.	Note	%±
1850	1,428		—
1860	1,409		−1.3%
1870	1,276		−9.4%
1880	1,378		8.0%
1890	1,232		−10.6%
1900	1,096		−11.0%
1910	977		−10.9%
1920	890		−8.9%
1930	881		−1.0%
1940	887		0.7%
1950	1,128		27.2%
1960	1,232		9.2%
1970	1,567		27.2%
1980	1,951		24.5%
1990	2,101		7.7%
2000	2,043		−2.8%
2010	2,076		1.6%
2020	1,806		−13.0%
U.S. Decennial Census

As of the census of 2000, there were 2,043 people, 776 households, and 571 families residing in the town. The population density was 104.3 inhabitants per square mile (40.3/km^{2}). There were 856 housing units at an average density of 43.7 per square mile (16.9/km^{2}). The racial makeup of the town was 98.14% White, 0.34% Black or African American, 0.15% Native American, 0.39% Asian, 0.05% from other races, and 0.93% from two or more races. Hispanic or Latino of any race were 0.83% of the population.

There were 776 households, out of which 35.2% had children under the age of 18 living with them, 59.1% were married couples living together, 9.5% had a female householder with no husband present, and 26.3% were non-families. 20.2% of all households were made up of individuals, and 7.7% had someone living alone who was 65 years of age or older. The average household size was 2.63 and the average family size was 3.01.

In the town, the population was spread out, with 26.3% under the age of 18, 7.8% from 18 to 24, 29.3% from 25 to 44, 25.0% from 45 to 64, and 11.6% who were 65 years of age or older. The median age was 38 years. For every 100 females, there were 105.9 males. For every 100 females age 18 and over, there were 103.2 males.

The median income for a household in the town was $42,930, and the median income for a family was $46,940. Males had a median income of $32,331 versus $24,115 for females. The per capita income for the town was $17,574. About 4.8% of families and 7.4% of the population were below the poverty line, including 7.0% of those under age 18 and 8.0% of those age 65 or over.

== Communities and locations ==
- Central Bridge – A hamlet at the southern town line on NY-30A, mostly in the neighboring town of Schoharie.
- Dwelly Corners – A hamlet north of Sloansville on County Road 35.
- Esperance – The Village of Esperance is at the eastern town boundary on US-20, by the Schoharie Creek.
- Rockwell Corners – A location at the northern town line on County Road 44.
- Schoharie Junction – A hamlet in the southern part of the town on County Road 70.
- Sloansville – A hamlet west of Esperance village on US-20 at NY-30A. It was settled circa 1756.

== Points of interest ==
- George Landis Arboretum
- Esperance Museum & Historical Society
