= New York State Route 5S =

Highway in New York

New York State Route 5S
- NY 5S highlighted in red

Route information
- Auxiliary route of NY 5
- Maintained by NYSDOT and the village of Canajoharie
- Length: 72.92 mi (117.35 km)
- Existed: 1930–present

Major junctions
- West end: I-790 / NY 5 / NY 5A / NY 8 / NY 12 in Utica
- I-90 / New York Thruway / NY 28 in Mohawk; NY 169 in Danube; NY 80 in Fort Plain; I-90 / New York Thruway in Canajoharie; NY 30A in Fultonville; I-90 / New York Thruway / NY 30 near Amsterdam
- East end: I-90 / New York Thruway / I-890 / NY 890 in Rotterdam

Location
- Country: United States
- State: New York
- Counties: Oneida, Herkimer, Montgomery, Schenectady

Highway system
- New York Highways; Interstate; US; State; Reference; Parkways
| ← NY 5B | → US 6 |

New York State Route 5S (NY 5S) is a 72.92-mile-long (117.35 km) east–west state highway located in the Mohawk Valley of New York in the United States. It extends from a continuation of NY 5A at an interchange with I-790, NY 5, NY 8, and NY 12 in Utica to an interchange with I-890 and NY 890 in Rotterdam. The route runs along the south side of the Mohawk River for its entire length and parallels NY 5, which runs along the north side of the Mohawk River (hence the "S" in the route number of NY 5S). NY 5S intersects several primary routes including NY 28 in Mohawk, NY 30A in Fultonville, NY 30 south of Amsterdam, as well as intersecting the New York State Thruway (I-90) several times. The route is part of New York State Bicycle Route 5 west of its junction with NY 103 in Schenectady County.

In 1924, the portion of modern NY 5S between Utica and Mohawk was designated as the northernmost portion of NY 28, which connected Oneonta to Utica. When NY 5S was assigned in 1930, the route stretched from Oneida in the west to Schenectady in the east, absorbing the old section of NY 28. It was later truncated on both ends to eliminate overlaps with other state routes and to accommodate the construction of other roadways, most notably I-890 in western Schenectady. In some locations, NY 5S has been upgraded into a super two or an expressway, mostly in Utica and western Herkimer County.

== Route description ==
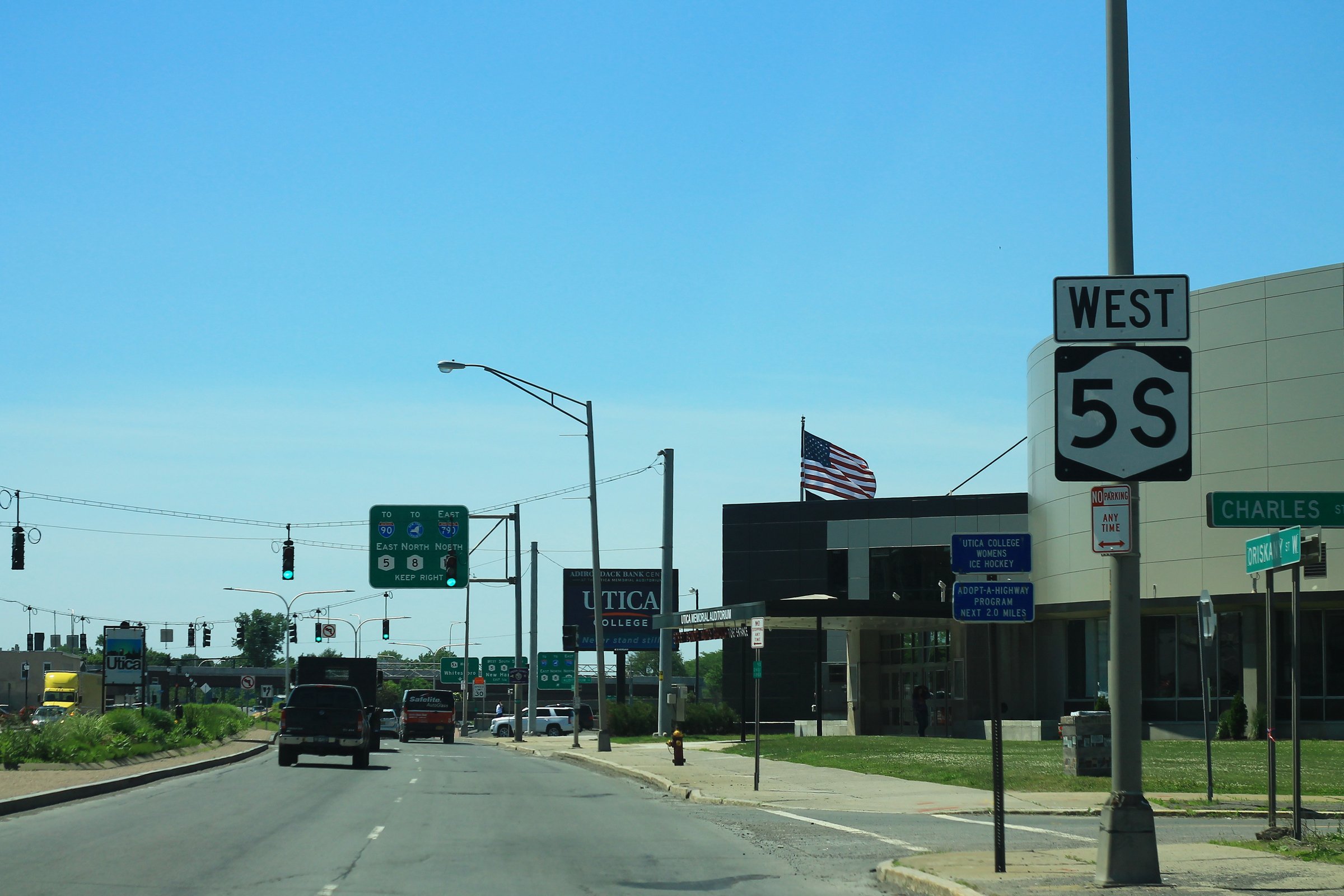
NY 5S westbound approaching its western terminus

NY 5S begins at an interchange with I-790 in downtown Utica, where Oriskany Street changes designations from NY 5A to NY 5S. At this interchange, I-790 is concurrent with NY 5, NY 8, and NY 12 along Utica's North–South Arterial. The freeway connects NY 5S to the New York State Thruway. From this interchange, NY 5S travels east across Utica as an urban arterial roadway with at grade intersections. First a signalized intersection with Genesee Street (NY 921C, an unsigned reference route) and a roundabout with John Street (unsigned NY 921P). After it crosses Broad Street, it continues east as a limited-access highway with grade-separated intersections to the Herkimer County line.

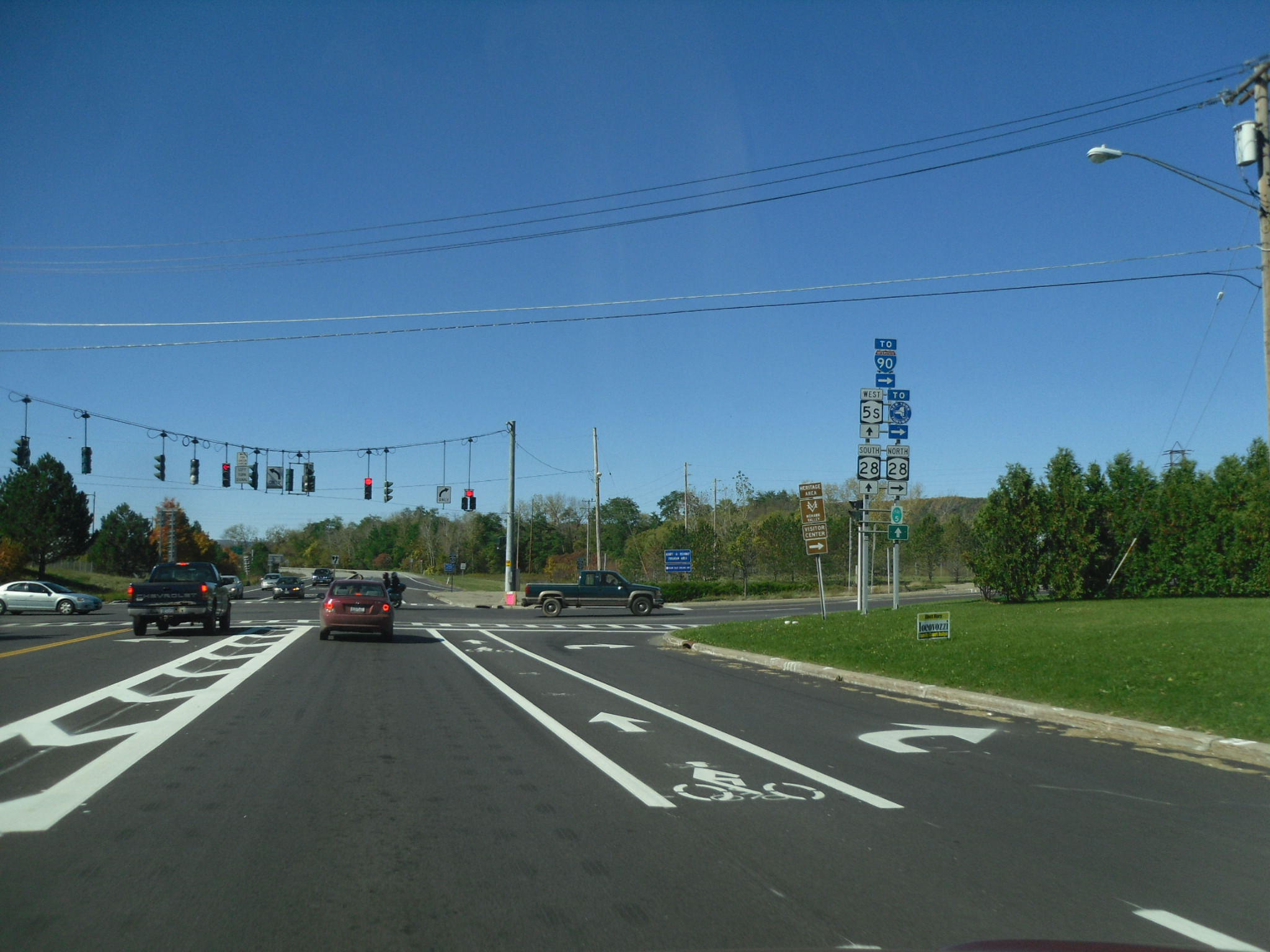
NY 5S westbound at east end of overlap with NY 28

The highway meets a trumpet interchange with Culver Avenue. Roughly 0.6 miles (0.97 km) east from here, is an interchange for Turner Street, a small connector road on the boundary of Oneida County and Herkimer County. NY 5S enters West Frankfort and has an exit for Dyke Road, which connects to the Thruway and NY 5. In West Frankfort, it parallels one of its many old alignments. NY 5S continues southward, encountering a diamond interchange with Higby Road and Cemetery Street in Frankfort. Just past the Herkimer County Fairgrounds, NY 5S crosses under NY 171, the latter of which it does not connect to. In East Frankfort, NY 5S intersects with its old routing and turns to the east. NY 5S enters Ilion, where it meets a partial cloverleaf interchange with NY 51. NY 5S passes to the south of Herkimer and has junctions with local roads before intersecting and briefly overlapping NY 28 in Mohawk. While in Mohawk, NY 5S also intersects with South Washington Street (unsigned NY 922B).

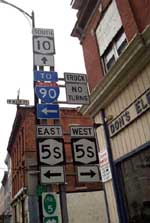
NY 5S and NY 10 signs in Canajoharie

Past Mohawk, NY 5S begins to parallel the Mohawk River and the Thruway as it continues eastward. NY 5S enters the town of Little Falls, and has a brief 0.05 miles (0.080 km) overlap with NY 167, and then begins to climb Fall Hill. At the other side of the hill, the highway intersects the southern terminus of NY 169, which connects NY 5S with exit 29A on the Thruway. From here, NY 5S passes through farmlands and parallels the Thruway even farther before reaching the village of Fort Plain, where it has a brief overlap with NY 80. From NY 80, NY 5S continues east, paralleling the Thruway, before intersecting NY 10 in the village of Canajoharie. In the latter, NY 5S is village-maintained in the immediate vicinity of its junction with NY 10. This 0.19-mile (0.31 km) stretch is the only part of the route that is not maintained by the New York State Department of Transportation (NYSDOT). Shortly past NY 10, the highway intersects exit 29 of the Thruway. From here, the highway continues east for roughly two miles (3.2 km) before intersecting the northern terminus of NY 162 in the town of Root.

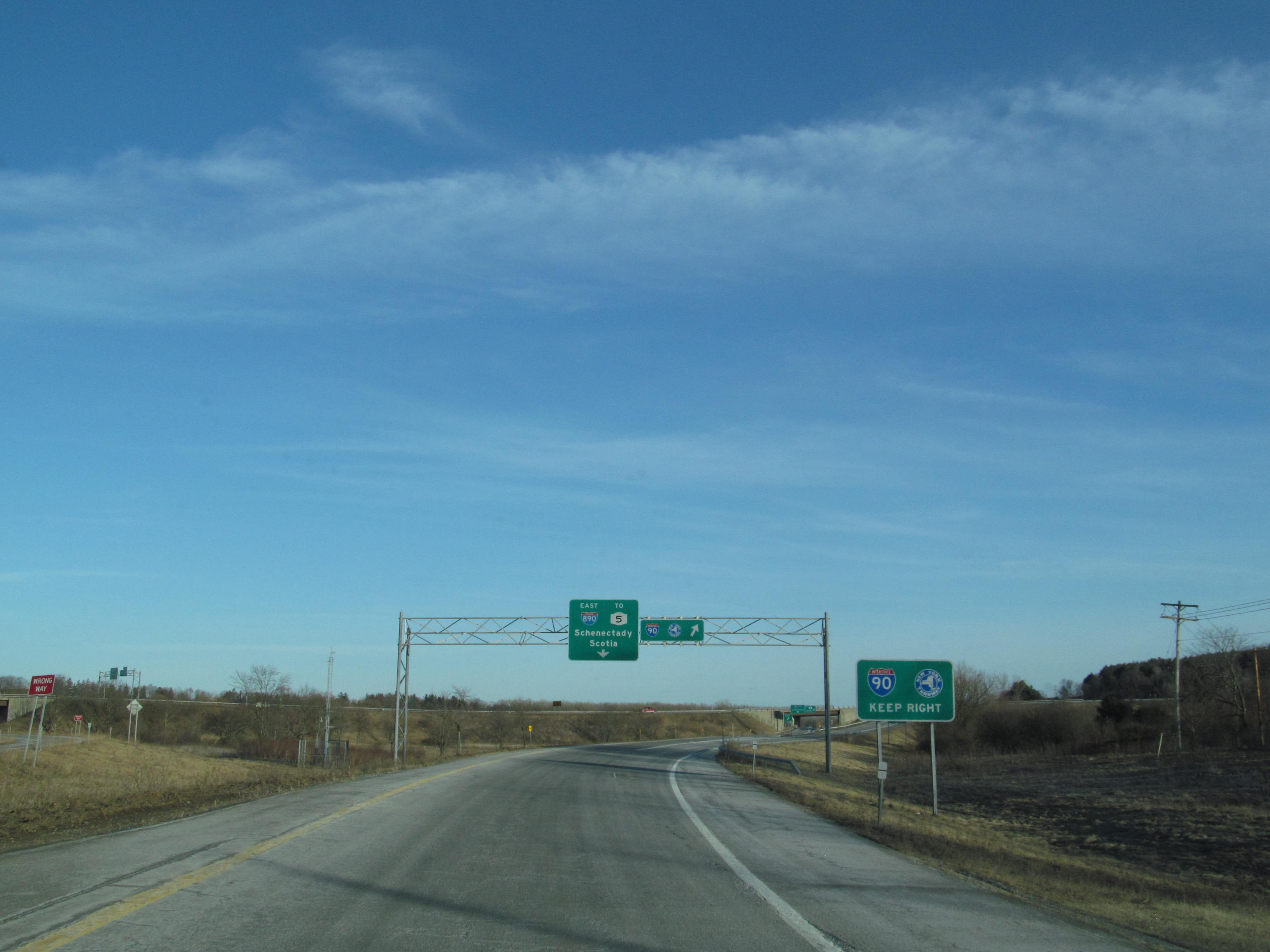
NY 5S approaching its eastern terminus

NY 5S enters Fultonville, and intersects with NY 30A, which connects NY 5S with exit 28 on the Thruway. From NY 30A, NY 5S continues east for just over two miles (3.2 km) to an intersection with Riverside Drive (unsigned NY 920P), which also leads to exit 28 on the Thruway. From here, it continues east for a short distance and intersects Noeltner Road, which was the northern terminus of former NY 288. About one mile (1.6 km) past Noeltner Road, it crosses to the north side of the Thruway, where it stays until its eastern terminus. NY 5S continues east then enters the City of Amsterdam and intersects with NY 30, which connects NY 5S with downtown Amsterdam and exit 27 on the Thruway. Past NY 30, it continues for about one mile (1.6 km) into the town of Florida, where it intersects Thayer Road, which was the former western terminus of NY 160. From here, NY 5S continues along the south side of the Mohawk River for roughly five miles (8.0 km), then crosses into Schenectady County. Just past the county line, it intersects the northern terminus of NY 160 (Scotch Church Road). NY 5S continues eastward through the town of Rotterdam for just over two miles (3.2 km), then intersects the southern terminus of NY 103 (Bridge Street). The highway continues east from here for just over three miles (4.8 km), before ending at an interchange with NY 890, which connects to I-890 and the Thruway in the town of Rotterdam.

== History ==
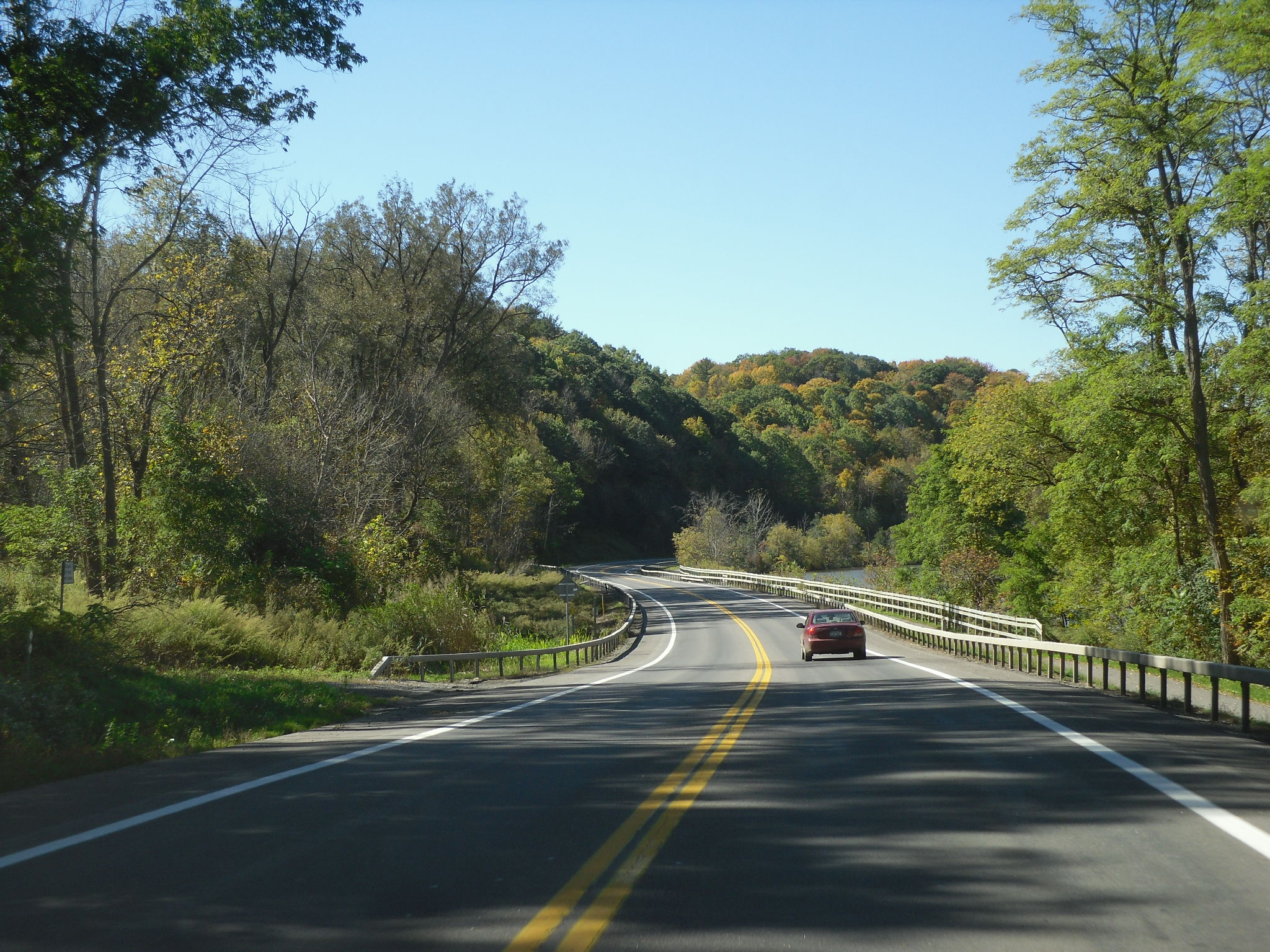
NY 5S westbound between NY 28 and South Washington Street

In 1908, the New York State Legislature created Route 6, an unsigned legislative route that began in Buffalo and proceeded eastward across New York to Albany. From Utica to Schenectady, Route 6 followed the banks of the Mohawk River through the Mohawk Valley. Initially, Route 6 used the modern NY 5S corridor from Utica to Mohawk and from Fultonville to Amsterdam. By 1920, the piece of what is now NY 5S from Mohawk to Little Falls became part of Route 26. On March 1, 1921, Route 26 was truncated to begin in Little Falls while Route 6 was realigned between Fultonville and Amsterdam to use NY 5 instead. When the first set of posted routes in New York were assigned in 1924, the portion of legislative Route 6 between Utica and Mohawk was designated as the northernmost portion of NY 28, a north–south route connecting Oneonta to Utica via Springfield and Richfield Springs.

In the 1930 renumbering of state highways in New York, NY 28 was rerouted north of Mohawk to follow its modern alignment toward Poland. Its former routing between Utica and Mohawk became part of NY 5S, an alternate route of NY 5 between Oneida and Schenectady. As its suffix implies, NY 5S was mostly a southerly alternate route of NY 5; however, it actually followed a more northerly routing than NY 5 west of Utica. It continued west to Oneida on what is now NY 5A, NY 69, NY 365, and NY 365A and east into Schenectady along Rice and River Roads. NY 5S was truncated eastward to Utica in the early 1940s, placing all of NY 5S south of NY 5 for the first time.

On its eastern end, NY 5S was gradually truncated to its current terminus in Rotterdam as portions of I-890 was built over the former routing of NY 5S between Rotterdam and Schenectady. The first cutback occurred in the early 1970s following the completion of I-890 between downtown Schenectady and exit 4. The freeway was completed between the New York State Thruway (I-90) and Schenectady in the mid-1970s, resulting in the truncation of NY 5S to I-890 exit 2. It was truncated to its current eastern terminus at I-890 (now NY 890) in the late 1980s after a reconfiguration of the interchange between the Thruway and I-890 resulted in the removal of River Road between I-890 and the current stub end of Rice Road. Work on the interchange at the eastern terminus began in October 1996, on a project to build a new roadway north across the Mohawk River to NY 5. The highway was completed in October 1998 and opened to traffic on October 21, 1998. It was designated as NY 890, an extension of a I-890.

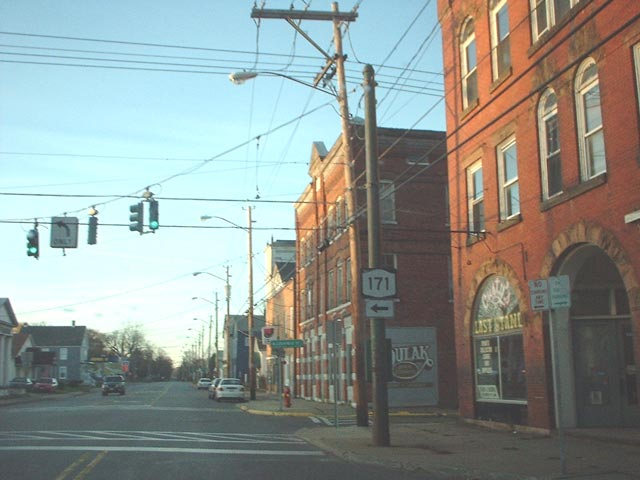
Old NY 5S at NY 171 in Frankfort

From Utica to Mohawk, NY 5S was originally routed on "Old Route 5S" and Main Street. It was realigned in the early 1970s to follow a new freeway between Utica and Old Route 5S in Ilion that bypassed Frankfort to the west. A super two extension of the freeway east to Mohawk was started sometime after 1982 and finished by the mid-1990s. On April 5, 1987, the bridge carrying the New York State Thruway over Schoharie Creek collapsed. At the time, the creek was higher and flowing faster than normal due to excessive rains in the area. The segment of NY 5S near Fort Hunter was reconfigured to carry westbound Thruway traffic while the bridge was rebuilt. The eastbound replacement bridge was completed and fully open to traffic on December 7, 1987, and the westbound replacement bridge was opened on May 21, 1988.

In 2018, an $18 million project began to improve the NY 5S corridor within Utica. On December 15, 2020, the roundabout opened at the intersection with John Street (NY 921P). One of reasons for the roundabout at John Street is to eliminate the large amount of accidents, caused from drivers making illegal left turns onto John Street. Jay Street, which ran parallel along NY 5S was eliminated between Genesee Street and 2nd Street. The intersection with Genesee Street (NY 921C) was proposed to be converted to be a roundabout, but was found to not be feasible. Instead the traffic signal was improved so drivers could make all left turns that were previously prohibited.

=== Memorial designation ===
On July 24, 2019, Governor Andrew Cuomo signed into law that a portion of NY 5S was to be designated the "Sergeant Jeremy J. Van Nostrand Memorial Highway" in the town of Glen. Trooper Jeremy Van Nostrand was killed as he was arriving to work. His car was rear ended and pushed into the path of an oncoming truck. The signs were unveiled and the dedication ceremony was held on November 27, 2019.

== Major intersections ==
| County | Location | mi | km | Destinations | Notes |
|---|---|---|---|---|---|
| Oneida | Utica | 0.00 | 0.00 | NY 5A west – Whitesboro | Continuation west |
| Oneida | Utica | 0.00 | 0.00 | I-790 east / NY 5 / NY 8 / NY 12 to I-90 / New York Thruway – New Hartford | Interchange; western terminus of I-790 |
| Oneida | Utica | 0.56 | 0.90 | Genesee Street (NY 921C north) to I-90 / New York Thruway | Former routing of NY 5 / NY 8 / NY 12; southern terminus of NY 921C |
| Oneida | Utica | 0.71 | 1.14 | John Street (NY 921P north) to I-90 / New York Thruway | Southern terminus of NY 921P; roundabout |
| Herkimer | Town of Frankfort | 9.33 | 15.02 | Cemetery Street to NY 171 – Frankfort via Cemetery Street | Interchange |
| Herkimer | Ilion | 11.6 | 18.7 | West Main Street – Ilion | Interchange |
| Herkimer | Ilion | 12.75 | 20.52 | NY 51 (Central Avenue) to NY 5 – Ilion | Interchange |
| Herkimer | Mohawk | 14.43 | 23.22 | NY 28 south (Warren Street) – Mohawk, Richfield Springs | Western terminus of NY 28 overlap |
| Herkimer | Mohawk | 14.72 | 23.69 | NY 28 north (East Main Street) to I-90 / New York Thruway – Herkimer | Eastern terminus of NY 28 overlap |
| Herkimer | German Flatts | 15.62 | 25.14 | South Washington Street (NY 922B north) – Herkimer | Southern terminus of NY 922B |
| Herkimer | Town of Little Falls | 20.77 | 33.43 | NY 167 north – Little Falls | Western terminus of NY 167 overlap |
| Herkimer | Town of Little Falls | 20.82 | 33.51 | NY 167 south – Richfield Springs | Eastern terminus of NY 167 overlap |
| Herkimer | Danube | 23.89 | 38.45 | NY 169 north to I-90 / New York Thruway – Little Falls | Southern terminus of NY 169 |
| Montgomery | Fort Plain | 36.10 | 58.10 | NY 80 south (Main Street) / NY 163 east – Cooperstown | Western terminus of NY 80 overlap; western terminus of NY 163 |
| Montgomery | Fort Plain | 36.12 | 58.13 | NY 80 north (Main Street) to NY 5 | Eastern terminus of NY 80 overlap |
| Montgomery | Village of Canajoharie | 39.46 | 63.50 | NY 10 (Church Street) to NY 5 | |
| Montgomery | Village of Canajoharie | 39.70 | 63.89 | I-90 / New York Thruway | Exit 29 (I-90 / Thruway) |
| Montgomery | Root | 42.12 | 67.79 | NY 162 south – Sloansville | Northern terminus of NY 162 |
| Montgomery | Fultonville | 51.39 | 82.70 | NY 30A (South Main Street) to I-90 / New York Thruway / NY 5 – Fonda, Glen | |
| Montgomery | Glen | 53.45 | 86.02 | Riverside Drive (NY 920P west) to I-90 / New York Thruway | Eastern terminus of NY 920P |
| Montgomery | Glen | | | CR 164 south (Noeltner Road) | Former northern terminus of NY 288 |
| Montgomery | City of Amsterdam | 60.89 | 97.99 | I-90 / New York Thruway / NY 30 (North–South Arterial) to NY 5 – Amsterdam, Minaville, Speculator | Interchange |
| Montgomery | Florida | 61.87 | 99.57 | CR 165 east (Thayer Road) | Former western terminus of NY 160 |
| Schenectady | Town of Rotterdam | 67.51 | 108.65 | NY 160 south (Scotch Church Road) – Mariaville | Hamlet of Pattersonville; northern terminus of NY 160 |
| Schenectady | Town of Rotterdam | 69.71 | 112.19 | NY 103 north (Bridge Street) to NY 5 – Scotia | Southern terminus of NY 103 |
| Schenectady | Town of Rotterdam | 72.64 | 116.90 | I-90 / New York Thruway – Albany, Buffalo | Eastbound exit and westbound entrance; exit 26 (I-90 / Thruway) |
| Schenectady | Town of Rotterdam | 72.92 | 117.35 | I-890 east to NY 5 – Schenectady, Scotia | Interchange; eastern terminus; access to NY 5 via NY 890; exit 1A (I-890) |
1.000 mi = 1.609 km; 1.000 km = 0.621 mi: Concurrency terminus; Electronic toll collection; Incomplete access

== See also ==
- List of county routes in Schenectady County, New York
