= Esperance (village), New York =

Esperance, New York
- Village
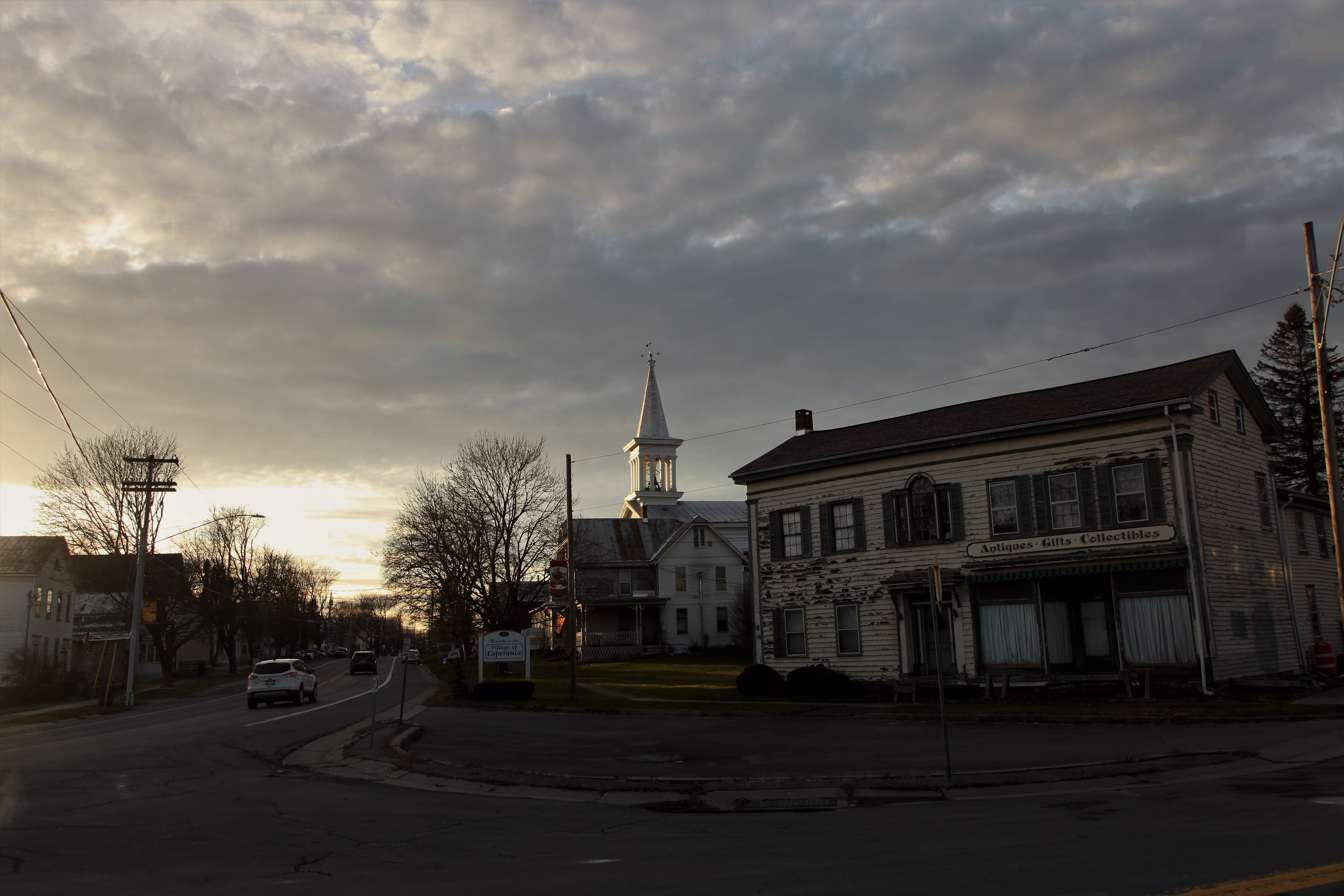
- The corner of Main Street and Charleston Street in the village of Esperance, New York.

- Location within the state of New York
- Coordinates: 42°45′44″N 74°15′34″W
- Country: United States
- State: New York
- County: Schoharie

Area
  - Total: 0.52 sq mi (1.35 km^{2})
  - Land: 0.49 sq mi (1.27 km^{2})
  - Water: 0.031 sq mi (0.08 km^{2})
- Elevation: 581 ft (177 m)

Population (2020)
  - Total: 346
  - Density: 710/sq mi (273/km^{2})
- Time zone: UTC-5 (Eastern (EST))
  - Summer (DST): UTC-4 (EDT)
- FIPS code: 36-24713
- GNIS feature ID: 0949711
- Website: www.schohariecounty-ny.gov/CountyWebSite/villesp/index.jsp

Esperance is a village in Schoharie County, New York, United States. The population was 345 at the 2010 census. The village was given the French name for "hope."

The Village of Esperance is in eastern part of the Town of Esperance. The village is west of Schenectady.

== History ==
The village was settled circa 1793, based on an original land grant, the Ten Eyck Patent of 1769.

The village was incorporated in 1818 and a fire department was authorized to be formed. The village is the oldest incorporated village in the county. When the town of Esperance was formed in 1846, it thereupon took the name of the village.

== Geography ==
Esperance is located at 42°45′44″N 74°15′33″W (42.762271, -74.259361).

According to the United States Census Bureau, the village has a total area of 0.5 square miles (1.3 km^{2}), of which 0.5 square miles (1.3 km^{2}) is land and 0.04 square miles (0.10 km^{2}) (5.66%) is water.

The village is adjacent to the Schoharie Creek and is located on U.S. Route 20 at the junction of County Roads 28 and 44.

== Demographics ==
Historical population
Census	Pop.	Note	%±
1880	341		—
1890	274		−19.6%
1900	290		5.8%
1910	263		−9.3%
1920	219		−16.7%
1930	233		6.4%
1940	219		−6.0%
1950	322		47.0%
1960	314		−2.5%
1970	408		29.9%
1980	374		−8.3%
1990	324		−13.4%
2000	380		17.3%
2010	345		−9.2%
2020	346		0.3%
U.S. Decennial Census

Presbyterian Church Historical Marker

As of the census of 2000, there were 380 people, 149 households, and 106 families residing in the village. The population density was 757.7 inhabitants per square mile (292.5/km^{2}). There were 158 housing units at an average density of 315.1 units per square mile (121.7 units/km^{2}). The racial makeup of the village was 96.84% White, 1.58% Black or African American, 1.05% Asian, and 0.53% from two or more races. Hispanic or Latino of any race were 0.26% of the population.

There were 149 households, out of which 34.9% had children under the age of 18 living with them, 56.4% were married couples living together, 11.4% had a female householder with no husband present, and 28.2% were non-families. 21.5% of all households were made up of individuals, and 8.1% had someone living alone who was 65 years of age or older. The average household size was 2.55 and the average family size was 3.00.

In the village, the population was spread out, with 24.5% under the age of 18, 7.1% from 18 to 24, 30.3% from 25 to 44, 25.0% from 45 to 64, and 13.2% who were 65 years of age or older. The median age was 40 years. For every 100 females, there were 102.1 males. For every 100 females age 18 and over, there were 92.6 males.

The median income for a household in the village was $46,875, and the median income for a family was $49,375. Males had a median income of $37,000 versus $26,042 for females. The per capita income for the village was $17,985. About 3.7% of families and 3.9% of the population were below the poverty line, including 2.1% of those under age 18 and 7.4% of those age 65 or over.

== Points of interest ==
- George Landis Arboretum, located north of the village.
