= Amsterdam (town), New York =

Amsterdam, New York
- Town
- Location within Montgomery County and the state of New York
- Coordinates: 42°57′21″N 74°11′08″W
- Country: United States
- State: New York
- County: Montgomery

Government
  - Type: Town council
  - Town supervisor: Thomas P. DiMezza (R)
  - Town council: Members: • Kenneth J. Krutz (D); • Terry A. Bieniek (D); • Bart A. Tessiero (D); • Alexander S. Kuchis (R)

Area
  - Total: 30.37 sq mi (78.67 km^{2})
  - Land: 29.64 sq mi (76.77 km^{2})
  - Water: 0.73 sq mi (1.90 km^{2})
- Elevation: 666 ft (203 m)

Population (2020)
  - Total: 5,557
  - Density: 187.5/sq mi (72.4/km^{2})
- Time zone: UTC−05 (Eastern (EST))
  - Summer (DST): UTC−04 (EDT)
- ZIP Codes: 12010 (Amsterdam); 12070 (Fort Johnson); 12086 (Hagaman); 12068 (Fonda); 12095 (Johnstown); 12177 (Tribes Hill)
- Area code: 518
- FIPS code: 36-057-02077
- GNIS feature ID: 0978678
- Website: www.townofamsterdam.org

Amsterdam is a town in Montgomery County, New York, United States. It is located approximately 35 miles northwest of Albany, the state capital. The population was 5,557 at the 2020 census. The town is named after Amsterdam, the capital of the Netherlands.

The town is adjacent to the city of Amsterdam. The Mohawk River, which is part of the Erie Canal, passes along the southern border of the town.

== History ==
The region was controlled by the powerful Iroquois confederacy's member tribe, the Mohawk, prior to the entry of Europeans into the area.

The town was first settled around 1715, but most settlement did not take place until Sir William Johnson established his first seat of power in the region at Fort Johnson (earlier known as Mount Johnson), prior to founding the city of Johnstown.

The town was formed in 1793 from part of the town of Caughnawaga.

The village of Amsterdam was incorporated in 1838 in the south part of the town. As the village grew toward becoming the city of Amsterdam, it took in more territory inside the town. The town of Perth (also in Fulton County) was removed in 1838.

In 1865, the population of Amsterdam was 5,135.

The Hurricana Stock Farm and Samuel and Johanna Jones Farm are listed on the National Register of Historic Places.

== Geography ==
Amsterdam is in the northeast corner of Montgomery County. The northern town line is the border of Fulton County, and the eastern town line is the border with Saratoga and Schenectady counties. The southern town boundary is defined by the Mohawk River, except for the center portion of the boundary, which is with the city of Amsterdam, and the western town boundary is with the town of Mohawk.

According to the U.S. Census Bureau, the town of Amsterdam has a total area of 30.37 square miles (78.7 km^{2}), of which 29.64 square miles (76.8 km^{2}) are land and 0.73 square miles (1.89 km^{2}), or 2.41%, are water. Tributaries of the Mohawk River which flow through the town include Kayaderosseras Creek in the west, North Chuctanunda Creek in the center, and Degraff Creek and Evas Kill in the east.

New York State Route 5 and New York State Route 67 are east–west highways, partly conjoined near the Mohawk River. Both highways intersect north–south New York State Route 30 in the city of Amsterdam. NY-5 leads southeast to Schenectady and west to Fonda, NY-67 leads east to Ballston Spa, and NY-30 leads north to Mayfield and south to Schoharie.

== Demographics ==
Historical population
Census	Pop.	Note	%±
1820	3,171		—
1830	3,354		5.8%
1840	5,333		59.0%
1850	4,128		−22.6%
1860	4,557		10.4%
1870	7,706		69.1%
1880	11,710		52.0%
1890	2,948		−74.8%
1900	3,202		8.6%
1910	3,074		−4.0%
1920	3,130		1.8%
1930	3,818		22.0%
1940	3,911		2.4%
1950	4,698		20.1%
1960	5,400		14.9%
1970	5,795		7.3%
1980	5,721		−1.3%
1990	5,962		4.2%
2000	5,820		−2.4%
2010	5,566		−4.4%
2020	5,557		−0.2%
U.S. Decennial Census

As of the census of 2010, there were 5,520 people, 2,243 households, and 1,531 families residing in the town. The population density was 196.1 inhabitants per square mile (75.7/km^{2}). There were 2,374 housing units at an average density of 80.0 per square mile (30.9/km^{2}). The racial makeup of the town was 94.77% White, 0.69% Black or African-American, 0.10% Native American, 0.24% Asian, 3.36% from other races, and 0.84% from two or more races. Hispanic or Latino of any race were 6.32% of the population.

There were 2,243 households, out of which 27.0% had children under the age of 18 living with them, 56.3% were married couples living together, 8.4% had a female householder with no husband present, and 31.7% were non-families. 27.6% of all households were made up of individuals, and 12.7% had someone living alone who was 65 years of age or older. The average household size was 2.41 and the average family size was 2.91.

In the town, the population was spread out, with 20.2% under the age of 18, 6.2% from 18 to 24, 24.4% from 25 to 44, 26.3% from 45 to 64, and 22.9% who were 65 years of age or older. The median age was 44 years. For every 100 females, there were 91.0 males. For every 100 females age 18 and over, there were 85.5 males.

The median income for a household in the town was $37,097, and the median income for a family was $46,667. Males had a median income of $34,476 versus $23,533 for females. The per capita income for the town was $19,099. About 5.1% of families and 7.0% of the population were below the poverty line, including 4.8% of those under age 18 and 8.6% of those age 65 or over.

== Communities and locations ==
- Church Corners – A hamlet near the western town line on NY-67.
- Cranesville – A hamlet east of Amsterdam city on NY-5 by the Mohawk River. The community is named after early settler David Crane.
- Crescent Park – A hamlet northeast of Amsterdam city.
- Evas Kill – A stream emptying into the Mohawk River, named after Evas van Alstyne, killed by natives in that location.
- Fort Johnson – A village located west of Amsterdam city on NY-5.
- Hagaman – A village formerly called "Hagamans Mills" northeast of Amsterdam city and located on North Chuctenunda Creek.
- Harrower – A hamlet northeast of Amsterdam city.
- Harrower Pond – A wide part of North Chuctanunda Creek.
- Manny Corners – A hamlet northeast of Amsterdam city.
- North Chuctanunda Creek – A tributary of the Mohawk River, flowing through Amsterdam city.

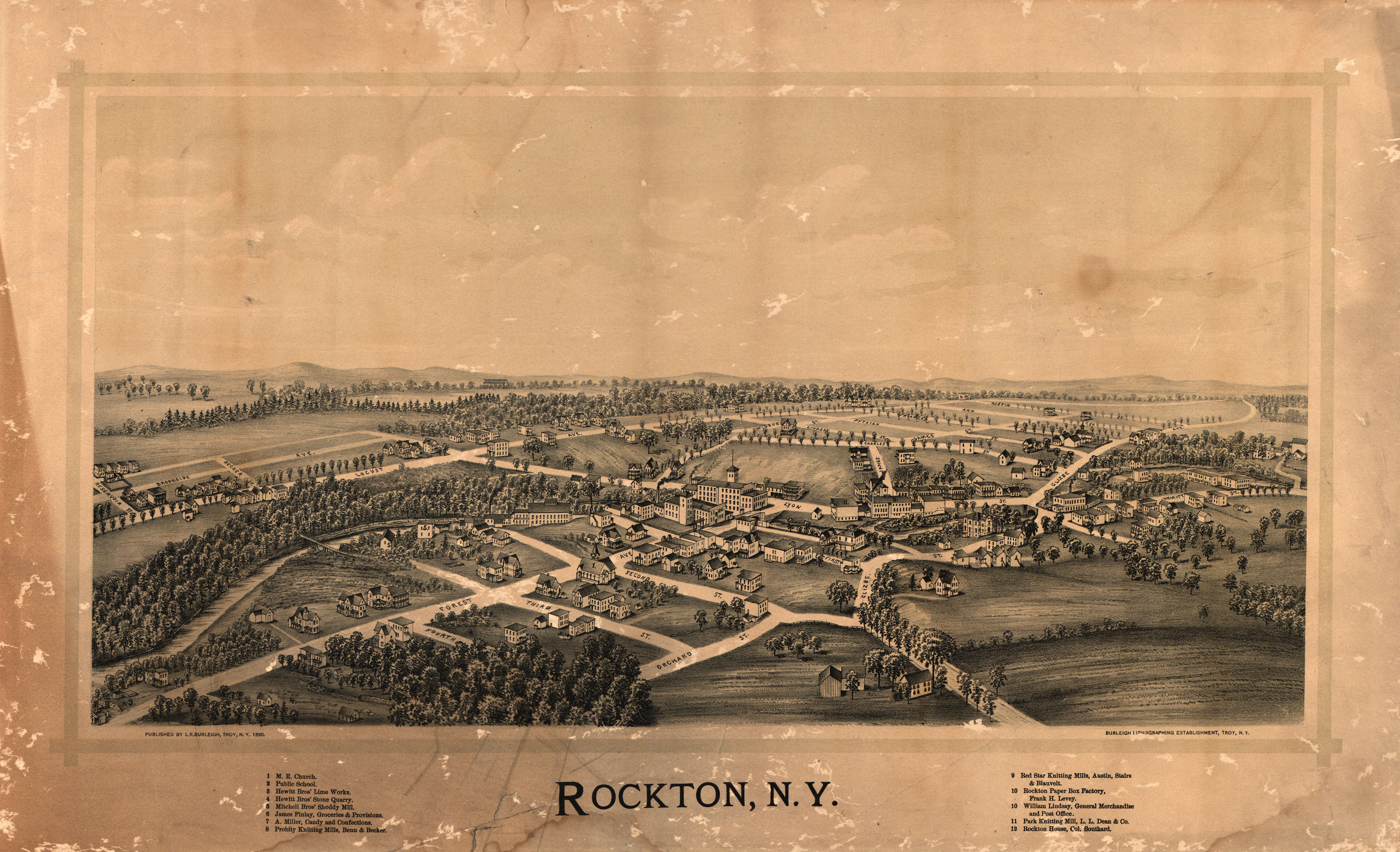
Perspective map of Rockton and a list of landmarks published in 1890 by L.R. Burleigh

- Rockton – A hamlet on the northern edge of Amsterdam city.
- Tribes Hill – A hamlet at the western town line on NY-5 and former meeting place of the local natives.
- Wallins Corners – A hamlet north of Amsterdam city.

== Also see ==
- Greater Amsterdam School District
