= St. Johnsville, New York =

- Town
- Location in Montgomery County and the state of New York

- Location of New York in the United States
- Coordinates: 42°59′59″N 74°40′42″W
- Country: United States
- State: New York
- County: Montgomery

Government
  - Town supervisor: Phoebe Sitterly (R)
  - Town council: List: Ronald R. Millington (R); Ronald A. Hezel (R); William A. Farber (R); Susan Handy (R)

Area
  - Total: 17.36 sq mi (44.96 km^{2})
  - Land: 16.84 sq mi (43.62 km^{2})
  - Water: 0.52 sq mi (1.34 km^{2})

Population (2020)
  - Total: 2,598
  - Density: 154.3/sq mi (59.6/km^{2})
- Time zone: EST
  - Summer (DST): EDT
- ZIP Codes: 13452 (St. Johnsville); 13339 (Fort Plain)
- FIPS code: 36-057-64650
- Website: townofstjohnsvilleny.com

St. Johnsville is a town in Montgomery County, New York, United States. The population was 2,598 at the 2020 census. The town contains a village, also called St. Johnsville. The town and village are approximately halfway between Utica and Amsterdam.

The Erie Canal, as part of the Mohawk River, is at the town's southern border.

== History ==
Perspective map of St. Johnsville with list of landmarks published in 1890 by L.R. Burleigh

The town was first settled around 1725. The territory was part of the Palatine District. In 1769, Sir William Johnson built a church in the town for the benefit of his Indian allies.

Accounts vary as to the source of the name "St. Johnsville", but most of them state that the town and its village are named after an early surveyor and commissioner, Alexander St. John. Still others credit the naming of St. Johnsville to a former name for the area, St. John's Church.

A brief skirmish was fought in the town in 1780 near Fort Klock, a fortified house.

The town of St. Johnsville was formed in 1838 from the town of Oppenheim, which then became part of the newly created Fulton County.

In 1857, the community of St. Johnsville set itself off from the town by incorporating as a village.

According to the Enterprise and News, November 17, 1937, by 1934, Mr. and Mrs. Joseph H. Reaney had given 120 acres of land to the Village of Saint Johnsville. This land was named Klock Park after Dr. Charles M. Klock, a highly regarded local physician. Today the H.C Smith Benefit Club utilizes the building to host many community events.

The First Methodist Episcopal Church of St. Johnsville, Fort Klock, Enlarged Double Lock No. 33 Old Erie Canal, Nellis Tavern, and Margaret Reaney Memorial Library are listed on the National Register of Historic Places.

== Geography ==
St. Johnsville is in the northwestern corner of Montgomery County, bordered to the north by Fulton County; to the west, across East Canada Creek, by Herkimer County; to the east by the town of Palatine; and to the south, across the Mohawk River, by the town of Minden.

St. Johnsville is the smallest town in the county by area. According to the U.S. Census Bureau, the town has a total area of 17.4 square miles (45 km^{2}), of which 16.8 square miles (44 km^{2}) are land and 0.5 square miles (1.3 km^{2}), or 2.98%, are water. The town is drained by south-flowing tributaries of the Mohawk River, including, from west to east, East Canada Creek, Crum Creek, Timmerman Creek, Zimmerman Creek, and Mother Creek.

New York State Route 5 is an east-west highway in the southern part of the town. It leads southeast 8 miles (13 km) to Palatine Bridge and northwest 10 miles (16 km) to Little Falls. Via NY-5, Amsterdam is 31 miles (50 km) to the east and Utica is 33 miles (53 km) to the west. The western terminus of State Route 67 is at NY-5, east of St. Johnsville village. NY-67 leads east 17 miles (27 km) to Johnstown. The southern terminus of NY-331 is near the northwestern part of the town.

== Demographics ==
Historical population
Census	Pop.	Note	%±
1840	1,923		—
1850	1,627		−15.4%
1860	1,688		3.7%
1870	2,189		29.7%
1880	2,062		−5.8%
1890	2,081		0.9%
1900	2,674		28.5%
1910	3,369		26.0%
1920	3,123		−7.3%
1930	3,000		−3.9%
1940	2,974		−0.9%
1950	2,934		−1.3%
1960	2,958		0.8%
1970	2,915		−1.5%
1980	3,064		5.1%
1990	2,773		−9.5%
2000	2,567		−7.4%
2010	2,631		2.5%
2020	2,598		−1.3%
U.S. Decennial Census

As of the census of 2000, there were 2,565 people, 1,043 households, and 658 families residing in the town. The population density was 152.4 inhabitants per square mile (58.8/km^{2}). There were 1,170 housing units at an average density of 69.5 per square mile (26.8/km^{2}). The racial makeup of the town was 98.67% White, 0.08% Black or African American, 0.39% Native American, 0.16% Asian, 0.04% Pacific Islander, 0.12% from other races, and 0.55% from two or more races. Hispanic or Latino of any race were 1.36% of the population.

There were 1,043 households, out of which 27.8% had children under the age of 18 living with them, 45.7% were married couples living together, 12.0% had a female householder with no husband present, and 36.9% were non-families. 31.5% of all households were made up of individuals, and 17.5% had someone living alone who was 65 years of age or older. The average household size was 2.35 and the average family size was 2.91.

In the town, the population was spread out, with 23.4% under the age of 18, 8.0% from 18 to 24, 24.1% from 25 to 44, 22.4% from 45 to 64, and 22.1% who were 65 years of age or older. The median age was 41 years. For every 100 females, there were 91.6 males. For every 100 females age 18 and over, there were 87.8 males.

The median income for a household in the town was $30,719, and the median income for a family was $39,830. Males had a median income of $25,000 versus $21,010 for females. The per capita income for the town was $15,116. About 9.5% of families and 12.4% of the population were below the poverty line, including 20.4% of those under age 18 and 6.5% of those age 65 or over.

== Communities and locations in the Town of St. Johnsville ==
- East Canada Creek – A stream defining the western town line.
- Fort Klock – A historic fortified house, built by Johannes Klock in 1750, located east of St. Johnsville village on the south side of NY-5. The property also contains other re-constructed or re-located historic structures.
- Klock Park – A park northwest of St. Johnsville village, named after Dr. Charles M. Klock.
- St. Johnsville – A village on the north shore of the Mohawk River on NY-5.
- West St. Johnsville (or Upper St. Johnsville) – A hamlet west of St. Johnsville village on NY-5.
