= Mohawk, Montgomery County, New York =

Coordinates: 42°57′30″N 74°25′01″W

Mohawk, New York
- Town
- Location in Montgomery County and the state of New York.

- Location of New York in the United States
- Country: United States
- State: New York
- County: Montgomery

Government
  - Town supervisor: Gregory W. Rajkowski (NP) Town council: Nancy A. Collins (D); Bette A. Papa (R); Bruce J. Pavlus (R); James H. Huffman (R)

Area
  - Total: 35.39 sq mi (91.67 km^{2})
  - Land: 34.68 sq mi (89.82 km^{2})
  - Water: 0.71 sq mi (1.85 km^{2})

Population (2020)
  - Total: 3,572
  - Density: 102.5/sq mi (39.6/km^{2})
- Time zone: UTC−05 (EST)
  - Summer (DST): UTC−04 (EDT)
- ZIP Codes: 12068 (Fonda); 12095 (Johnstown); 12177 (Tribes Hill); 13428 (Palatine Bridge)
- FIPS code: 36-057-47834
- Website: townofmohawkny.com

Mohawk is a town in Montgomery County, New York, United States. The population was 3,572 at the 2020 census, down from 3,844 in 2010.

The town is on the northern border of the county, west of Amsterdam. The county seat, Fonda, is in Mohawk.

== History ==
Jesuit missionaries entered the region from Quebec around 1642 to work among the Mohawk people. The principal village of the Mohawk was Caughnawaga, which was later developed as the site of Fonda.

The area that became Mohawk was settled around 1725 by colonists from the English/Dutch region to the east around Albany. The Mohawk District, which became the original town of Mohawk, was created in March 1772 by Sir William Johnson when Tryon County was split off from Albany County. It was the easternmost of five districts in the new county, which eastern boundary ran north from the Delaware River at the Pennsylvania line through present Schoharie County to a north–south line that now forms the eastern boundaries of Montgomery, Fulton, and Hamilton counties, all the way to Canada. The district's western limit was an arbitrary north–south line drawn through "the noses", prominent rock prominences through which the Mohawk River flows four miles east of Canajoharie (on the south side).

During the American Revolution, the town was invaded in 1780 by an army of British-allied Iroquois and British Loyalists. The original District or "Town of Mohawk" was eliminated in 1793 by its division into the towns of Florida and Charleston. The present town was created from part of the town of Johnstown in 1837, the population of which was 3,112.

In 1865, the population of Mohawk was 2,948.

In 1993, Montgomery Manor, a colonial estate of Major Jelles Fonda, was purchased by the not-for-profit community Kanatsiohareke ("Gah nah joe hah lay geh"). This Haudenosaunee community, led by elder and spiritual leader Tom Sakokwenionkwas Porter, looks to promote the development of the traditions, philosophy, and governance of the Haudenosaunee and to contribute to the preservation of their culture.

== Geography ==
The town of Mohawk is in north-central Montgomery County. It is bordered to the north by Fulton County, to the east by the town of Amsterdam, to the west by the town of Palatine, and to the south by the Mohawk River. The village of Fonda, the Montgomery County seat, is in the south-central part of the town, on the north bank of the Mohawk.

New York State Route 5 parallels the Mohawk River, leading east (downriver) 10 miles (16 km) to Amsterdam and west (upriver) 11 miles (18 km) to Palatine Bridge. New York State Route 30A and New York State Route 334 intersect NY-5 at Fonda. NY 30A leads north 4 miles (6 km) to Johnstown and south 15 miles (24 km) to Sloansville. NY 334 leads northwest 4 miles (6 km) to Sammonsville.

According to the U.S. Census Bureau, the town of Mohawk has a total area of 35.4 square miles (92 km^{2}), of which 34.7 square miles (90 km^{2}) are land and 0.7 square miles (1.8 km^{2}), or 2.01%, are water. The town is drained by south-flowing tributaries of the Mohawk River, most notably Cayadutta Creek, which enters the Mohawk at Fonda, and Danascara Creek, which drains the eastern part of the town.

== Demographics ==
Historical population
Census	Pop.	Note	%±
1840	2,112		—
1850	3,095		46.5%
1860	3,136		1.3%
1870	3,015		−3.9%
1880	2,943		−2.4%
1890	2,839		−3.5%
1900	2,711		−4.5%
1910	2,488		−8.2%
1920	2,353		−5.4%
1930	2,730		16.0%
1940	2,753		0.8%
1950	2,680		−2.7%
1960	3,070		14.6%
1970	3,677		19.8%
1980	3,795		3.2%
1990	3,976		4.8%
2000	3,909		−1.7%
2010	3,844		−1.7%
2020	3,572		−7.1%
U.S. Decennial Census

As of the census of 2010, there were 3,844 people, 1,528 households, and 1,043 families residing in the town. The population density was 112.4 inhabitants per square mile (43.4/km^{2}). There were 1,607 housing units at an average density of 46.3 per square mile (17.9/km^{2}). The racial makeup of the town was 97.7% White, 0.4% African-American, 0.2% Native American, 0.5% Asian, 0.2% from other races, and 1% from two or more races. Hispanic or Latino of any race were 2.2% of the population.

There were 1,528 households, out of which 26.6% had children under the age of 18 living with them, 68.3% were married couples living together, 10.8% had a female householder with no husband present, and 31.7% were non-families. 30.2% of all households were made up of individuals, and 28% had someone living alone who was 65 years of age or older. The average household size was 2.49 and the average family size was 2.98.

In the town, the population was spread out, with 25.4% under the age of 18, 6.8% from 18 to 24, 28.2% from 25 to 44, 24.8% from 45 to 64, and 14.2% who were 65 years of age or older. The median age was 38 years. For every 100 females, there were 94.2 males. For every 100 females age 18 and over, there were 93.4 males.

The median income for a household in the town was $25,714, and the median income for a family was $62,174. Males had a median income of $37,465 versus $36,891 for females. The per capita income for the town was $27,725. About 2.8% of families and 7.4% of the population were below the poverty line, including 3.4% of those under age 18 and 6.2% of those age 65 or over.

== Locations in the town ==
- Berryville – A hamlet northwest of Fonda.
- Big Nose – A location in the southwestern part of Mohawk. With "Little Nose" on the opposite bank of the Mohawk River, it marks a place called "The Noses".
- East Stone Arabia – A hamlet in the western part of the town.
- Fonda – A village on the north bank of the Mohawk River and NY Route 5. It is the Montgomery county seat and is near the Caughnawaga Indian Village Site.
- Tribes Hill – A hamlet in the eastern part of the town on NY-5.
- Yosts – A hamlet on NY-5 and the north bank of the Mohawk River, west of Fonda.
