= Fort Johnson (disambiguation) =

Fort Johnson (formerly Fort Polk) is a US military base in Vernon Parish, Louisiana. It may also refer to:

- Fort Johnson (19th century), a historic site in Hancock County, Illinois
- Fort Johnson (South Carolina), a historic site on the northeast point of James Island, South Carolina, also adjacent to Fort Sumter
- Fort Johnson, New York, a village in Montgomery County
- Fort Johnson Volunteer Fire Company, a fire company in Fort Johnson, New York
- Old Fort Johnson, a historic house in the village of Fort Johnson, New York
