= Hagaman, New York =

- Village
- Location within New York Location within the United States
- Coordinates: 42°58′39″N 74°9′2″W
- Country: United States
- State: New York
- County: Montgomery
- Town: Amsterdam

Area
  - Total: 1.54 sq mi (4.00 km^{2})
  - Land: 1.50 sq mi (3.88 km^{2})
  - Water: 0.046 sq mi (0.12 km^{2})
- Elevation: 719 ft (219 m)

Population (2020)
  - Total: 1,117
  - Density: 745.7/sq mi (287.91/km^{2})
- Time zone: UTC-5 (Eastern (EST))
  - Summer (DST): UTC-4 (EDT)
- ZIP Codes: 12086 (Hagaman); 12010 (Amsterdam)
- Area code: 518
- FIPS code: 36-31291
- GNIS feature ID: 0951983
- Website: Village website

Hagaman (/ˈheɪɡəmən/), formerly Hagamans Mills, is a village in Montgomery County, New York, United States. The population was 1,117 at the 2020 census, down from 1,292 in 2010. It is named after Joseph Hagaman, the founding father.

The village is in the town of Amsterdam, northeast of the city of Amsterdam.

== History ==
Perspective map of Hagamans Mills from 1890 with many landmarks by L.R. Burleigh

The community was formerly called "Hagamans Mills". It was founded circa 1777. Village offices are located in the historic Pawling Hall, listed on the National Register of Historic Places in 2002.

== Geography ==
Hagaman is located in northeastern Montgomery County at 42°58′39″N 74°9′2″W (42.977531, -74.150493), in the northern part of the town of Amsterdam. It is bordered to the north by the town of Perth in Fulton County. The city of Amsterdam is 3 miles (5 km) to the southwest.

According to the U.S. Census Bureau, the village of Hagaman has a total area of 1.54 square miles (3.99 km^{2}), of which 1.50 square miles (3.88 km^{2}) are land and 0.05 square miles (0.13 km^{2}), or 2.98%, are water. North Chuctanunda Creek passes through the center of the village, flowing southwest to join the Mohawk River at Amsterdam.

== Demographics ==
Historical population
| Census | Pop. | Note | %± |
|---|---|---|---|
| 1870 | 250 | | — |
| 1890 | 596 | | — |
| 1900 | 646 | | 8.4% |
| 1910 | 875 | | 35.4% |
| 1920 | 855 | | −2.3% |
| 1930 | 867 | | 1.4% |
| 1940 | 933 | | 7.6% |
| 1950 | 1,114 | | 19.4% |
| 1960 | 1,292 | | 16.0% |
| 1970 | 1,410 | | 9.1% |
| 1980 | 1,331 | | −5.6% |
| 1990 | 1,377 | | 3.5% |
| 2000 | 1,357 | | −1.5% |
| 2010 | 1,292 | | −4.8% |
| 2020 | 1,117 | | −13.5% |
U.S. Decennial Census

At the 2000 census there were 1,357 people, 557 households, and 374 families living in the village. The population density was 880.3 inhabitants per square mile (339.9/km^{2}). There were 582 housing units at an average density of 377.5 per square mile (145.8/km^{2}). The racial makeup of the village was 97.79% White, 0.44% African American, 0.52% Asian, 0.44% from other races, and 0.81% from two or more races. Hispanic or Latino of any race were 2.21%.

Of the 557 households 26.4% had children under the age of 18 living with them, 54.4% were married couples living together, 9.7% had a female householder with no husband present, and 32.7% were non-families. 29.1% of households were one person and 15.1% were one person aged 65 or older. The average household size was 2.41 and the average family size was 2.94.

The age distribution was 22.0% under the age of 18, 7.1% from 18 to 24, 25.6% from 25 to 44, 27.3% from 45 to 64, and 17.9% 65 or older. The median age was 42 years. For every 100 females, there were 99.3 males. For every 100 females age 18 and over, there were 93.1 males.

The median household income was $41,875 and the median family income was $52,500. Males had a median income of $32,463 versus $25,319 for females. The per capita income for the village was $19,527. About 3.8% of families and 6.7% of the population were below the poverty line, including 7.2% of those under age 18 and 13.6% of those age 65 or over.

== Current leadership ==
The village currently has Robert Tom Krom as the mayor, with several other trustees serving as a legislature.
