= East Branch Mohawk River (New York) =

- Location of the mouth of East Branch Mohawk River East Branch Mohawk River (New York) (the United States)

Location
- Country: United States
- State: New York
- Region: Central New York Region
- Counties: Lewis, Oneida
- Towns: West Turin, Ava, Lee

Physical characteristics
- Source
  - location: S of Mohawk Hill
  - coordinates: 43°30′51″N 75°28′02″W
- Mouth: Mohawk River
  - location: E of West Branch
  - coordinates: 43°22′15″N 75°28′06″W
  - elevation: 932 ft (284 m)

East Branch Mohawk River is a river in Lewis County and Oneida County in the U.S. state of New York. It begins south of the hamlet of Mohawk Hill, flows through the hamlet of West Leyden and empties into Mohawk River east of the hamlet of West Branch.
