= Wood Creek (disambiguation) =

Wood Creek is a tributary of Oneida Lake in New York.

For other uses:

- Rural Municipality of Wood Creek No. 281, Saskatchewan, Canada
- Wood Creek (Champlain Canal tributary), in New York
- Wood Creek (Mohawk River tributary), in New York
- Wood Creek Lake, in Kentucky
