= Blue Brook =

Location
- Country: United States
- State: New York

Physical characteristics
- Mouth: Mohawk River
  - location: West Branch, New York
  - coordinates: 43°22′30″N 75°26′52″W
  - elevation: 858 ft (262 m)
- Basin size: 3.46 mi^{2} (9.0 km^{2})

Blue Brook flows into the Mohawk River near West Branch, New York.
