= East Branch Mohawk River =

East Branch Mohawk River may refer to the following rivers:

- East Branch Mohawk River (New Hampshire), in New Hampshire
- East Branch Mohawk River (New York), in New York
