= West Branch Mohawk River =

West Branch Mohawk River may refer to the following rivers:

- West Branch Mohawk River (New Hampshire), in New Hampshire
- West Branch Mohawk River (New York), in New York
