= Fort Klock =

- U.S. National Register of Historic Places
- U.S. National Historic Landmark
- New York State Register of Historic Places
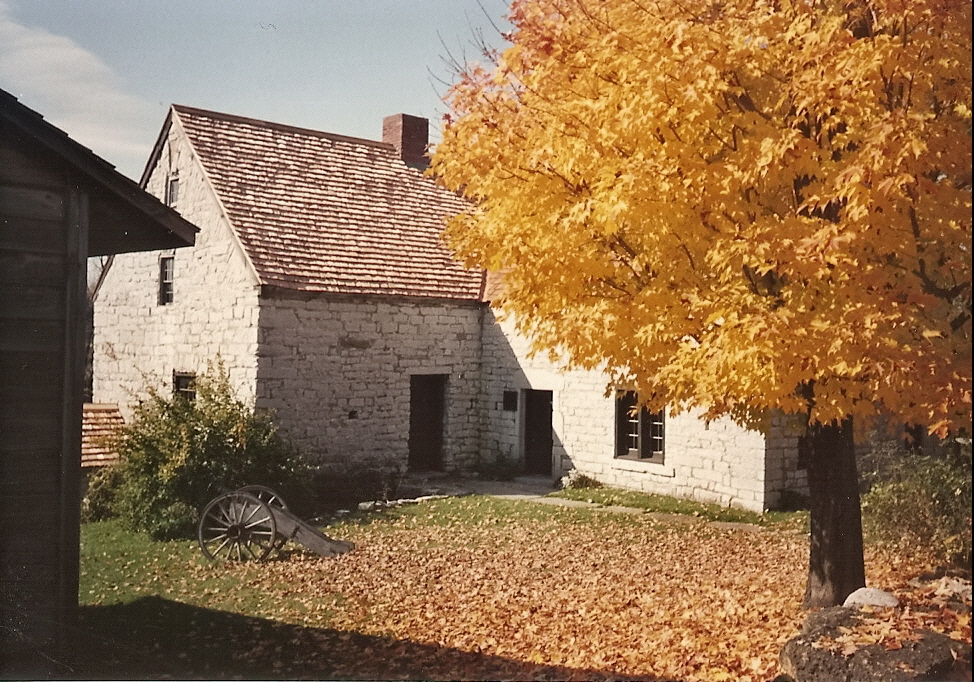
- Fort Klock in September 1991

- Location within New York Location within the United States
- Nearest city: St. Johnsville, New York
- Coordinates: 42°59′6.92″N 74°38′56.84″W
- Area: 10 acres (4.0 ha)
- Built: 1750
- Built by: Johannes Klock
- NRHP reference No.: 72000859
- NYSRHP No.: 05710.000001

Significant dates
- Added to NRHP: November 28, 1972
- Designated NHL: November 28, 1972
- Designated NYSRHP: June 23, 1980

Fort Klock, a fortified stone homestead in the Mohawk River Valley of Upstate New York, was built c.1750 by Johannes Klock, and is a good example of a mid-18th century fortified home and trading post, seeing use during the French and Indian War and the American Revolutionary War The fort is located at 7203 Route 5 roughly two miles (3 km) east of the Village of St. Johnsville, New York. Fort Klock is part of a 30-acre (12 ha) complex that includes the historic homestead, a renovated Colonial Dutch Barn, blacksmith shop, and 19th-century schoolhouse. The site is maintained by Fort Klock Historic Restoration and is open seasonally as a living museum. The fort was declared a National Historic Landmark in 1972.

== Description and history ==
Fort Klock is located between New York State Route 5 and the Mohawk River, two miles east of the village of St. Johnsville. The fort is a single-story stone structure, built in an L shape and set in part on bedrock, and in part on a stone foundation. The walls are quite thick (typically 2 feet (0.61 m)), with numerous loopholes through which defenders could fire. There are two chambers on the main floor, their walls finished in plaster. Bedrooms are located in the attic spaces. A door on the east side provides access to the basement, which is divided into two chambers, separated by a heavy stone wall. One of these has a small spring-fed pool.

The house was built in 1750 by Johannes Klock, replacing an older structure built on the same site. Klock used the building as a frontier residence and trading post for dealing with local Native Americans. In 1776, Klock further fortified the premises, building a wooden stockade around the building. Klock was an active partisan in the American Revolutionary War, serving in the local militia at the 1777 Battle of Oriskany. The surrounding area was repeatedly raided by British-led Native Americans between 1778 and 1782, actions in which many houses, barns, and crops were burned. In October 1780, one of these raiding bands was confronted by state militia in a field just to the west, in what is now known as the Battle of Klock's Field.

The property was occupied by Klock descendants until the 1950s, at which time it was abandoned and declined. It was restored by a local nonprofit organization (now Fort Klock Historic Restoration), which was given the property by the last Klock owners in 1973.

== Other Fort Klock ==
There were two distinct places referred to as Fort Klock during the Revolutionary War: Johannes' house and the home of his brother, Conradt Klock, located in Reimensnyders Bush or Glen's Purchase to the north of Little Falls, New York. The Klock Forts were but two of the plethora of fortifications in the central and upper Mohawk Valley, built to resist raids from the British and their allies.
