= Plotter Kill =

Plotter Kill may refer to

- Plotter Kill (Mohawk River) – a tributary of the Mohawk River
- Plotter Kill Preserve – a nature preserve in Rotterdam, New York
