= Collinsville Cemetery =

Collinsville Cemetery may refer to:

- Collinsville Cemetery, Queensland, a heritage-listed cemetery in Australia
- Collinsville Cemetery (New York), listed on the National Register of Historic Places (NRHP) in Lewis County
