= Pawling Hall =

- U.S. National Register of Historic Places
- Location within New York Location within the United States
- Location: 86 Pawling St., Hagaman, New York
- Coordinates: 42°58′39″N 74°9′7″W
- Area: 0.3 acres (0.12 ha)
- Built: 1891
- Architectural style: Italianate
- NRHP reference No.: 02001331
- Added to NRHP: November 15, 2002

Pawling Hall is a historic meeting hall located at Hagaman in Montgomery County, New York, US. It was built in 1891 and is a simple two-story, brick masonry building with a gable roof in the Italianate style. It incorporates a meeting hall, small performance stage, and village government offices.

It was added to the National Register of Historic Places in 2002.
