= Dove Creek (Mohawk River tributary) =

Location
- Country: United States
- State: New York

Physical characteristics
- Mouth: Mohawk River
  - location: Amsterdam, New York
  - coordinates: 42°57′05″N 74°12′59″W
  - elevation: 268 ft (82 m)
- Basin size: 1.7 mi^{2} (4.4 km^{2})

Dove Creek flows into the Mohawk River near Amsterdam, New York.
