= Zimmerman Creek =

- Location of the mouth of Zimmerman Creek Zimmerman Creek (the United States)

Location
- Country: United States
- State: New York

Physical characteristics
- Mouth: Mohawk River
  - location: St. Johnsville, New York
  - coordinates: 42°59′39″N 74°41′17″W
  - elevation: 306 ft (93 m)
- Basin size: 14 sq mi (36 km^{2})

Zimmerman Creek flows into the Mohawk River in St. Johnsville, New York.
