= Gridley Creek =

Location
- Country: United States
- State: New York

Physical characteristics
- Mouth: Mohawk River
  - location: Whitesboro, New York
  - coordinates: 43°07′23″N 75°14′30″W
  - elevation: 404 ft (123 m)
- Basin size: 3.35 mi^{2} (8.7 km^{2})

Gridley Creek flows into the Mohawk River in Whitesboro, New York.
