= Kayaderosseras Creek (Mohawk River tributary) =

River in New York State, United States

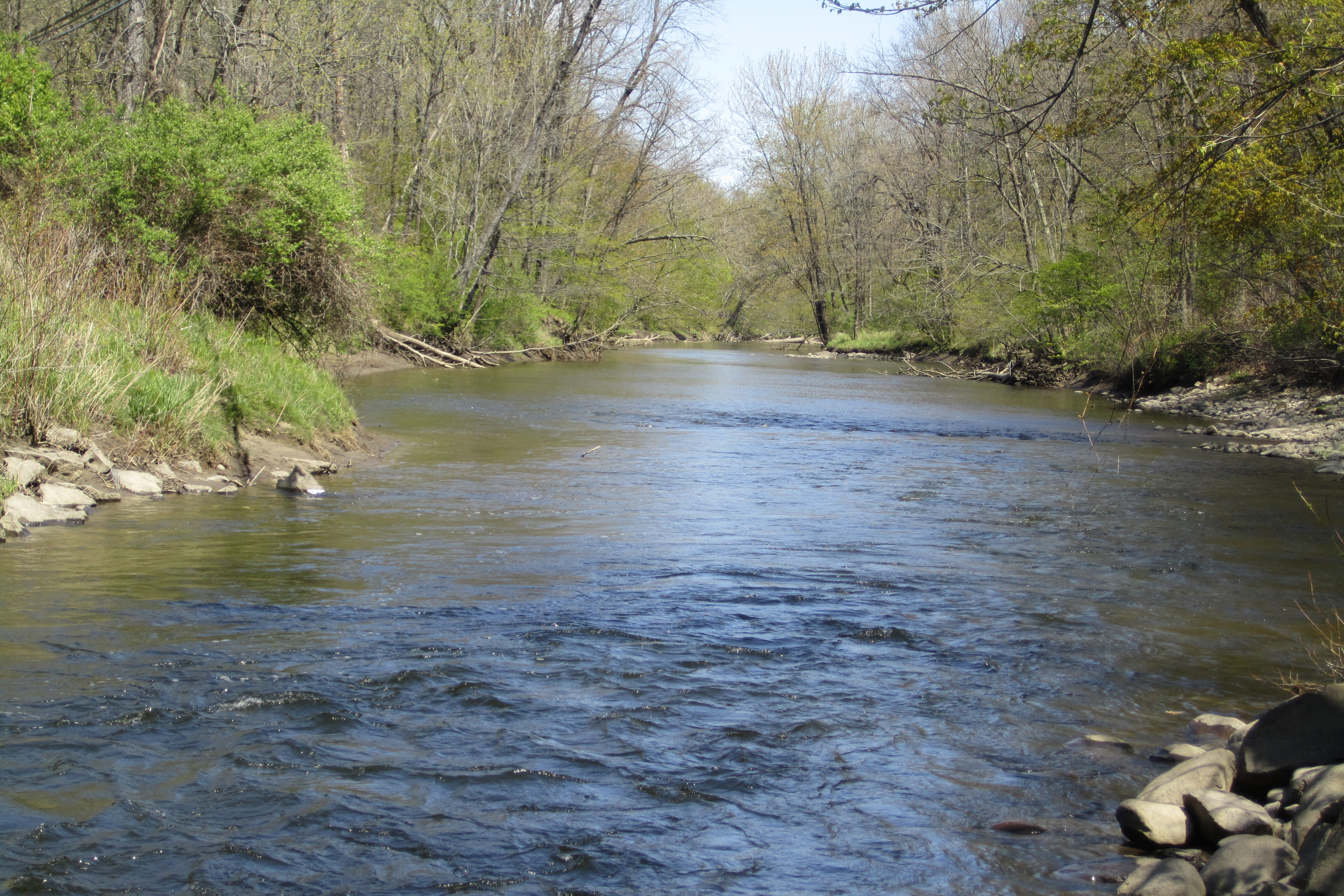
- The creek in 2012

- Location of the mouth within New York Kayaderosseras Creek (Mohawk River tributary) (the United States)

Location
- Country: United States
- State: New York
- Counties: Fulton, Montgomery
- Towns: Johnstown, Perth, Amsterdam

Physical characteristics
- Source
  - location: Southeast of Johnstown
  - coordinates: 42°59′35″N 74°19′32″W
- Mouth: Mohawk River
  - location: Fort Johnson
  - coordinates: 42°57′24″N 74°14′27″W
  - elevation: 266 ft (81 m)
- Basin size: 16.9 sq mi (44 km^{2})

Basin features
- Tributaries
  - left: McQueen Creek

Kayaderosseras Creek also called Kaniatarósera'as Stream is a river located in Montgomery and Fulton counties in the state of New York. The creek begins southeast of Johnstown and flows in a generally southeast direction before converging with the Mohawk River by Fort Johnson, just west of Amsterdam. Kaniatarósera'as Stream, is a Mohawk name which translates to "waves splashing".

== Hydrology ==
Most of the land within the watershed is rural and agricultural. The water quality in the Kayaderosseras Creek watershed is rated in good condition.
