= Knauderack Creek =

Location
- Country: United States
- State: New York

Physical characteristics
- Mouth: Mohawk River
  - location: Sprakers, New York
  - coordinates: 42°53′53″N 74°29′32″W
  - elevation: 291 ft (89 m)
- Basin size: 9.14 mi^{2} (23.7 km^{2})

The Knauderack Creek flows into the Mohawk River near Sprakers, New York.
