= Pratt Creek =

- Location of the mouth within New York Pratt Creek (the United States)

Location
- Country: United States
- State: New York
- County: Herkimer

Physical characteristics
- Mouth: Mohawk River
  - location: Frankfort
  - coordinates: 43°03′49″N 75°05′35″W
  - elevation: 385 ft (117 m)
- Basin size: 2.55 sq mi (6.6 km^{2})

Pratt Creek is a river in Herkimer County in the state of New York. It flows into the Mohawk River near Frankfort.

== Water quality ==
Water in the Pratt Creek watershed is moderately healthy.
