= Hurlbut Glen Brook =

Location
- Country: United States
- State: New York

Physical characteristics
- Mouth: Mohawk River
  - location: Rome, New York
  - coordinates: 43°16′20″N 75°25′50″W
  - elevation: 470 ft (140 m)
- Basin size: 2.77 mi^{2} (7.2 km^{2})

The Hurlbut Glen Brook is a stream that flows into the Mohawk River in Rome, New York.
