= Cranesville, New York =

- Populated place
- Location within the state of New York Cranesville (the United States)
- Coordinates: 42°55′02″N 074°08′05″W
- Country: United States
- State: New York
- County: Montgomery
- Town: Amsterdam
- Elevation: 269 ft (82 m)
- Time zone: UTC-7 (Mountain (MST))
  - Summer (DST): UTC-7 (MST)
- Area code: 518
- FIPS code: 04-18861
- GNIS feature ID: 947708

Cranesville is a populated place situated in Montgomery County, New York, United States. It is hamlet within the town of Amsterdam on New York State Route 5, along the Mohawk River. It has an estimated elevation of 269 feet (82 m) above sea level. The community is named after early settler David Crane. Cranesville was struck by a tornado in September 2011 which caused significant tree damage along with some damage to buildings.
