= Chaughtanoonda Creek =

Location
- Country: United States
- State: New York

Physical characteristics
- Mouth: Mohawk River
  - location: Hoffmans, New York
  - coordinates: 42°53′46″N 74°04′59″W
  - elevation: 238 ft (73 m)
- Basin size: 1.15 mi^{2} (3.0 km^{2})

Chaughtanoonda Creek flows into the Mohawk River in Hoffmans, New York.
