= Haynes Brook =

Location
- Country: United States
- State: New York

Physical characteristics
- Mouth: Mohawk River
  - location: Hillside, New York
  - coordinates: 43°21′33″N 75°24′54″W
  - elevation: 739 ft (225 m)
- Basin size: 3.75 mi^{2} (9.7 km^{2})

Haynes Brook flows into the Mohawk River in Hillside, New York.
