= Danascara Creek =

Location
- Country: United States
- State: New York
- Counties: Fulton, Montgomery

Physical characteristics
- Source
  - coordinates: 42°59′32″N 74°21′07″W
- Mouth: Mohawk River
  - location: Auriesville, New York
  - coordinates: 42°56′08″N 74°19′05″W
- Basin size: 8.61 mi^{2} (22.3 km^{2})

Danascara Creek is a river that flows into the Mohawk River by Auriesville, New York. The creek begins southeast of Johnstown and flows in a generally southeast direction before converging with the Mohawk River by Tribes Hill.
