= McMullen Brook =

- Location of the mouth of McMullen Brook McMullen Brook (the United States)

Location
- Country: United States
- State: New York

Physical characteristics
- Mouth: Mohawk River
  - location: Beartown, New York
  - coordinates: 43°22′03″N 75°26′02″W
  - elevation: 801 ft (244 m)
- Basin size: 1.58 sq mi (4.1 km^{2})

McMullen Brook flows into the Mohawk River northeast of Beartown, New York.
