= Wells Creek (Mohawk River tributary) =

Location
- Country: United States
- State: New York

Physical characteristics
- Mouth: Mohawk River
  - location: Frenchville, New York
  - coordinates: 43°19′28″N 75°21′44″W
  - elevation: 569 ft (173 m)
- Basin size: 23.9 sq mi (62 km^{2})

Wells Creek flows into the Mohawk River in Frenchville, New York.
