= Bunn Creek =

- Location of the mouth within New York Bunn Creek (the United States)

Location
- Country: United States
- State: New York

Physical characteristics
- Mouth: Mohawk River
  - location: Amsterdam, New York
  - coordinates: 42°56′26″N 74°11′12″W
- Basin size: 4.52 sq mi (11.7 km^{2})

Bunn Creek is a river that flows into the Mohawk River in Amsterdam, New York.
