= Crane Creek (Mohawk River tributary) =

Location
- Country: United States
- State: New York

Physical characteristics
- Mouth: Mohawk River
  - location: Oriskany, New York
  - coordinates: 43°09′03″N 75°18′08″W
  - elevation: 419 ft (128 m)
- Basin size: 6.65 mi^{2} (17.2 km^{2})

The Crane Creek flows into the Mohawk River in Oriskany, New York.
