= Stony Creek (Mohawk River tributary) =

Location
- Country: United States
- State: New York

Physical characteristics
- Mouth: Mohawk River
  - location: Niskayuna, New York
  - coordinates: 42°47′40″N 73°49′52″W
  - elevation: 200 ft (61 m)

Stony Creek is a river that flows into the Mohawk River in Vischer Ferry, New York.
