= West Branch Mohawk River (New York) =

- Location of the mouth of West Branch Mohawk River West Branch Mohawk River (New York) (the United States)

Location
- Country: United States
- State: New York
- Region: Central New York Region
- County: Oneida
- Town: Lee

Physical characteristics
- Source: Egger Brook
- 2nd source: Lyman Brook
- Source confluence
  - location: W of West Branch (hamlet)
  - coordinates: 43°22′12″N 75°30′29″W
- Mouth: Mohawk River
  - location: E of West Branch (hamlet)
  - coordinates: 43°22′15″N 75°28′06″W
  - elevation: 932 ft (284 m)

West Branch Mohawk River is a river in Oneida County, New York. It begins at the confluence of Egger Brook and Lyman Brook, flows through the hamlet of West Branch, and empties into Mohawk River east of the hamlet.
