= Evas Kill =

- Location of the mouth of Evas Kill Evas Kill (the United States)

Location
- Country: United States
- State: New York
- Region: Central New York
- Counties: Fulton, Montgomery

Physical characteristics
- Source
  - coordinates: 42°59′15″N 74°06′57″W
- Mouth: Mohawk River
  - location: Cranesville
  - coordinates: 42°55′01″N 74°08′13″W
  - elevation: 239 ft (73 m)
- Basin size: 11.3 sq mi (29 km^{2})

Evas Kill is a river in Fulton and Montgomery counties in the state of New York. It flows into the Mohawk River in Cranesville. Evas Kill flows through Cranes Hollow.

== Fishing ==
Suckers can be speared and taken from the section of the creek within Montgomery County from January 1 to May 15, each year.
