= Washout Creek =

Location
- Country: United States
- State: New York

Physical characteristics
- Mouth: Mohawk River
  - location: Rotterdam Junction, New York
  - coordinates: 42°51′52″N 74°01′38″W
  - elevation: 224 ft (68 m)
- Basin size: 3.48 sq mi (9.0 km^{2})

Washout Creek flows into the Mohawk River near Rotterdam Junction, New York.
