= First Methodist Episcopal Church of St. Johnsville =

Historic church in New York, United States

- U.S. National Register of Historic Places
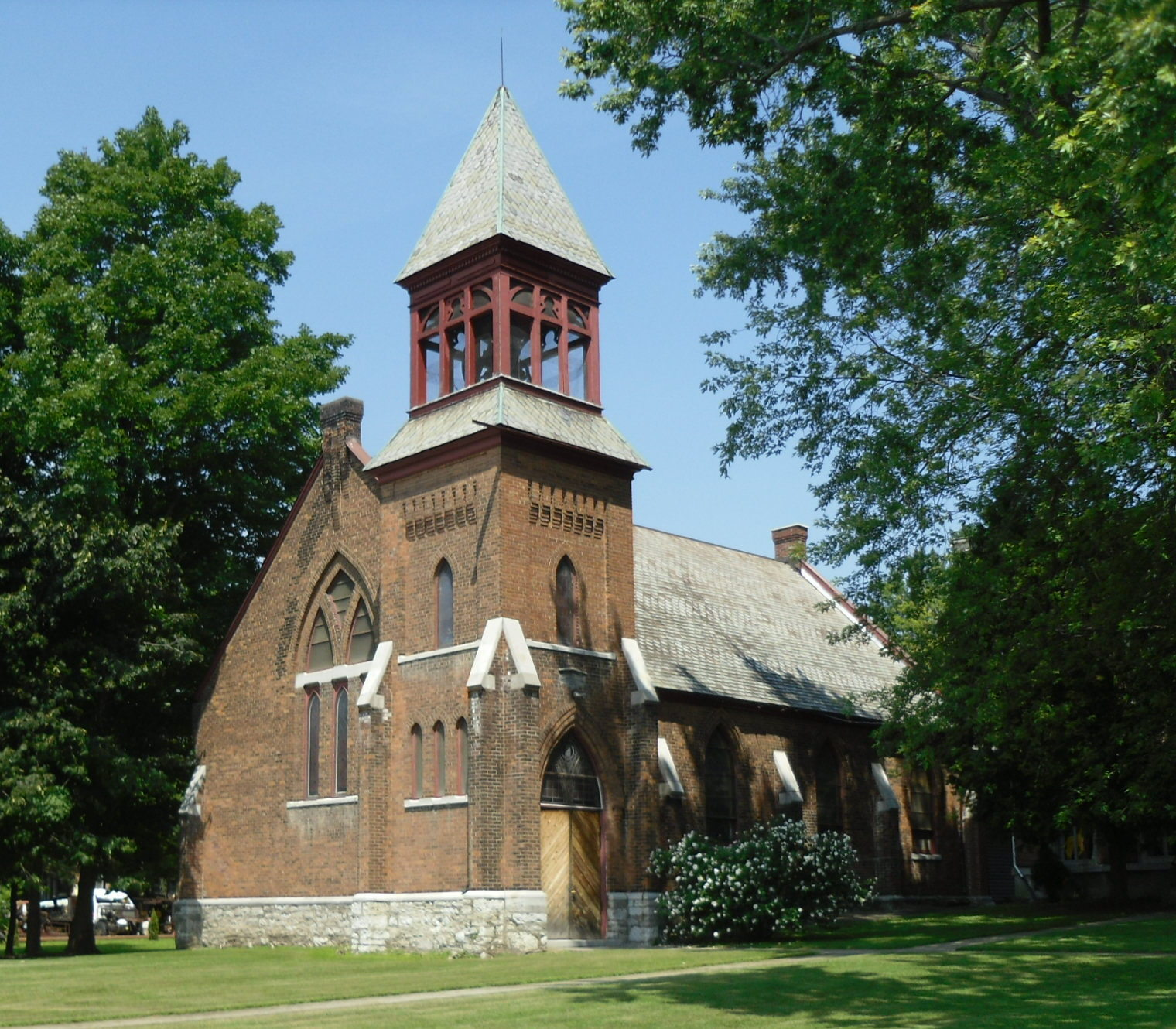
- First Methodist Episcopal Church of St. Johnsville, August 2010

- Location within New York Location within the United States
- Location: 5 W. Main St., St. Johnsville, New York
- Coordinates: 42°59′55″N 74°40′45″W
- Area: 1.07 acres (0.43 ha)
- Built: 1866, 1879
- Architectural style: Italianate, Gothic
- NRHP reference No.: 12001259
- Added to NRHP: February 5, 2013

First Methodist Episcopal Church of St. Johnsville, also known as the United Methodist Church of St. Johnsville, is a historic Methodist Episcopal church located at St. Johnsville, Montgomery County, New York. The church was built in 1879, and is a one-story, Gothic Revival style brick building over a limestone block foundation. It has a slate gable roof and features a corner entrance tower and arched openings. The associated church parsonage or Lewis Snell House, was built in 1866. It is a 1 1/2-story, Italianate style brick dwelling with a low pitched hipped roof.

It was added to the National Register of Historic Places in 2013.
