= Timmerman Creek =

- Location of the mouth of Timmerman Creek Timmerman Creek (the United States)

Location
- Country: United States
- State: New York

Physical characteristics
- Mouth: Mohawk River
  - location: St. Johnsville, New York
  - coordinates: 42°59′34″N 74°41′54″W
  - elevation: 305 ft (93 m)
- Basin size: 16.6 sq mi (43 km^{2})

Timmerman Creek flows into the Mohawk River in St. Johnsville, New York.
