= Bridenbecker Creek =

- Location of the mouth within New York Bridenbecker Creek (the United States)

Location
- Country: United States
- State: New York
- County: Herkimer

Physical characteristics
- Source
  - coordinates: 43°04′48″N 75°01′59″W
- Mouth: Mohawk River
  - location: Frankfort
  - coordinates: 43°03′17″N 75°04′51″W

Bridenbecker Creek is a river in Herkimer County in the state of New York. It flows into the Mohawk River by Frankfort. Bridenbecker Creek is named after the Bridenbecker family who had a farm in the area in the 1800s.

== Water quality ==
Water in the Bridenbecker Creek watershed is moderately healthy.
