= Starch Factory Creek =

- Location of the mouth of Starch Factory Creek Starch Factory Creek (the United States)

Location
- Country: United States
- State: New York

Physical characteristics
- Mouth: Mohawk River
  - location: Utica, New York
  - coordinates: 43°05′47″N 75°11′05″W
  - elevation: 397 ft (121 m)
- Basin size: 7.06 mi^{2} (18.3 km^{2})

Starch Factory Creek flows into the Mohawk River in Utica, New York.
