= Knapp Brook =

- Location of the mouth within New York Knapp Brook (the United States)

Location
- Country: United States
- State: New York

Physical characteristics
- Mouth: Mohawk River
  - location: West Schuyler, New York
  - coordinates: 43°05′17″N 75°08′32″W
  - elevation: 384 ft (117 m)

Knapp Brook is a river that flows into the Mohawk River by West Schuyler, New York.

== Water quality ==
Streambank erosion on Knapp Brook contributes sediment loads into the Erie Canal. Periodic dredging to restore adequate canal navigational depth causes further siltation and affects fish habitat.
