= Margaret Reaney Memorial Library =

- U.S. National Register of Historic Places
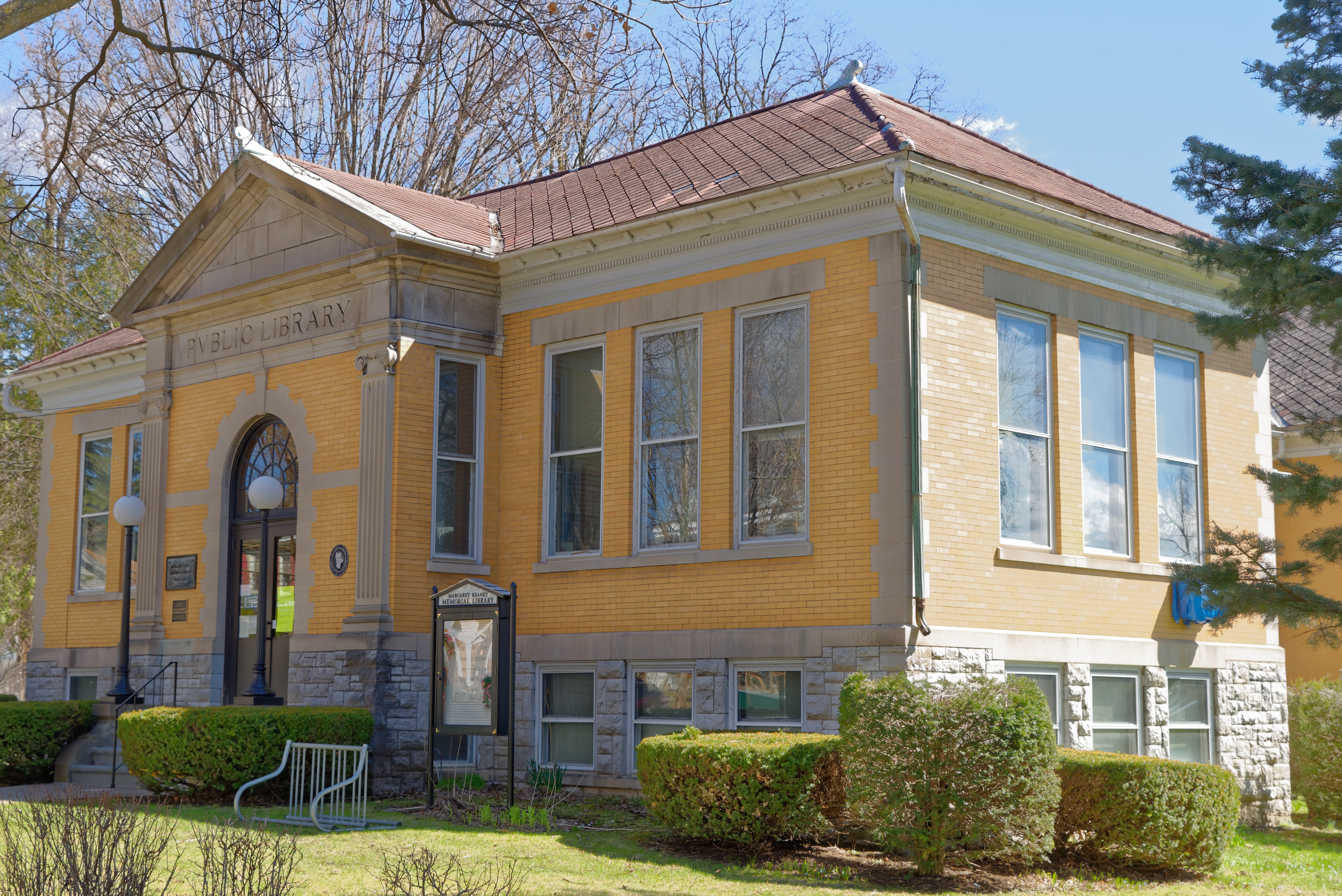
- The library in 2019

- Location within New York Location within the United States
- Location: 19 Kingsbury Ave., St. Johnsville, New York
- Coordinates: 42°59′49″N 74°40′38″W
- Area: 1.06 acres (0.43 ha)
- Built: 1909, 1936
- Built by: Everett, Edward
- Architect: Haug, Carl; Haug Fred
- Architectural style: Classical Revival
- NRHP reference No.: 12000210
- Added to NRHP: April 16, 2012

Margaret Reaney Memorial Library is a historic library building located at St. Johnsville, Montgomery County, New York. It is a one-story, Classical Revival style brick building over a raised basement. It consists of a cruciform plan main block constructed in 1909, and a 1936 "T"-plan addition. The front facade features a projecting entrance portico. The building is placed in the contributing Village Memorial Park with a Soldiers Monument (1937) and a Bronze Sculpture (1898) by Roland Hinton Perry (1870-1941).

It was added to the National Register of Historic Places in 2012.
