= Wheelers Creek =

- Location of the mouth of Wheelers Creek Wheelers Creek (the United States)

Location
- Country: United States
- State: New York

Physical characteristics
- Mouth: Mohawk River
  - location: Rome, New York
  - coordinates: 43°11′44″N 75°26′10″W
  - elevation: 419 ft (128 m)
- Basin size: 14.5 sq mi (38 km^{2})

Wheelers Creek flows into the Mohawk River in Rome, New York.
