= Reall Creek =

Location
- Country: United States
- State: New York

Physical characteristics
- Mouth: Mohawk River
  - location: Utica, New York
  - coordinates: 43°06′43″N 75°12′51″W
  - elevation: 402 ft (123 m)
- Length: 9 m (30 ft)
- Basin size: 8.91 mi^{2} (23.1 km^{2})

Reall Creek flows into the Mohawk River in Utica, New York Named for Christian Reall who built a cabin at the mouth where the creek empties into the Mohawk River. During the American Revolution Reall and other families were forced to leave their homes as a group of Torreys were setting fire to homes and lands of those who opposed the British Crown. Reall returned to the location and rebuilt his home after the war in what was known as Deerfield Corners now north Utica.
