= Stringer Brook =

- Location of the mouth within New York Stringer Brook (the United States)

Location
- Country: United States
- State: New York
- Region: Central New York
- County: Oneida

Physical characteristics
- Source
  - location: West-southwest of Alder Creek
  - coordinates: 43°24′03″N 75°16′44″W
- Mouth: Mohawk River
  - location: North Western
  - coordinates: 43°20′36″N 75°22′09″W
  - elevation: 604 ft (184 m)
- Basin size: 12.9 sq mi (33 km^{2})

Stringer Brook is a river in Oneida County in the state of New York. It begins west-southwest of Alder Creek and flows into the Mohawk River in North Western.
