= Decks Creek =

Creek in New York, United States

Location
- Country: United States
- State: New York

Physical characteristics
- Mouth: Mohawk River
  - location: Whitesboro, New York
  - coordinates: 43°08′25″N 75°17′14″W
  - elevation: 402 ft (123 m)
- Basin size: 2.87 mi^{2} (7.4 km^{2})

The Decks Creek flows into the Mohawk River in Whitesboro, New York.
