= Tannery Brook =

River in New York

Location
- Country: United States
- State: New York

Physical characteristics
- Mouth: Mohawk River
  - location: North Western, New York
  - coordinates: 43°19′44″N 75°21′37″W
  - elevation: 569 ft (173 m)
- Basin size: 1.87 mi^{2} (4.8 km^{2})

Tannery Brook flows into the Mohawk River in North Western, New York.
