= Deans Gulf =

- Location of the mouth of Deans Gulf Deans Gulf (the United States)

Location
- Country: United States
- State: New York

Physical characteristics
- Mouth: Mohawk River
  - location: Westernville, New York
  - coordinates: 43°18′48″N 75°22′56″W
  - elevation: 549 ft (167 m)
- Basin size: 2.25 sq mi (5.8 km^{2})

Deans Gulf flows into the Mohawk River in Westernville, New York.
