= Tribes Hill, New York =

- Census-designated place
- Location within New York Location within the United States
- Coordinates: 42°57′9″N 74°17′26″W
- Country: United States
- State: New York
- County: Montgomery
- Towns: Mohawk; Amsterdam

Area
  - Total: 2.41 sq mi (6.25 km^{2})
  - Land: 2.28 sq mi (5.90 km^{2})
  - Water: 0.14 sq mi (0.35 km^{2})
- Elevation: 420 ft (128 m)

Population (2020)
  - Total: 937
  - Density: 411.6/sq mi (158.91/km^{2})
- Time zone: UTC-5 (Eastern (EST))
  - Summer (DST): UTC-4 (EDT)
- ZIP Codes: 12177 (Tribes Hill); 12068 (Fonda)
- Area code: 518
- FIPS code: 36-75341
- GNIS feature ID: 0967803

Tribes Hill is a hamlet and census-designated place (CDP) in the towns of Mohawk (80%) and Amsterdam (20%), in Montgomery County, New York, United States. The population was 937 at the 2020 census, down from 1,003 in 2010.

== Name ==
One theory on the origin of the name is that it is based on the location having been a gathering spot for the Mohawk nation, the dominant Iroquois tribe in the area during colonial times.

== Geography ==
Tribes Hill is in northeastern Montgomery County, located at 42°57′9″N 74°17′26″W (42.952392, -74.290590). It is mainly in the southeast corner of the town of Mohawk, with a portion extending east into the southwest corner of the town of Amsterdam. It is bordered to the south by the Mohawk River, across which are the towns of Glen and Florida.

New York State Route 5 passes through the community, leading east 5 miles (8 km) to Amsterdam, the only city in Montgomery County, and west the same distance to Fonda, the Montgomery county seat.

According to the U.S. Census Bureau, the Tribes Hill CDP has a total area of 2.41 square miles (6.24 km^{2}), of which 2.28 square miles (5.91 km^{2}) are land and 0.14 square miles (0.36 km^{2}), or 5.60%, are water. The community sits on a hill overlooking the Mohawk River. Main Street (County Route 27) crosses the Mohawk at Lock 12 of the Erie Canal and continues south into the hamlet of Fort Hunter.

== Demographics ==
Historical population
Census	Pop.	Note	%±
1970	1,184		—
1980	1,202		1.5%
1990	1,060		−11.8%
2000	1,024		−3.4%
2010	1,003		−2.1%
2020	937		−6.6%
U.S. Decennial Census

As of the census of 2000, there were 1,024 people, 417 households, and 303 families residing in the CDP. The population density was 449.3 inhabitants per square mile (173.5/km^{2}). There were 436 housing units at an average density of 191.3 per square mile (73.9/km^{2}). The racial makeup of the CDP was 96.78% White, 0.78% African American, 0.78% Native American, 0.68% Asian, 0.10% from other races, and 0.88% from two or more races. Hispanic or Latino of any race were 0.88% of the population.

There were 417 households, out of which 27.3% had children under the age of 18 living with them, 58.0% were married couples living together, 10.8% had a female householder with no husband present, and 27.3% were non-families. 24.7% of all households were made up of individuals, and 11.8% had someone living alone who was 65 years of age or older. The average household size was 2.46 and the average family size was 2.89.

In the CDP, the population was spread out, with 21.9% under the age of 18, 5.9% from 18 to 24, 23.1% from 25 to 44, 29.1% from 45 to 64, and 20.0% who were 65 years of age or older. The median age was 44 years. For every 100 females, there were 89.6 males. For every 100 females age 18 and over, there were 87.4 males.

The median income for a household in the CDP was $36,587, and the median income for a family was $39,750. Males had a median income of $35,000 versus $26,875 for females. The per capita income for the CDP was $19,390. About 5.8% of families and 7.4% of the population were below the poverty line, including 10.6% of those under age 18 and 11.7% of those age 65 or over.
