= Collinsville Cemetery (New York) =

Historic cemetery in Lewis County, New York

- Photographed September 24, 2023
- Interactive map of Collinsville Cemetery

Details
- Established: 1810
- Location: 4061 East Road; Lewis County, New York
- Country: United States
- Coordinates: 43.626421°N 75.393887°W
- Type: Private
- Style: Lawn cemetery
- Size: 1.45 or 1.5 acres (0.59 or 0.61 hectares)
- No. of graves: 380 (March 2014)
- Find a Grave: Collinsville Cemetery
- Collinsville Cemetery
- U.S. National Register of Historic Places
- NRHP reference No.: 14000192
- Added to NRHP: May 7, 2014

Collinsville Cemetery is a 215–216-year-old cemetery in Lewis County, New York.

== Description ==
Collinsville Cemetery is at 4061 East Road, Lewis County, New York, near the settlement of West Turin. It measures 1.45 or 1.5 acres (0.59 or 0.61 ha) at 43.626421°N 75.393887°W. It is privately owned by Collinsville Cemetery, Inc.

Aligned approximately west-southwest to east-northeast, the front of the cemetery faces East Road, and is marked by a short dry stone wall with three gaps; the first and third openings in the wall are blocked by chain-link fencing, while the middle is filled by limestone steps (with "1884" carved in relief) into the cemetery. The rest of the cemetery perimeter is enclosed by barbed wire and maples. The cemetery lacks formal paths, and is covered with grass, large maple trees, and some overgrown brush around the graves.

As of March 2014, the cemetery was active and housed approximately 380 European–American graves, dating back to 1810, "often grouped by family".

== History ==
After the first New England settlers settled in Lyons Falls, New York, Collinsville Cemetery was established in 1810.

In 1917 or 1918, a formal board of directors was incorporated (Collinsville Cemetery Association), and they began transforming it into a lawn cemetery. This included removing 6 or 8 inches (150 or 200 mm) of earth to level the parcel; planting new grasses, shrubbery, and trees; repairing, resetting, and straightening all the tombstones; laying the 2-by-2 1/2-foot (0.61 by 0.76 m) east wall; and appointing a caretaker to maintain the property.

In March 2014, the New York State Office of Parks, Recreation and Historic Preservation (OPRHP) submitted a proposal to the National Register of Historic Places for Collinsville Cemetery; it was accepted on May 7, 2014, and assigned the reference number 14000192.

== Analysis ==
The OPRHP called Collinsville Cemetery "historically significant as an intact example of a settlement era cemetery" in the local area.
