= Fort Johnson, New York =

- Hamlet
- Location within New York Location within the United States
- Coordinates: 42°57′30″N 74°14′10″W
- Country: United States
- State: New York
- County: Montgomery
- Town: Amsterdam
- Dissolved: December 31, 2023

Area
  - Total: 0.85 sq mi (2.19 km^{2})
  - Land: 0.74 sq mi (1.92 km^{2})
  - Water: 0.11 sq mi (0.28 km^{2})
- Elevation: 308 ft (94 m)

Population (2020)
  - Total: 401
  - Density: 542.3/sq mi (209.38/km^{2})
- Time zone: UTC-5 (Eastern (EST))
  - Summer (DST): UTC-4 (EDT)
- ZIP Code: 12070
- Area code: 518
- FIPS code: 36-26880
- GNIS feature ID: 0950482

Fort Johnson (formerly known as Akin) is a hamlet and former village in Montgomery County, New York, United States. It is located on the north side of the Mohawk River in the town of Amsterdam. The population was 401 at the 2020 census, down from 490 in 2010.

== History ==
Around 1710, Palatine Germans began trying to settle here. Most were working in an English camp along the Hudson to pay back their passage by ship from London. In 1716, the Mohawk sold a portion of the land to Philip Groat (it is now in the eastern part of the town of Amsterdam). This part of New York was Mohawk territory for centuries before European colonization. In 1739, William Johnson, a British Army officer from Ireland and colonial administrator who had previously lived closer to Amsterdam, purchased land including the site of the village. He established a mill in 1744. The original name of the settlement was "Mount Johnson".

The community was the original seat of power of William Johnson before he moved on to found the city of Johnstown further west. He rose to become the British Superintendent of Indian Affairs in the northern colonies and was highly influential because of his strong relationships with the Iroquois, especially the Mohawk. His former home here is preserved as Old Fort Johnson. Johnson had Molly Brant, a Mohawk woman, as his longtime consort.

The village of Fort Johnson was officially incorporated in 1909. However, in November 2022, due to a lack of interest in participation in the government, villagers voted to dissolve the village effective December 31, 2023.

Old Fort Johnson was listed on the National Register of Historic Places in 1972.

== Geography ==
Fort Johnson is located in northeastern Montgomery County at 42°57′30″N 74°14′10″W (42.958303, -74.236018), in the western part of the town of Amsterdam. It is bordered to the east by the city of Amsterdam and to the south by the Mohawk River, across which is the town of Florida.

According to the U.S. Census Bureau, the village has a total area of 0.85 square miles (2.20 km^{2}), of which 0.74 square miles (1.92 km^{2}) are land and 0.11 square miles (0.28 km^{2}), or 12.75%, are water. Kayaderosseras Creek (of Montgomery County) joins the Mohawk River in the village. Pepper Island in the Mohawk River is south of the village.

New York State Route 5, an east-west highway, passes through the south part of the village, where it is joined by New York State Route 67, Fort Johnson Avenue. NY-5 leads southeast 2.5 miles (4.0 km) to the center of Amsterdam and west 8 miles (13 km) to Fonda, the Montgomery county seat, while NY-67 leads northwest eight miles to Johnstown.

== Demographics ==
Historical population
Census	Pop.	Note	%±
1910	600		—
1920	680		13.3%
1930	833		22.5%
1940	868		4.2%
1950	930		7.1%
1960	876		−5.8%
1970	711		−18.8%
1980	646		−9.1%
1990	615		−4.8%
2000	491		−20.2%
2010	490		−0.2%
2020	401		−18.2%
U.S. Decennial Census

As of the census of 2000, there were 491 people, 198 households, and 139 families residing in the village. The population density was 659.8 inhabitants per square mile (254.8/km^{2}). There were 220 housing units at an average density of 295.6 per square mile (114.1/km^{2}). The racial makeup of the village was 98.17% White, 0.61% African American, 0.20% Native American, and 1.02% from two or more races. Hispanic or Latino of any race were 2.04% of the population.

There were 198 households, out of which 30.3% had children under the age of 18 living with them, 54.5% were married couples living together, 10.1% had a female householder with no husband present, and 29.3% were non-families. 24.2% of all households were made up of individuals, and 9.6% had someone living alone who was 65 years of age or older. The average household size was 2.48 and the average family size was 2.89.

In the village, the population was spread out, with 22.0% under the age of 18, 6.7% from 18 to 24, 29.1% from 25 to 44, 25.5% from 45 to 64, and 16.7% who were 65 years of age or older. The median age was 40 years. For every 100 females, there were 92.5 males. For every 100 females age 18 and over, there were 89.6 males.

The median income for a household in the village was $37,639, and the median income for a family was $44,750. Males had a median income of $31,776 versus $22,813 for females. The per capita income for the village was $21,172. About 2.1% of families and 7.1% of the population were below the poverty line, including 2.1% of those under age 18 and 8.7% of those age 65 or over.

== See also ==
- Fort Johnson Volunteer Fire Company
