= Wood Creek (Mohawk River tributary) =

Location
- Country: United States
- State: New York

Physical characteristics
- Mouth: Mohawk River
  - location: West Schuyler, New York
  - coordinates: 43°05′37″N 75°09′29″W
  - elevation: 403 ft (123 m)
- Basin size: 3.33 sq mi (8.6 km^{2})

Wood Creek flows into the Mohawk River in West Schuyler, New York.
