= Fort Johnson Volunteer Fire Company =

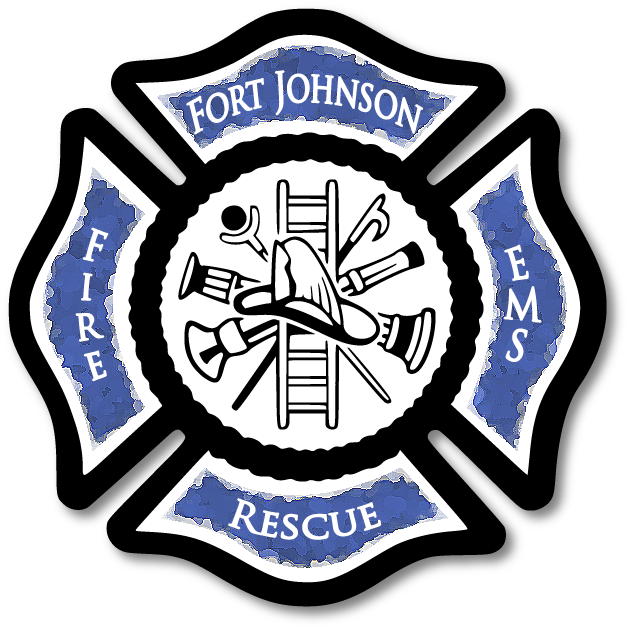

Operational area
- Country: United States
- State: New York
- Village: Fort Johnson

Agency overview
- Established: February 1935
- Employees: 25 (prior to disbanding)
- Annual budget: $284,549
- Staffing: Volunteer
- Fire chief: Jaime Sweezy
- EMS level: BLS First Response

Facilities and equipment
- Stations: 2
- Engines: 2
- Platforms: 1
- Rescues: 1
- Tenders: 2
- Wildland: 1 - type 6

Website
- Official website

The Fort Johnson Volunteer Fire Company was a volunteer fire department that provided fire protection and emergency medical services to Fort Johnson and Amsterdam New York. The fire department disbanded at the end of 2025, with fire protection and emergency medical services now provided by the Tribes Hill and Hagaman fire departments respectively.

== History ==
FJVFC was founded in 1935, and manages two stations.

In 1995, a fire erupted in the home of one of the department's volunteers. David Grandy, a lieutenant of the fire company, his wife Stephanie Grandy, also an active firefighter at the department, and their three children, were killed in the fire. A monument was dedicated to the Grandy family behind station 2 in Amsterdam.

In 2009, the fire company petitioned for a bill to allow non-resident members of their company, sponsored by Senator Hugh Farley. The bill passed in July 2009, making the FJVFC the 24th fire department in the state of NY to receive such an exemption.

In 2025, the Town of Amsterdam canceled its fire protection district contract with the Fort Johnson Fire Department, with the cancellation taking effect on December 31. Subsequently, the Fort Johnson Volunteer Fire Company disbanded on that day, ending its ninety-year history. Fire protection and emergency medical services were taken over by the Tribes Hill Fire Department and the Hagaman Fire Department, both also located in the Town of Amsterdam.

== Apparatus ==
The department has 9 trucks, including 2 fire engines, 2 tankers, 1 tower, 1 wildland fire engine, and 1 rescue. Their original engine from 1935 is still categorized as active, but is not used during emergencies. Both tankers come equipped with an engine, and hold 2,000 gallons of water.

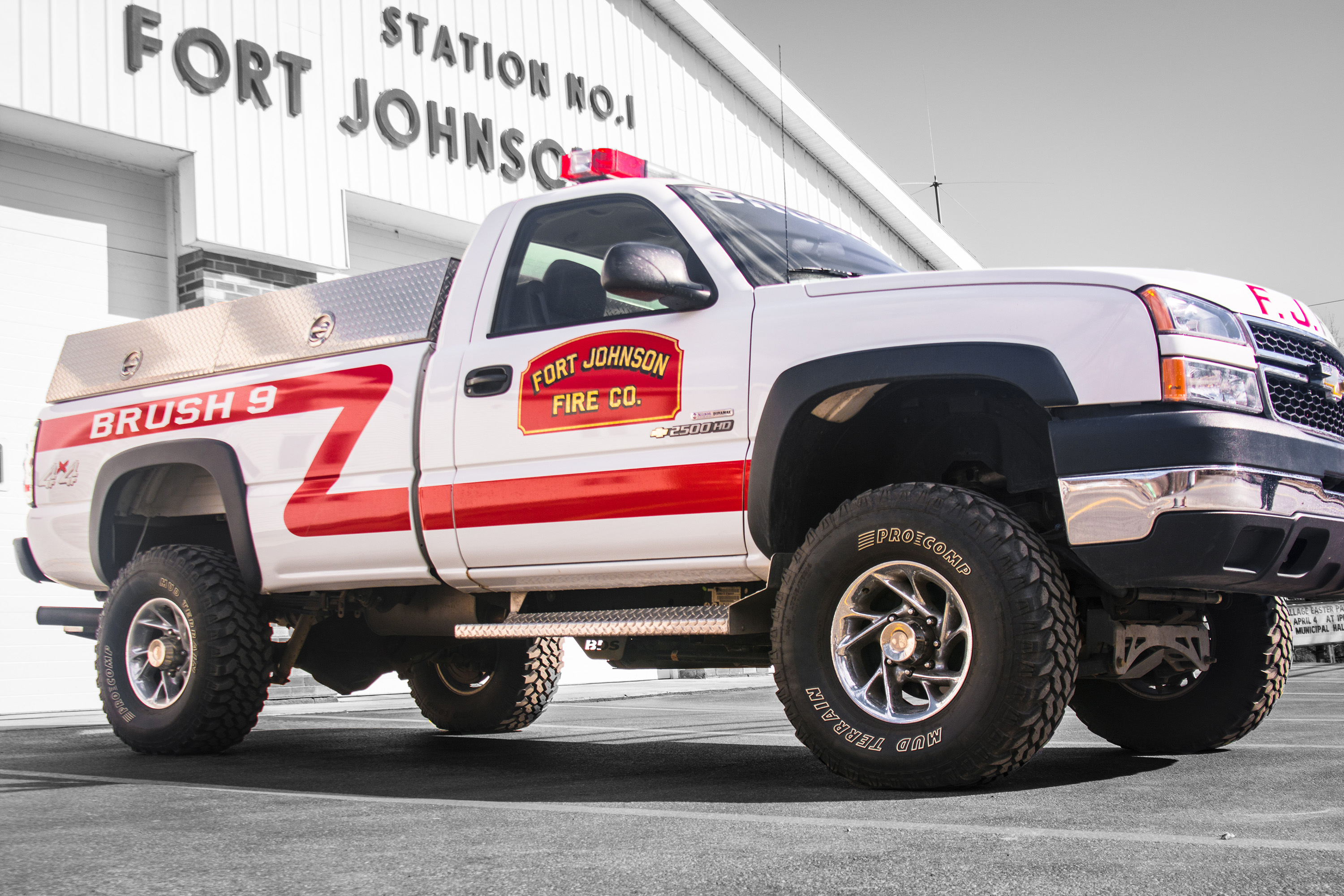

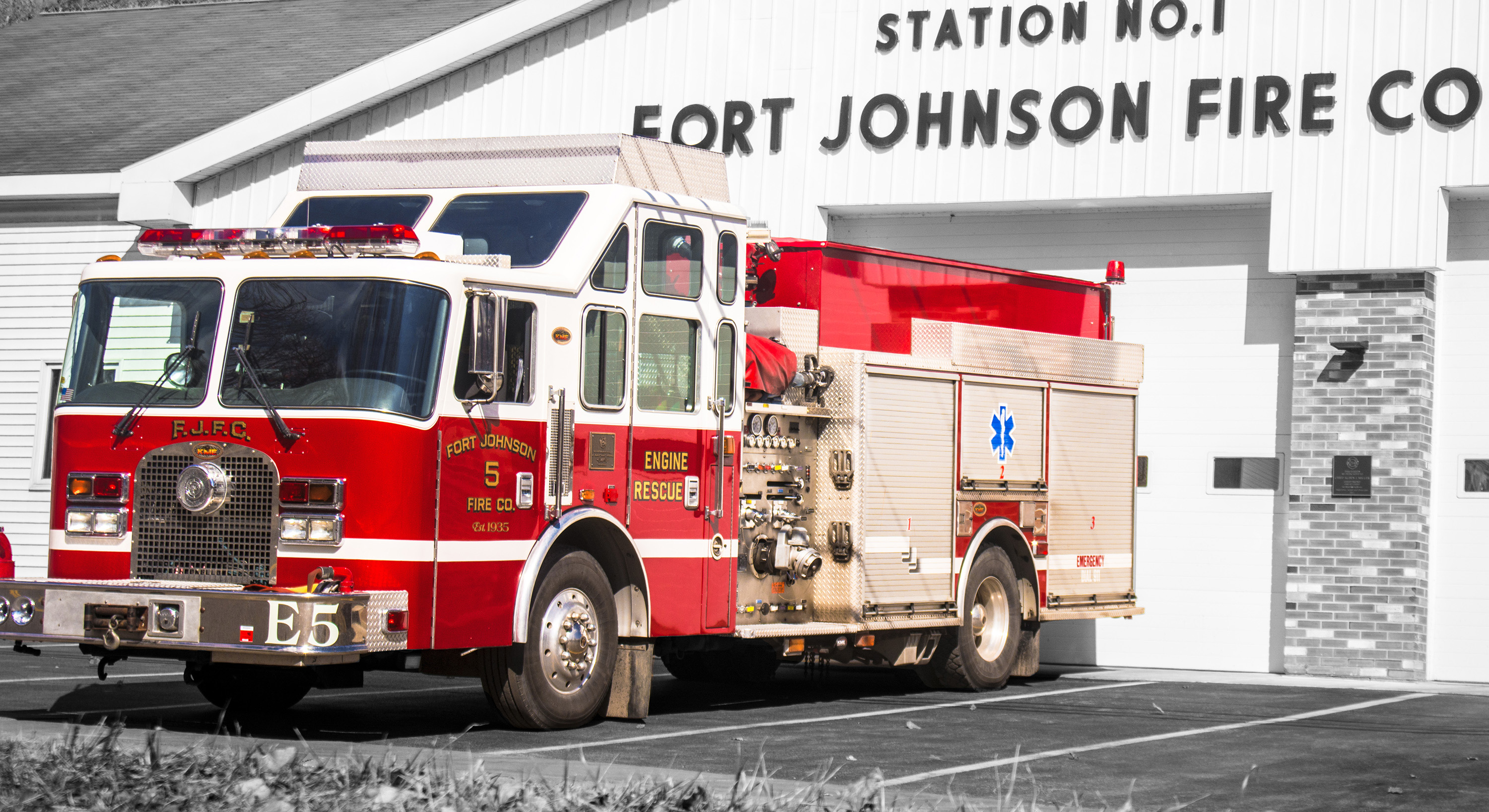

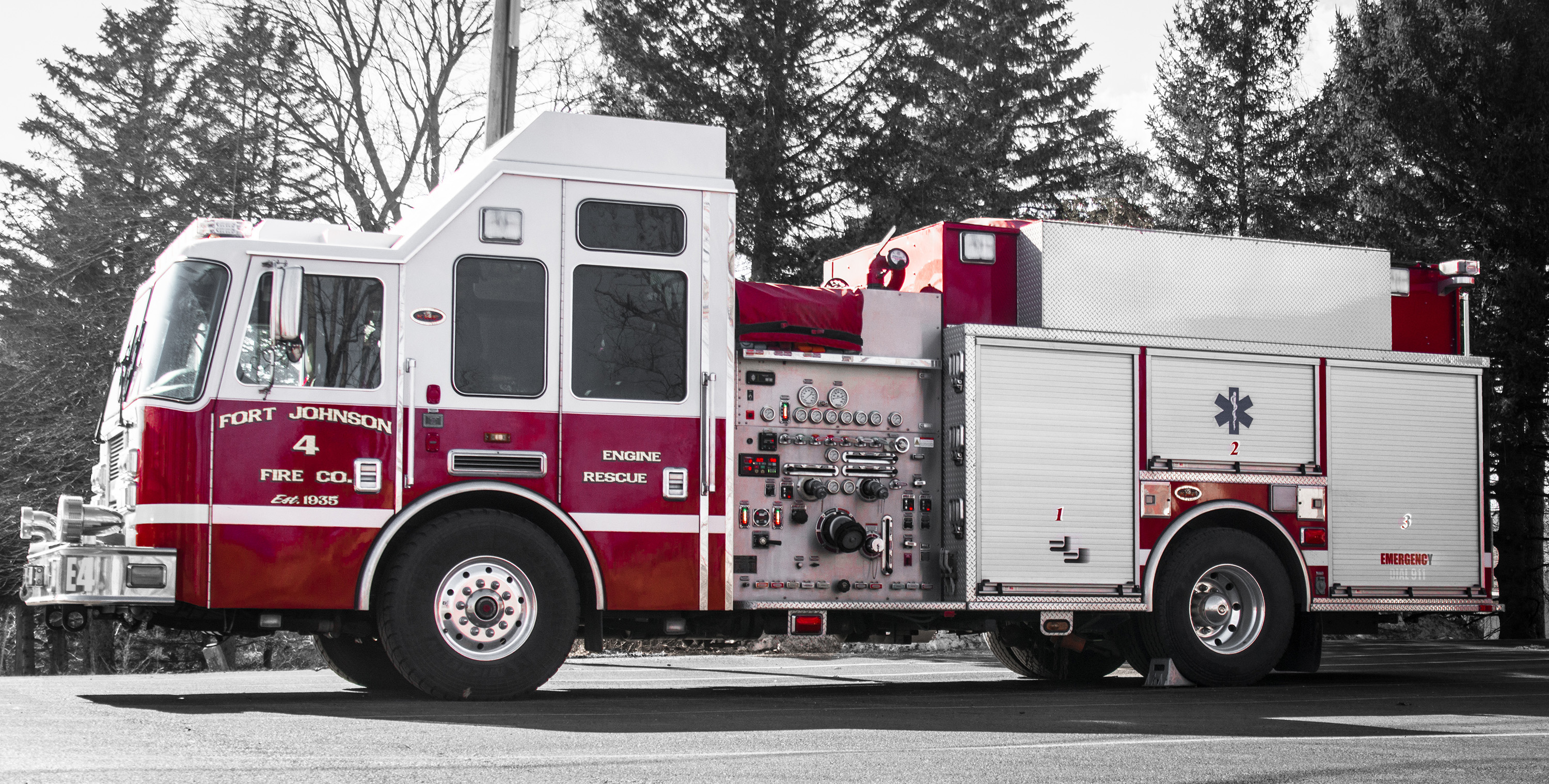

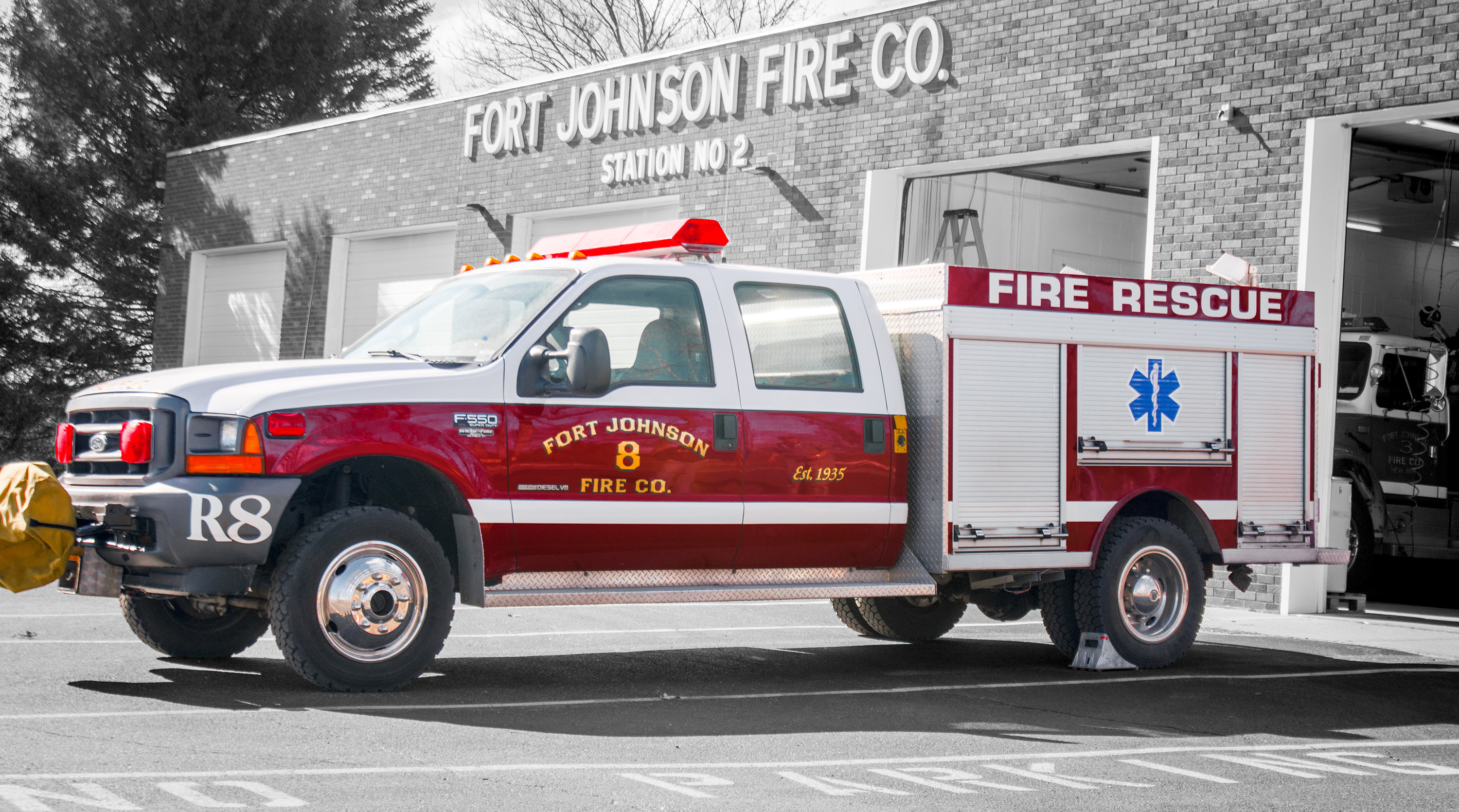

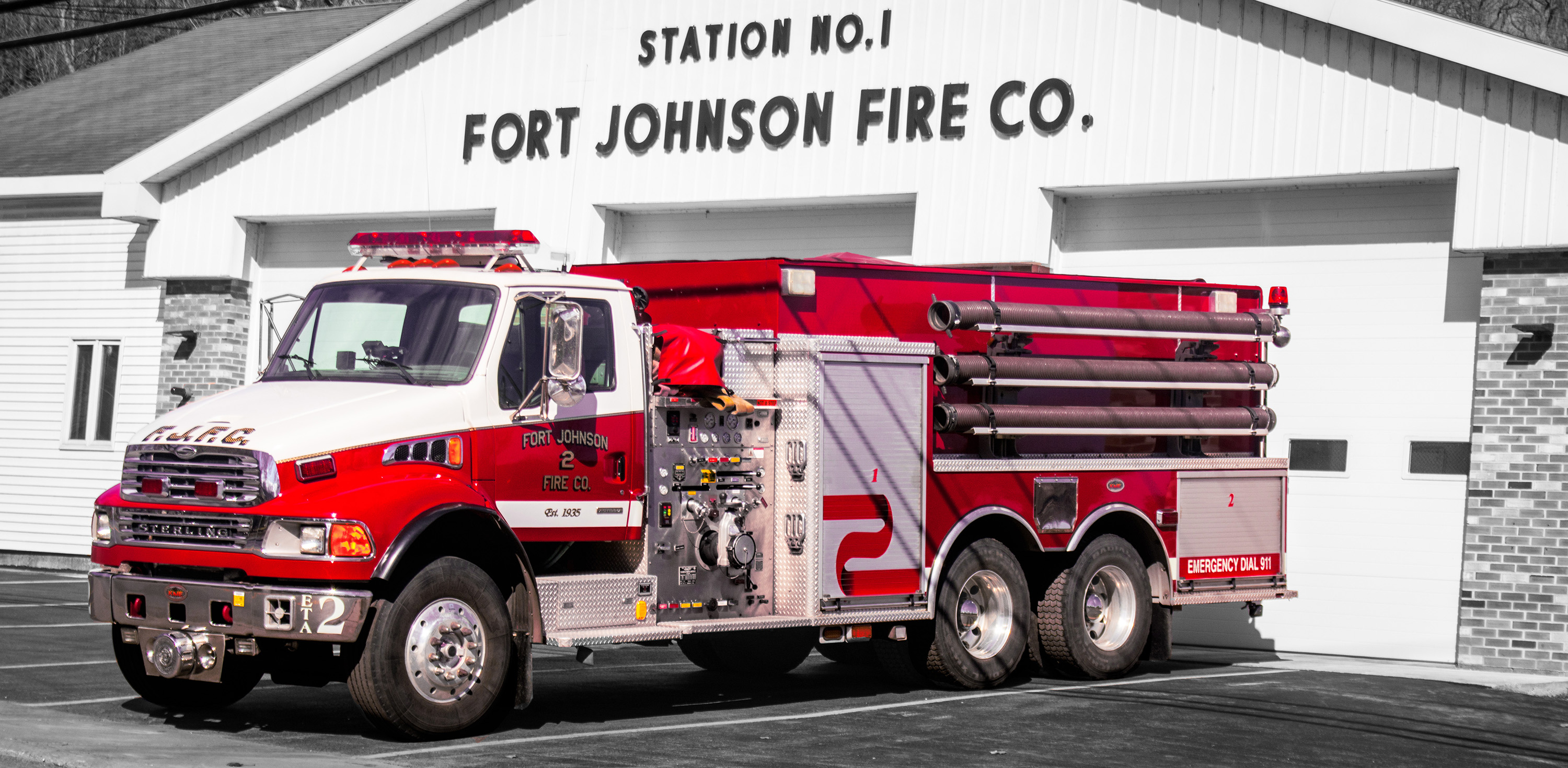

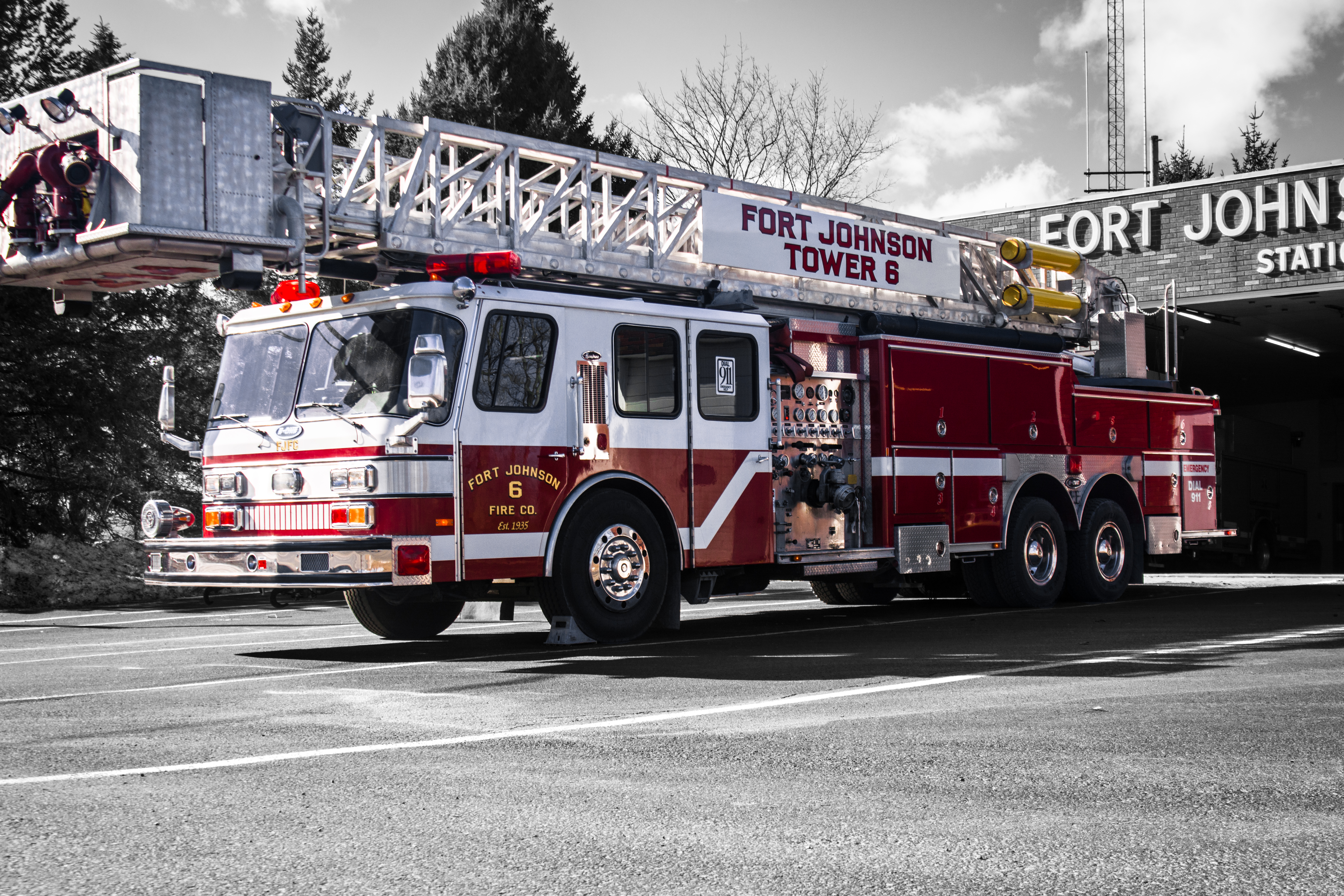

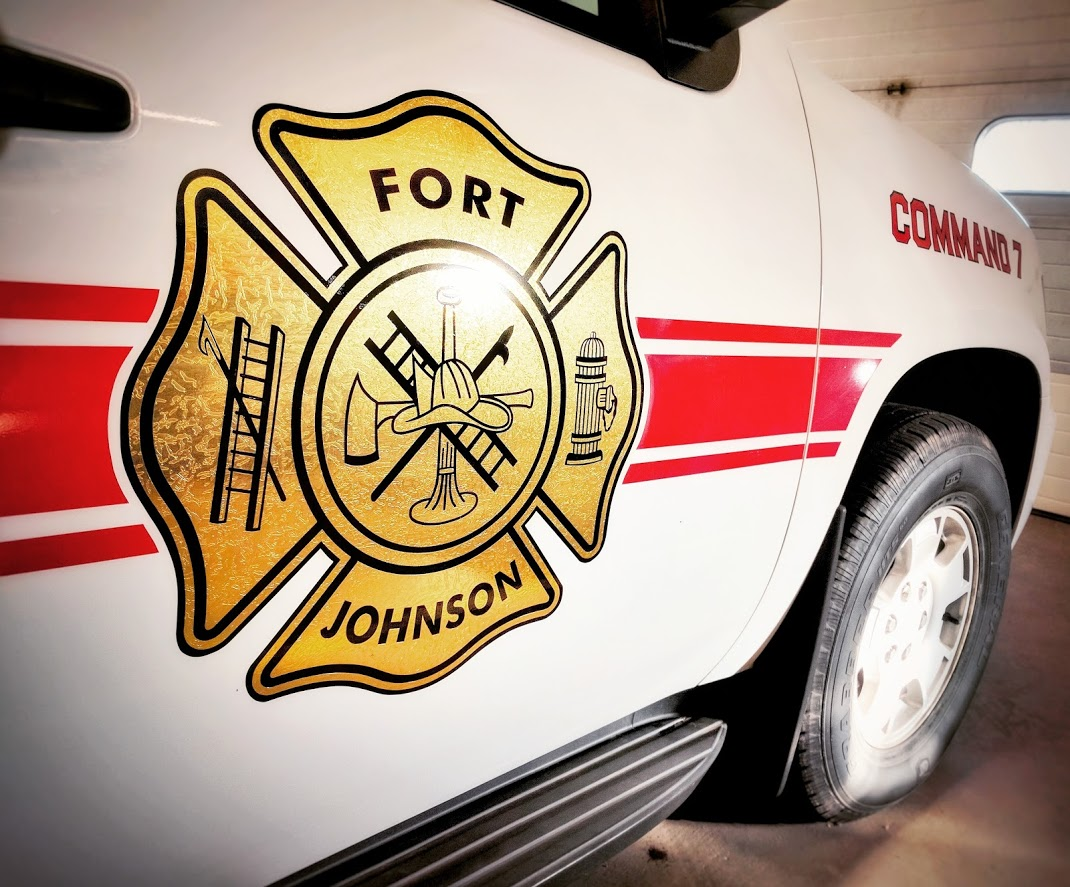
