= Samuel and Johanna Jones Farm =

- U.S. National Register of Historic Places
- Location within New York Location within the United States
- Nearest city: NY 67 W of jct. with NY 296, Amsterdam, New York
- Coordinates: 42°57′51″N 74°6′29″W
- Area: 106.2 acres (43.0 ha)
- Built: 1840
- Architectural style: Greek Revival
- NRHP reference No.: 93000460
- Added to NRHP: May 27, 1993

Samuel and Johanna Jones Farm is a historic home and farm complex located near Amsterdam in Montgomery County, New York. The farmhouse was built about 1840 and is in the Greek Revival style. It consists of a 2-story main block, three bays wide and three bays deep, with a 2-story rear wing. Attached is a 1 1/2-story "tee" wing, with a 1-story wing. It features an oriel window, covered wooden balconies, and porches. Also on the property are a cowbarn, milkshed, a chicken coop, a machine shed, and an outhouse.

It was added to the National Register of Historic Places in 1993.
