= West Turin, New York =

- Town
- Location within New York Location within the United States
- Coordinates: 43°35′0″N 75°27′49″W
- Country: United States
- State: New York
- County: Lewis

Area
  - Total: 102.40 sq mi (265.21 km^{2})
  - Land: 102.05 sq mi (264.32 km^{2})
  - Water: 0.34 sq mi (0.89 km^{2})
- Elevation: 1,857 ft (566 m)

Population (2010)
  - Total: 1,524
  - Estimate (2016): 1,515
  - Density: 14.8/sq mi (5.73/km^{2})
- Time zone: UTC-5 (Eastern (EST))
  - Summer (DST): UTC-4 (EDT)
- ZIP Codes: 13325 (Constableville); 13463 (Turin); 13368 (Lyons Falls); 13433 (Port Leyden); 13309 (Boonville)
- Area code: 315
- FIPS code: 36-049-81094
- GNIS feature ID: 979628
- Website: https://townofwestturin.gov/

West Turin is a town in Lewis County, New York, United States. The population was 1,524 at the 2010 census. The name is derived from its parent town, Turin. West Turin is in the south-central part of the county and is north of Rome.

== History ==
The town was first settled circa 1796, near Constableville. West Turin was formed from part of Turin in 1830 and was subsequently reduced in size by the formation of newer towns: Montague (1850) and Osceola (1844). The town of West Turin now includes the former town of Highmarket, which was disbanded in 1973. Highmarket had been set apart from West Turin in 1852.

== Geography ==
According to the United States Census Bureau, the town has a total area of 102.4 square miles (265 km^{2}), of which 102.1 square miles (264 km^{2}) are land and 0.3 square miles (0.78 km^{2}), or 0.33%, are water.

The Black River forms the eastern town line. West Turin is on the Tug Hill Plateau of northwestern New York.

New York State Route 26 and New York State Route 12D are north-south highways. New York State Route 12 is a north-south highway near the Black River.

=== Climate ===
West Turin has a warm-summer humid continental climate (Dfb). Winter is cold and very snowy, with most days not making it to freezing. Snow can fall anytime from October to May, and a consistent snowpack is expected from November to April. Due to its elevation, it is one of the coldest, snowiest, and wettest places in the state. Summer is warm during the day, but it cools off quickly at night. While West Turin is very wet year round, spring is the driest time of year with 3 to 5 inches (76 to 127 mm) of rain per month, while fall is the wettest time of year with 5 to 6 inches (130 to 150 mm) per month.

The highest recorded temperature was 94 °F (34 °C) on June 28, 2005, and August 10, 2001. The coldest recorded temperature was −40 °F (−40 °C) on January 25, 26 and 27 in 2004. The highest minimum temperature was 69 °F (21 °C) on July 18, 2005, July 19, 2013, and July 22, 2011. The lowest high on record was −15 °F (−26 °C) on January 16, 2004.

The low temperature falls below freezing on an average of 188.5 days per year, and it falls below 0 °F (−18 °C) on 36.5. The average lowest temperature in a year is −29.5 °F (−34 °C), putting West Turin in hardiness zone 4A. The high stays below freezing on an average of 81.1 days per year and exceeds 90 °F (32 °C) on 0.8 days per year.

Climate data for Highmarket, New York, 1991–2020 normals, extremes 2000–present
Month	Jan	Feb	Mar	Apr	May	Jun	Jul	Aug	Sep	Oct	Nov	Dec	Year
Record high °F (°C)	55 (13)	63 (17)	75 (24)	84 (29)	90 (32)	94 (34)	92 (33)	94 (34)	88 (31)	81 (27)	69 (21)	61 (16)	94 (34)
Mean maximum °F (°C)	47.3 (8.5)	45.9 (7.7)	55.5 (13.1)	73.0 (22.8)	83.5 (28.6)	86.1 (30.1)	88.2 (31.2)	85.7 (29.8)	83.4 (28.6)	72.4 (22.4)	61.6 (16.4)	50.1 (10.1)	89.5 (31.9)
Mean daily maximum °F (°C)	24.6 (−4.1)	27.6 (−2.4)	35.8 (2.1)	49.4 (9.7)	64.5 (18.1)	72.3 (22.4)	77.7 (25.4)	75.7 (24.3)	68.0 (20.0)	54.4 (12.4)	41.2 (5.1)	30.9 (−0.6)	51.8 (11.0)
Daily mean °F (°C)	14.1 (−9.9)	16.3 (−8.7)	24.6 (−4.1)	38.5 (3.6)	52.0 (11.1)	60.5 (15.8)	65.4 (18.6)	63.6 (17.6)	56.4 (13.6)	44.8 (7.1)	32.7 (0.4)	22.2 (−5.4)	40.9 (5.0)
Mean daily minimum °F (°C)	3.6 (−15.8)	4.9 (−15.1)	13.4 (−10.3)	27.6 (−2.4)	39.5 (4.2)	48.6 (9.2)	53.0 (11.7)	51.5 (10.8)	44.7 (7.1)	35.2 (1.8)	24.2 (−4.3)	13.4 (−10.3)	30.0 (−1.1)
Mean minimum °F (°C)	−25.9 (−32.2)	−20.3 (−29.1)	−14.5 (−25.8)	10.9 (−11.7)	24.7 (−4.1)	34.6 (1.4)	41.7 (5.4)	39.3 (4.1)	29.9 (−1.2)	19.6 (−6.9)	3.5 (−15.8)	−13.7 (−25.4)	−29.5 (−34.2)
Record low °F (°C)	−40 (−40)	−36 (−38)	−29 (−34)	−5 (−21)	18 (−8)	28 (−2)	35 (2)	34 (1)	20 (−7)	11 (−12)	−26 (−32)	−36 (−38)	−40 (−40)
Average precipitation inches (mm)	5.01 (127)	3.61 (92)	3.61 (92)	4.21 (107)	4.67 (119)	4.89 (124)	4.52 (115)	4.54 (115)	5.16 (131)	6.04 (153)	5.14 (131)	5.42 (138)	56.82 (1,444)
Average snowfall inches (cm)	54.8 (139)	43.8 (111)	25.1 (64)	6.1 (15)	0.3 (0.76)	0.0 (0.0)	0.0 (0.0)	0.0 (0.0)	0.0 (0.0)	2.6 (6.6)	19.3 (49)	51.1 (130)	203.1 (515.36)
Average extreme snow depth inches (cm)	26.2 (67)	29.2 (74)	26.9 (68)	11.1 (28)	0.1 (0.25)	0.0 (0.0)	0.0 (0.0)	0.0 (0.0)	0.0 (0.0)	1.6 (4.1)	9.5 (24)	21.5 (55)	34.9 (89)
Average precipitation days (≥ 0.01 in)	20.0	16.4	15.3	14.0	14.5	13.7	13.4	12.3	13.0	16.2	15.5	19.4	183.7
Average snowy days (≥ 0.1 in)	19.0	16.1	12.1	5.0	0.5	0.0	0.0	0.0	0.0	1.6	8.4	17.0	79.7
Source 1: NOAA
Source 2: National Weather Service (mean maxima/minima 2006–2020)

== Demographics ==
Historical population
Census	Pop.	Note	%±
1830	1,534		—
1840	2,042		33.1%
1850	3,793		85.7%
1860	2,410		−36.5%
1870	2,111		−12.4%
1880	2,006		−5.0%
1890	1,803		−10.1%
1900	1,779		−1.3%
1910	1,941		9.1%
1920	1,929		−0.6%
1930	1,886		−2.2%
1940	1,806		−4.2%
1950	1,781		−1.4%
1960	1,905		7.0%
1970	1,713		−10.1%
1980	1,867		9.0%
1990	1,753		−6.1%
2000	1,675		−4.4%
2010	1,524		−9.0%
2016 (est.)	1,515		−0.6%
U.S. Decennial Census

As of the census of 2000, there were 1,674 people, 635 households, and 433 families residing in the town. The population density was 16.4 inhabitants per square mile (6.3/km^{2}). There were 971 housing units at an average density of 9.5 per square mile (3.7/km^{2}). The racial makeup of the town was 99.22% White, 0.18% Native American, 0.06% Asian, 0.24% from other races, and 0.30% from two or more races. Hispanic or Latino of any race were 0.12% of the population.

There were 635 households, out of which 31.2% had children under the age of 18 living with them, 51.8% were married couples living together, 10.1% had a female householder with no husband present, and 31.7% were non-families. 25.8% of all households were made up of individuals, and 13.2% had someone living alone who was 65 years of age or older. The average household size was 2.64 and the average family size was 3.16.

In the town, the population was spread out, with 27.4% under the age of 18, 7.9% from 18 to 24, 27.7% from 25 to 44, 22.2% from 45 to 64, and 14.9% who were 65 years of age or older. The median age was 38 years. For every 100 females, there were 104.9 males. For every 100 females age 18 and over, there were 101.7 males.

The median income for a household in the town was $35,150, and the median income for a family was $41,618. Males had a median income of $32,065 versus $21,838 for females. The per capita income for the town was $15,538. About 13.5% of families and 16.4% of the population were below the poverty line, including 19.8% of those under age 18 and 13.8% of those age 65 or over.

== Communities and locations in West Turin ==
- Byron Corners – A location northwest of Mohawk Hill.
- Collinsville – A hamlet in the northeastern part of the town, west of Lyons Falls village on NY-12D. The name is from Homer Collins, an early settler. Collinsville Cemetery was listed on the National Register of Historic Places in 2014.
- Constableville – The village of Constableville is on NY-26 near the southeast town line.
- Fish Creek – A hamlet west of Mohawk Hill by the southwestern town line.
- High Market – A location north of Byron Corners.
- Lyons Falls – Part of the village of Lyons Falls is at the eastern town line and the Black River. The falls were formerly called the "High Falls".
- Michigan Mills – A hamlet in the western part of the town.
- Mohawk Hill – A hamlet in the southern part of the town on NY-26.
- Page – A location in the northwestern part of the town.
- Potters Corners – A location southwest of Collinsville at the junction of Routes NY-12D and NY-26.
