= Crum Creek (Mohawk River tributary) =

- Location of the mouth within New York Crum Creek (Mohawk River tributary) (the United States)
- Native name: Cathatachua

Location
- Country: United States
- State: New York
- County: Herkimer

Physical characteristics
- Source
  - location: North of Little Falls
  - coordinates: 43°05′19″N 74°51′34″W
  - elevation: Approximately 1,280 ft (390 m)
- Mouth: Mohawk River
  - location: East Creek
  - coordinates: 42°59′57″N 74°43′54″W
  - elevation: 305 ft (93 m)
- Basin size: 16.6 sq mi (43 km^{2})

Crum Creek, also known as Cathatachua Creek, is a river in Herkimer County in the state of New York. It begins north of Little Falls and flows in a generally southeast direction before flowing into the Mohawk River in the hamlet of East Creek.
