= Mother Creek =

Location
- Country: United States
- State: New York

Physical characteristics
- Mouth: Mohawk River
  - location: Palatine Church, New York
  - coordinates: 42°58′23″N 74°38′38″W
  - elevation: 305 ft (93 m)
- Basin size: 3.96 mi^{2} (10.3 km^{2})

Mother Creek flows into the Mohawk River in Palatine Church, New York.
