= Plotter Kill (Mohawk River tributary) =

River in United States

- Location of the mouth of Plotter Kill Plotter Kill (Mohawk River tributary) (the United States)

Location
- Country: United States
- State: New York

Physical characteristics
- Mouth: Mohawk River
  - location: Rotterdam Junction, New York
  - coordinates: 42°50′49″N 74°00′46″W
  - elevation: 226 ft (69 m)

Plotter Kill is a river that flows into the Mohawk River east of Rotterdam Junction, New York.
