= Degraff Creek =

Location
- Country: United States
- State: New York

Physical characteristics
- Mouth: Mohawk River
  - location: Amsterdam, New York
  - coordinates: 42°55′13″N 74°09′47″W
  - elevation: 253 ft (77 m)
- Basin size: 2.34 mi^{2} (6.1 km^{2})

Degraff Creek flows into the Mohawk River in Amsterdam, New York.
