= North Chuctanunda Creek =

Watercourse in the United States of America

- Location of the mouth within New York North Chuctanunda Creek (the United States)

Location
- Country: United States
- State: New York

Physical characteristics
- Mouth: Mohawk River
  - location: Amsterdam, New York
  - coordinates: 42°56′08″N 74°11′38″W
  - elevation: 262 ft (80 m)
- Basin size: 40.9 sq mi (106 km^{2})

North Chuctanunda Creek flows into the Mohawk River in Amsterdam, New York. Variant names include Chucttonaneda Creek, Jutalaga, North Chaughtanoonda Creek, North Chuctenunda Creek, and Ouctanunda Creek.
