= Mohawk Hill, New York =

- Hamlet
- Location within New York Location within the United States
- Coordinates: 43°31′29″N 75°28′11″W
- Country: United States
- State: New York
- County: Lewis
- Town: West Turin
- Elevation: 1,778 ft (542 m)
- Time zone: UTC-5 (Eastern (EST))
  - Summer (DST): UTC-4 (EDT)
- ZIP code: 13325 (Constableville)
- Area codes: 315 / 680

Mohawk Hill is a hamlet in the town of West Turin in Lewis County, New York, United States. It is located on New York State Route 26, southwest of the village of Constableville.
