= West Branch, New York =

West Branch
- Hamlet
- Location within New York Location within the United States
- Coordinates: 43°22′19″N 75°28′56″W
- Country: United States
- State: New York
- County: Oneida
- Town: Lee
- Elevation: 1,010 ft (308 m)
- Time zone: UTC-5 (Eastern (EST))
  - Summer (DST): UTC-4 (EDT)
- ZIP code: 13363
- Area code: 315

West Branch is a hamlet located in the Town of Lee in Oneida County, New York, United States. It is located on New York State Route 26.
