= Mohawk River =

River in the U.S. state of New York

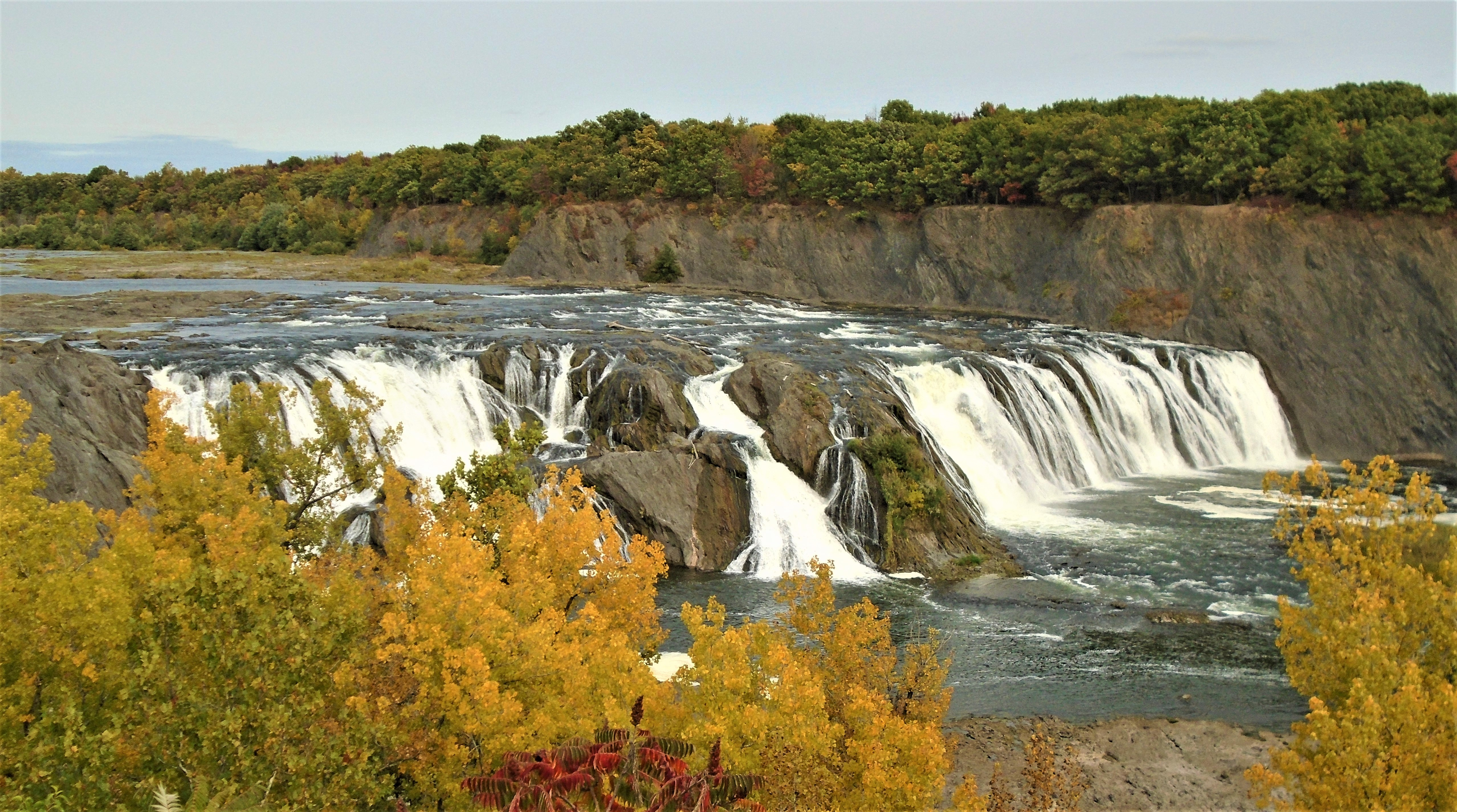
- Cohoes Falls, near the eastern end of the Mohawk River in Cohoes, New York

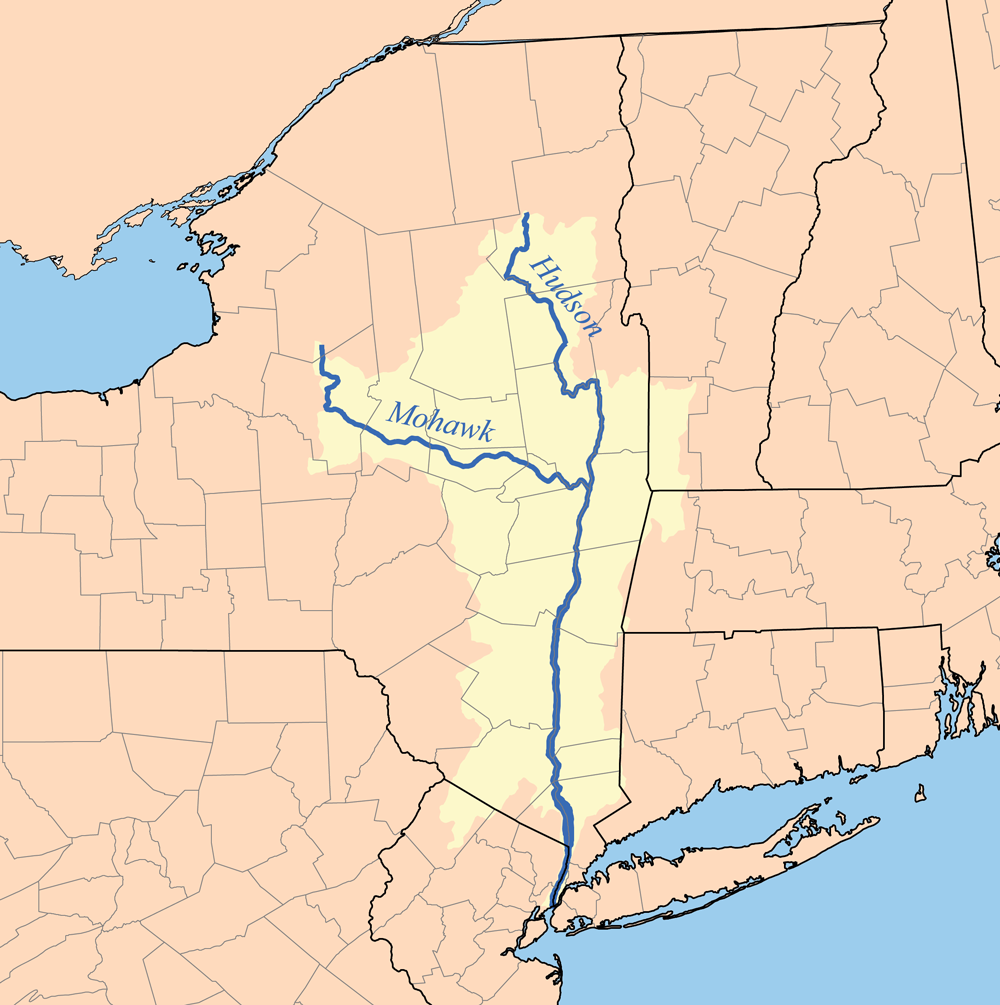
- Hudson River watershed map showing the Mohawk River
- Etymology: Named for Mohawk Nation
- Native name: Teionontatátie (Mohawk)

Location
- Country: United States
- State: New York
- Regions: Central New York, Capital Region
- Counties: Oneida, Herkimer, Montgomery, Schenectady, Albany, Rensselaer, Saratoga,
- Cities: Rome, Utica, Little Falls, Amsterdam, Schenectady, Cohoes

Physical characteristics
- Source: East Branch Mohawk River
  - location: S of Mohawk Hill
  - coordinates: 43°30′51″N 75°28′02″W
- 2nd source: West Branch Mohawk River
  - location: W of West Branch
  - coordinates: 43°22′12″N 75°30′29″W
- Source confluence
  - location: E of West Branch
  - coordinates: 43°22′16″N 75°28′6″W
  - elevation: 932 ft (284 m)
- Mouth: Hudson River
  - location: Border of Albany County, Saratoga County, and Rensselaer County, New York
  - coordinates: 42°45′39″N 73°41′13″W
  - elevation: 10 ft (3.0 m)
- Length: 149 mi (240 km)
- Basin size: 3,460 mi^{2} (9,000 km^{2})
- Discharge
  - location: Below Delta Dam
  - minimum: 15 cu ft/s (0.42 m^{3}/s)
  - maximum: 8,560 cu ft/s (242 m^{3}/s)
- Discharge
  - location: Cohoes
  - average: 5,908 cu ft/s (167.3 m^{3}/s)
  - minimum: 6 cu ft/s (0.17 m^{3}/s)
  - maximum: 200,000 cu ft/s (5,700 m^{3}/s)

Basin features
- River system: Hudson River
- Tributaries
  - left: Lansing Kill, West Canada Creek, East Canada Creek, Caroga Creek, North Chuctanunda Creek, Alplaus Kill
  - right: Oriskany Creek, Otsquago Creek, Canajoharie Creek, Schoharie Creek, Plotter Kill
- Waterfalls: Cohoes Falls

The Mohawk River is a 149-mile-long (240 km) river in the U.S. state of New York. It is the largest tributary of the Hudson River, flowing into it in Cohoes, a few miles north of the state capital of Albany. The river is named for the Mohawk Nation of the Haudenosaunee Confederacy. A significant portion of the river's valley served as the path of the Erie Canal, key to developing both New York state and the Great Lakes area. The Mohawk's largest tributary, the Schoharie Creek, accounts for over one quarter (26.83%) of the river's watershed, with West Canada Creek contributing another 16.33% of total.

== Course ==
The river's source is at the confluence of the West Branch Mohawk River and East Branch Mohawk River in north-central Oneida County. It begins flowing generally southeastward towards the Hamlet of Hillside, first receiving Blue Brook then McMullen Brook and Haynes Brook. In Hillside is the confluence of Lansing Kill, after which it flows towards the Hamlet of North Western receiving Stringer Brook along the way. After North Western it receives Tannery Brook then Wells Creek in the Hamlet of Frenchville. At Frenchville it curves to the southwest and heads toward the Hamlet of Westernville receiving Deans Gulf along the way. In Westernville it enters Delta Reservoir. After exiting the reservoir it heads south toward the City of Rome receiving Hurlbut Glen Brook and passing the Rome Fish Hatchery along the way. On the south side of the City it enters the Erie Canal and begins to flow east.

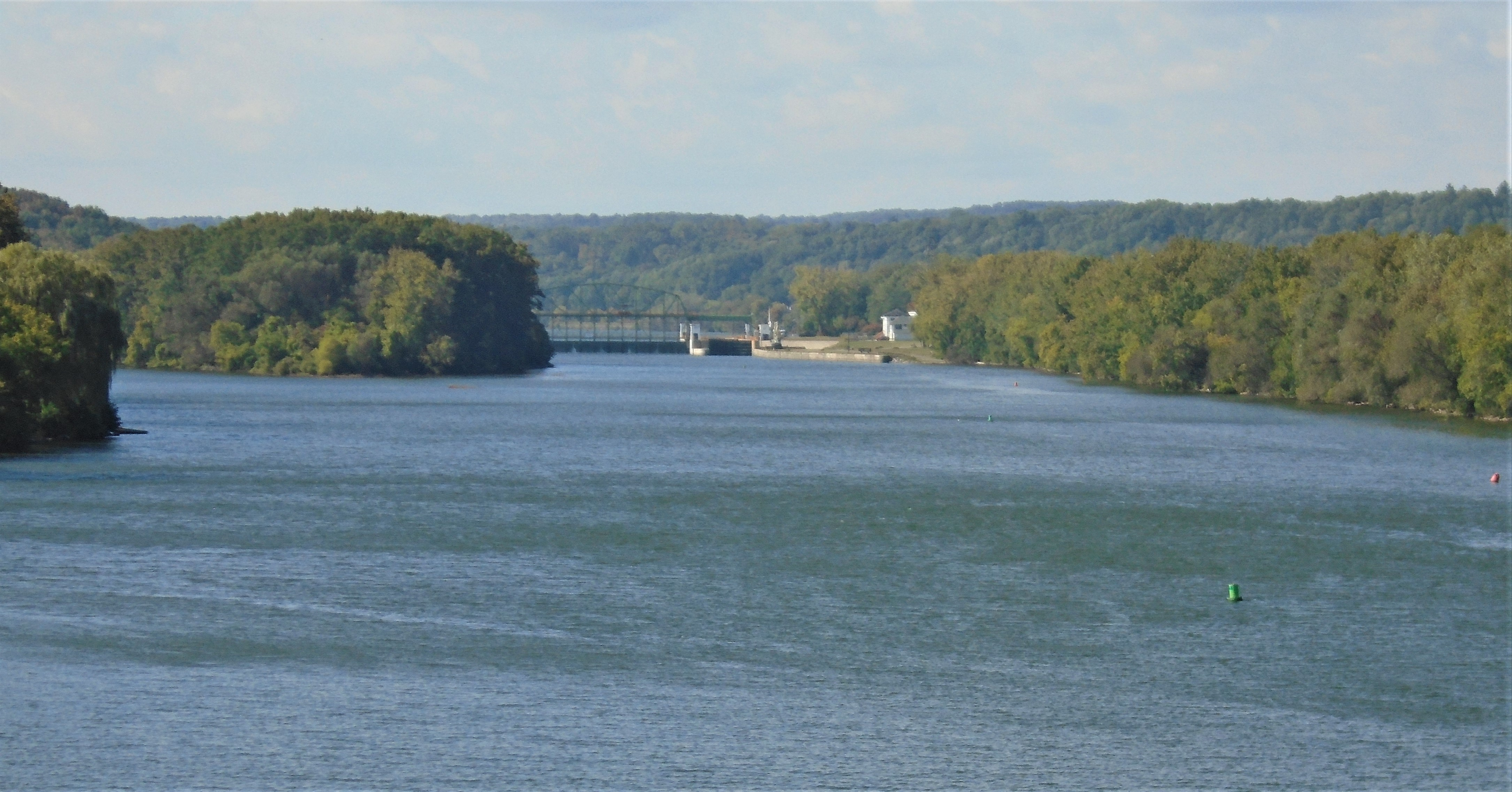
Mohawk River at confluence of South Chuctanunda Creek

After Rome the river flows generally east through the Mohawk Valley, passing by the cities of Utica, Little Falls, Canajoharie, Amsterdam, and Schenectady before entering the Hudson River at Cohoes, just north of Albany.

=== Modifications ===
The river and its supporting canal, the Erie Canal, connect the Hudson River and port of New York with the Great Lakes at Buffalo, New York. The lower part of the Mohawk River has five permanent dams, nine movable dams (seasonal), and five active hydropower plants.

Schoharie Creek and West Canada Creek are the principal tributaries of the Mohawk River. Both of these tributaries have several significant dams including the Hinckley Dam on the West Canada and the Gilboa Dam on the upper reaches of Schoharie Creek. The Gilboa Dam, which was completed in 1926 as part of the New York City water supply system, is the subject of an active and aggressive rehabilitation project.

== Geology ==
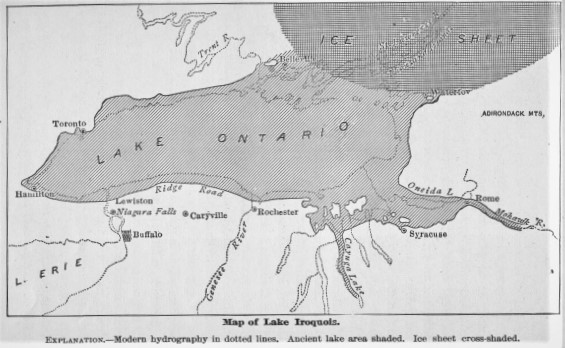
As the Laurentian Glacier retreated, it blocked the outflow of Glacial Lake Iroquois. Instead of flowing down the St Lawrence Valley it flowed down the Mohawk River.

The Mohawk Valley (center-right), runs east and west, cutting a natural path between the Catskill Mountains to the south and the Adirondack Mountains to the north.

The Mohawk watershed drains a large section of the Catskill Mountains, the Mohawk Valley proper, and a section of the southern Adirondack Mountains. All three regions have distinct bedrock geology, and the underlying rocks become progressively younger to the south. Overall, this part of New York is represented by lower Paleozoic sedimentary rocks that unconformably overlie the Grenville-aged (Proterozoic, here about 1.1 billion years old) metamorphic rocks of the Adirondacks. In the watershed, these rocks are only significant in the headwaters of the West Canada Creek. Much of the main trunk of the Mohawk River sits in Cambro-Ordovician carbonates (limestone) and Middle Ordovician sandstones and shales. The southern tributaries (Catskill Mountains) are underlain by a thin sequence of Devonian limestones that are overlain by a thick sequence of sandstones and shale of the Catskill Delta, which is also Devonian in age.

During the Pleistocene (c. 1.8 to 0.01 mya), the watershed was extensively modified by continental glaciation. As a result of glacial scour and deposition, the surficial deposits in much of the watershed are poorly sorted boulder- and clay-rich glacial till. During deglaciation, several glacial lakes left varved clay deposits. In the final stages of deglaciation, approximately 13,350 years ago, the catastrophic draining of Glacial Lake Iroquois, a pro-glacial lake, was through what would become the modern Mohawk Valley. In this final phase, the enormous discharge of water caused local deep scour features (e.g. the Potholes at Little Falls), and extensive sand and gravel deposition, which is one of the key sources of municipal groundwater including the Scotia Delta, which is also known as the Great Flats Aquifer.

== Etymology ==
The river is named for the Mohawk Nation of the Haudenosaunee Confederacy. In the 1700s and before, the Mohawk people, a section of the Haudenosaunee Confederacy, were based in the Mohawk Valley. Their territory ranged north to the St. Lawrence River, southern Quebec and eastern Ontario; south to greater New Jersey and into Pennsylvania; eastward to the Green Mountains of Vermont; and westward to the border with the Haudenosaunee Oneida Nation's traditional homeland territory.

== History ==
The river has long been important to transportation and migration to the west as a passage through the Appalachian Mountains, between the Catskill Mountains and Allegheny Plateau to the south and the Adirondack Mountains to the north. The Mohawk Valley allowed easier passage than going over the mountains to the north or south of the valley. As a result, it was strategically important during the French and Indian War and the American Revolutionary War, and a number of important battles were fought here. The fertile Mohawk Valley also attracted early settlers.

The river was the highway of the native Mohawk people. The Mohawk name for the river is Teionontatátie, "a river flowing through a mountain" (or Yeionontatátie, "going round a mountain").

The first recorded European exploration of the Mohawk was a trip by the Dutchman Harman Meyndertsz van den Bogaert in 1634. He followed the river upstream from Albany for a distance of 100 miles, including all the territory of the Mohawks.

In 1661 Dutch colonists founded the city of Schenectady on the Mohawk River approximately 19 miles (31 km) from Albany. "For fifty years Schenectady was the outpost of civilization and Dutch-English rule in the Mohawk valley."

In 1712 the British, now in control of New York, built Fort Hunter at the confluence of the Mohawk and the Schoharie Creek, about 22 miles (35 km) upriver from Schenectady. Around 600 Palatine Germans were settled along the Mohawk and Schoharie Creek. Swedish explorer and botanist, Pehr Kalm, visited the area along the river in the mid-18th century where he encountered some of the indigenous peoples belonging to the Haudenosaunee Confederacy, and recorded some of their customs in his journal.

In the early nineteenth century water transport was a vital means of transporting both people and goods. A corporation was formed to build the Erie Canal along the Mohawk River to Lake Erie. Its construction simplified and reduced the difficulties of European westward settler migration and encouraged Manifest Destiny.

Later in the 19th century railroads followed the Water Level Route along the Mohawk Valley, and in the 20th major east–west roads such as Route 5 and a limited-access superhighway, the New York State Thruway (later coterminous with Interstate 90), were built in the valley.

The Mohawk River Heritage Corridor Commission was created to preserve and promote the natural and historic assets of the Mohawk River. This commission was created by the NY State Legislature in 1997 to improve historic preservation along the river.

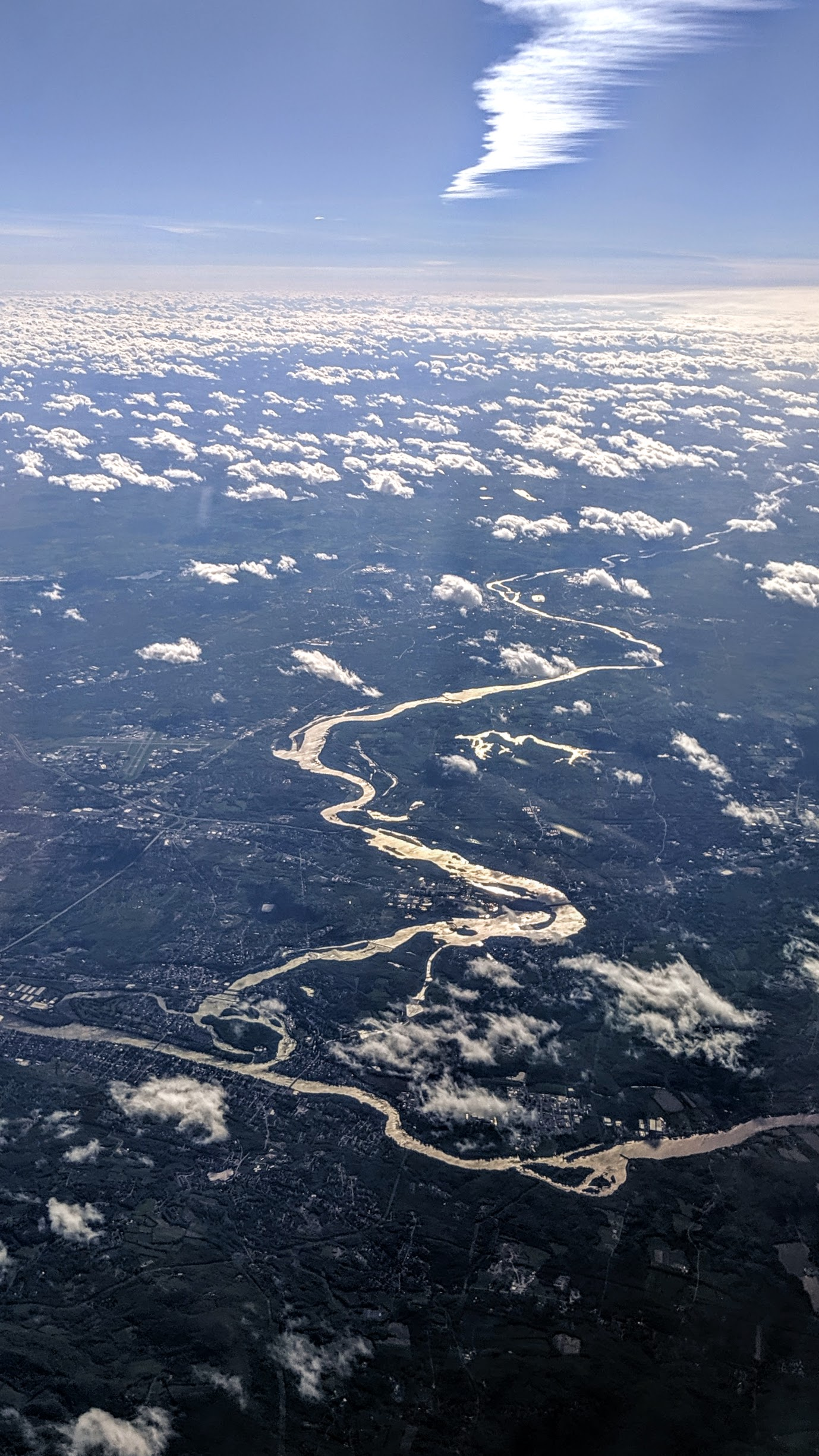
Aerial view of the Mohawk River, with Troy and the Hudson River in the foreground, and Schenectady in the background

== Flooding and discharge ==
The Mohawk River has a relatively long record of flooding that has been documented back to settlement in the 17th century. The average volume of water that flows through the Mohawk is about 184 billion cubic feet (5.21 km^{3}) every year. Much of the water flows through the watershed in the spring as snow melts rapidly and enters the tributaries and the main trunk of the river. The maximum average daily flow on the river occurs between late March and early April. For the period between 1917 and 2000, the highest mean daily flow is c. 18,000 cu ft (510 m^{3}) as measured at Cohoes, near the confluence with the Hudson. The lowest mean daily flow of 1,400 cu ft (40 m^{3}) occurs in late August. There is a long record of significant and damaging floods along the entire length of the river.

Because the river and its tributaries typically freeze in the winter, the spring melt is commonly accompanied by ice floes that get stuck and jammed along the main trunk of the river. This annual spring breakup typically occurs in the last few weeks of March, although there are numerous floods that have occurred before or after this time, such as in 2018 when the ice jam breakup happened in late February after record warm weather in the region. These ice jams can cause considerable damage to structures along the riverbanks and on the floodplain. The most severe flood of record on the main trunk of the Mohawk River was the spring breakup flood that occurred from 27 to 28 March 1914. This flood caused a tremendous amount of damage to the infrastructure because it was a spring breakup flood with enormous amounts of ice. Ice jams of some significance occur about every other year.

One major flood on the Mohawk was on 26–29 June 2006, during the Mid-Atlantic United States flood of 2006. Flooding was caused by a stalled frontal system that resulted in 50 to 330 millimeters (2.0 to 13.0 in) of rain across central New York and widespread flooding occurred in the Mohawk, Delaware, and Susquehanna watersheds. Across the state, this event caused over $227 million in damage and resulted in the loss of four lives. This flooding was acute in the upper parts of the Mohawk watershed.

The Mohawk River also saw significant flooding during the weeks between August 21, 2011, and September 5, 2011, due to torrential rains experienced from Hurricane Irene and Tropical Storm Lee. Many of the Mohawk Barge Canal locks sustained major damage, especially near Waterford and Rotterdam Junction.

Another major flood was on June 28, 2013. It was caused by heavy rain that had fallen in the region for weeks. On the night of June 27, 2013, the Jordanville area reported that 4 inches of rain fell in one hour. The next day, the Mohawk River flooded the valley, residents were stranded and without power for about a week. There was considerable damage everywhere, especially Mohawk and Fort Plain.

On July 3, 1985, Congress approved a project at Amsterdam for work to be done on the Mohawk River and South Chuctanunda Creek. The creek was cleared at the upstream end of the project for approximately 950 feet (290 m). New flood walls were installed along the right bank of the creek and the Mohawk River. A new wing wall was installed on the left bank of the creek at the upstream end of the New York Central Railroad Bridge. The creek was realigned and reshaped for approximately 1,056 feet (322 m) and riprap was added where needed. The existing channel of the creek was slightly reshaped downstream of the Florida Avenue bridge. Construction plans for the project were issued on November 15, 1962. Construction work began on February 25, 1963, with construction being completed on June 4, 1965. The flood walls protect the city of Amsterdam from floods of 122,500 cu ft/s (3,470 m^{3}/s) from the Mohawk River and floods of 3,400 cu ft/s (96 m^{3}/s) from the creek. The floodwalls were able to prevent $13.6 million in damages from tropical storms Lee and Irene. In July 2012, governor Cuomo announced a project to improve the flood walls on the creek and Mohawk River. The floodwalls and river banks were repaired at a cost of $164,248.

== Watershed management ==
Historically, the Mohawk watershed has lacked a watershed management plan typical in many adjacent basins. In 2010, the New York State Department of Environmental Conservation released the Mohawk River Basin Action Agenda, which is the first framework for a watershed management plan in this basin. This plan identifies five priority goals for the Mohawk River Basin that are designed to enhance ecosystem health and the vitality of the region. The Action Agenda, developed by the NYS DEC in collaboration with a number of stakeholders in the basin with public input, advocates an ecosystem-based approach to watershed management. In October 2014, Riverkeeper, an environmental advocacy and clean water watchdog organization, announced that they will be expanding the reach of their efforts from the Hudson River to the Mohawk as well.

== Tributaries ==
=== Right ===
- McMullen Brook
- Deans Gulf
- Wheelers Creek
- Oriskany Creek
- Sauquoit Creek
- Starch Factory Creek
- Bonny Brook
- Moyer Creek
- Steele Creek
- Fulmer Creek
- Nowadaga Creek
- Otsquago Creek
- Canajoharie Creek
- Flat Creek
- Lasher Creek
- Yatesville Creek
- Van Wie Creek
- Auries Creek
- Schoharie Creek
- South Chuctanunda Creek
- Terwilleger Creek
- Sandsea Kill
- Moccasin Kill
- Plotter Kill
- Lisha Kill
- Shakers Creek
- Delphus Kill

=== Left ===
- Blue Brook
- Haynes Brook
- Lansing Kill
- Stringer Brook
- Tannery Brook
- Wells Creek
- Hurlbut Glen Brook
- Sixmile Creek
- Ninemile Creek
- Crane Creek
- Decks Creek
- Jones Creek
- Gridley Creek
- Reall Creek
- Budlong Creek
- Wood Creek
- Knapp Brook
- Burch Creek
- Sterling Creek
- Pratt Creek
- Bridenbecker Creek
- West Canada Creek
- Beaver Brook
- Crum Creek
- East Canada Creek
- Timmerman Creek
- Zimmerman Creek
- Mother Creek
- Caroga Creek
- Knauderack Creek
- Briggs Run
- Cayadutta Creek
- Danascara Creek
- Kayaderosseras Creek
- Dove Creek
- Bunn Creek
- North Chuctanunda Creek
- Degraff Creek
- Evas Kill
- Compaanen Kill
- Chaughtanoonda Creek
- Verf Kill
- Washout Creek
- Alplaus Kill
- Stony Creek

== Islands ==
- Abeel Island – Located north of Fort Plain.
- Bronson Island – Located west of Amsterdam.
- Davey Island – Located South of Amsterdam.
- Dalys Island – Located by Scotia.
- Giording Island – Located south of Amsterdam.
- Goat Island – Located north of Niskayuna.
- Isle of the Oneidas – Located south of Scotia.
- Isle of the Onondagas – Located south of Scotia.
- Isle of the Senecas – Located south of Scotia.
- Isle of the Mohawks – Located south of Scotia.
- Isle of the Cayugas – Located south of Scotia.
- Upper Pepper Island – Located south of Fort Johnson.
- Pepper Island – Located south of Fort Johnson.
- Robb Island – Located southeast of Fort Johnson.
- Swart Island – Located west of Hoffmans.

== See also ==
- List of rivers of New York
- Oneida Carry
- Great Flats Nature Trail
