= Charleston, New York =

Town in Montgomery County, NY

- Town
- Location in Montgomery County and the state of New York
- Coordinates: 42°48′53″N 74°20′38″W
- Country: United States
- State: New York
- County: Montgomery

Government
  - Type: Town Council
  - Town Supervisor: Robert Sullivan (C)
  - Town Council: Members' List: • Mary Summerfield (R); • Charles McMullen (D); • Robert S. Sullivan (D); • Jeffery T. Bivins (R)

Area
  - Total: 42.87 sq mi (111.02 km^{2})
  - Land: 42.01 sq mi (108.80 km^{2})
  - Water: 0.86 sq mi (2.22 km^{2})
- Elevation: 1,250 ft (381 m)

Population (2020)
  - Total: 1,355
  - Density: 32.3/sq mi (12.5/km^{2})
- Time zone: UTC-5 (Eastern (EST))
  - Summer (DST): UTC-4 (EDT)
- ZIP Codes: 12010 (Amsterdam); 12066 (Esperance); 12072 (Fultonville); 12166 (Sprakers)
- FIPS code: 36-057-13816
- GNIS feature ID: 0978810
- Website: https://www.nytownofcharleston.gov/

Charleston is a town in Montgomery County, New York, United States. The population was 1,355 at the 2020 census. The town was named for Charles Van Epps, an early settler.

Charleston is on the southern border of the county and is southwest of the city of Amsterdam. Charleston is the only town in the county not bordering the Mohawk River.

== History ==
Parts of Charleston were in Corry's Patent (1737), Stone Heap Patent (1770), and Thomas Machin's Patent (1787). Settlers began arriving before the American Revolution.

The Town of Charleston was formed by a division of the original "Town of Mohawk" in 1793. This division, which also created the town of Florida, terminated Mohawk as a town until another town with that name was created in 1837. Charleston was reduced in size in 1823, when the towns of Glen and Root (in part) were established.

The First Baptist Church was listed on the National Register of Historic Places in 1994.

== Geography ==
Charleston is in southern Montgomery County, bordered to the south by Schoharie County. The eastern town boundary is defined by Schoharie Creek. Amsterdam, the only city in Montgomery County, is 11 miles (18 km) to the northeast. New York State Route 30A crosses the center of the town, leading north 7 miles (11 km) to Fultonville and south 10 miles (16 km) to Central Bridge. New York State Route 162 cuts across the southwestern corner of the town, leading northwest 11 miles (18 km) to Canajoharie and southeast 5 miles (8 km) to Sloansville.

According to the U.S. Census Bureau, the town of Charleston has a total area of 42.9 square miles (111 km^{2}), of which 42.0 square miles (109 km^{2}) are land and 0.9 square miles (2.3 km^{2}), or 2.00%, are water. The town is within the Mohawk River watershed, draining to various north-flowing creeks that lead to the river. The eastern half of the town and the southernmost part of town drain to Schoharie Creek, the largest of the creeks with contributing lands in Charleston. The northwest corner of the town drains to Auries Creek, and the remainder of the western part drains to Yatesville Creek and Flat Creek.

== Demographics ==
Historical population
Census	Pop.	Note	%±
1820	5,365		—
1830	2,148		−60.0%
1840	2,103		−2.1%
1850	2,216		5.4%
1860	1,837		−17.1%
1870	1,601		−12.8%
1880	1,334		−16.7%
1890	1,174		−12.0%
1900	1,052		−10.4%
1910	900		−14.4%
1920	785		−12.8%
1930	594		−24.3%
1940	609		2.5%
1950	575		−5.6%
1960	546		−5.0%
1970	658		20.5%
1980	1,013		54.0%
1990	1,107		9.3%
2000	1,292		16.7%
2010	1,373		6.3%
2020	1,355		−1.3%

As of the census of 2000, there were 1,292 people, 472 households, and 343 families residing in the town. The population density was 30.3 inhabitants per square mile (11.7/km^{2}). There were 564 housing units at an average density of 13.2 per square mile (5.1/km^{2}). The racial makeup of the town was 97.68% White, 0.85% African American, 0.08% Native American, 0.23% Asian, 0.08% from other races, and 1.08% from two or more races. Hispanic or Latino of any race were 1.16% of the population.

There were 472 households, out of which 34.7% had children under the age of 18 living with them, 60.8% were married couples living together, 6.8% had a female householder with no husband present, and 27.3% were non-families. 18.6% of all households were made up of individuals, and 7.0% had someone living alone who was 65 years of age or older. The average household size was 2.74 and the average family size was 3.15.

In the town, the population was spread out, with 26.2% under the age of 18, 7.6% from 18 to 24, 31.3% from 25 to 44, 24.3% from 45 to 64, and 10.6% who were 65 years of age or older. The median age was 37 years. For every 100 females, there were 102.2 males. For every 100 females age 18 and over, there were 102.8 males.

The median income for a household in the town was $38,125, and the median income for a family was $45,221. Males had a median income of $35,300 versus $21,184 for females. The per capita income for the town was $16,818. About 6.6% of families and 10.1% of the population were below the poverty line, including 12.6% of those under age 18 and 4.4% of those age 65 or over.

== Communities and locations in Charleston ==
- Burtonville – A hamlet at the eastern town line by Schoharie Creek.
- Charleston (also called "Riders Corners") – A hamlet in the northern part of town on NY-30A.
- Charleston Four Corners – A hamlet southwest of Charleston hamlet, located on NY-162.
- Davis Corners – A location southwest of Charleston hamlet on NY-30A.
- Fox Corners – A location southwest of Charleston hamlet.
- Lib Corners – A location northeast of Oak Ridge.
- Lost Valley – A location at the eastern town line and Schoharie Creek, north of Burtonville.
- Market Corners – A location between Charleston hamlet and Oak Ridge on NY-30A.
- Oak Ridge – A hamlet south of Charleston hamlet on NY-30A and near the southern town line.
- Rockwell Corners – A location by the southern town boundary.

The now-defunct hamlet of Carytown is also listed in the official New York State Gazetteer, maintained and published by the New York State Department of Health, which includes numerous defunct hamlets and towns, some with alternate or archaic spellings.
