= New York State Route 161 =

State highway in Montgomery County, New York, US

New York State Route 161
- Map of Montgomery County in eastern New York with NY 161 highlighted in red

Route information
- Maintained by NYSDOT
- Length: 7.06 mi (11.36 km)
- Existed: 1930–present

Major junctions
- West end: NY 30A in Glen
- East end: NY 30 in Florida

Location
- Country: United States
- State: New York
- Counties: Montgomery

Highway system
- New York Highways; Interstate; US; State; Reference; Parkways
← NY 160	→ NY 162

New York State Route 161 (NY 161) is an east–west state highway located in eastern Montgomery County, New York, in the United States. It extends for just over 7 miles (11 km) from an intersection with NY 30A in the town of Glen to a junction with NY 30 in the town of Florida. The route is a two-lane highway known as Mill Point Road, named for a small hamlet situated near NY 161's midpoint. At Mill Point, the road crosses Schoharie Creek. NY 161 was assigned as part of the 1930 renumbering of state highways in New York and has not been altered since.

== Route description ==
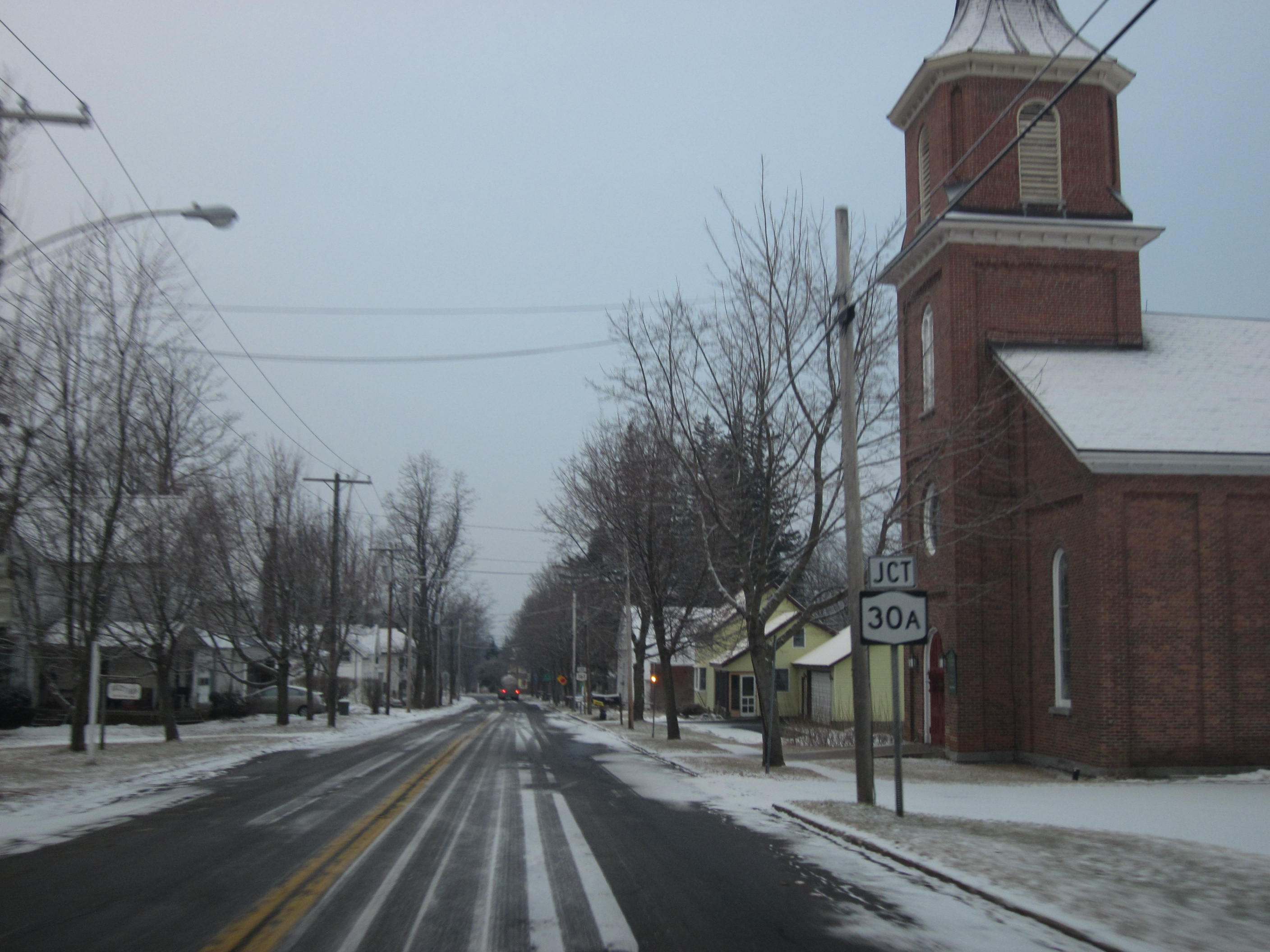
NY 161 westbound approaching the junction with NY 30A in Glen

NY 161 begins at a five-way intersection in the hamlet of Glen, located within the town of the same name. NY 30A heads southwest to northeast through the junction at a sharp angle, while Auriesville Road splits from NY 30A north of NY 161 and Logtown Road begins straight ahead from NY 161's west end. The route heads to the east as a two-lane highway named Mill Point Road, leaving the populated hamlet for more rural, open areas of the town. After crossing 1.6 miles (2.6 km) of rolling farmland, the highway intersects Noeltner Road by way of a Y intersection. The junction once served as the southern terminus of NY 288; however, it now marks the south end of County Route 164 (CR 164).

Past Noeltner Road, NY 161 takes on a more northeasterly alignment, slowly bringing the route down the west side of a shallow valley surrounding Schoharie Creek. At the base of the gully is the small hamlet of Mill Point that gives NY 161 its name. It continues on, crossing the creek and entering the town of Florida before quickly ascending the valley's eastern face. Outside of the depression, NY 161 turns to the northeast, crossing another 2.5 miles (4.0 km) of rolling farmland and passing over South Chuctanunda Creek before ending at a junction with NY 30 1.3 miles (2.1 km) north of the hamlet of Minaville and 3 miles (5 km) southwest of the city of Amsterdam.

== History ==
On July 11, 1906, the state of New York let a contract for a project to improve 2.74 miles (4.41 km) of highway within the town of Florida to state highway standards. One of the roads improved at this time was the portion of modern NY 161 east of Denise Road. The project cost $29,072 (equivalent to $1,017,412 in 2024) and was completed by mid-1908. The 2.74 miles of improved highway were added to the state highway system on July 1, 1908, and legislatively designated as State Highway 299. The section of modern NY 161 west of Schoharie Creek was improved to state highway standards in the early to mid-1920s, while the piece between the creek and Denise Road was rebuilt sometime after 1926. NY 161 was assigned to its current alignment as part of the 1930 renumbering of state highways in New York. NY 161 originally extended further eastward along the current Logtown Road and terminated at NY 162 in the hamlet of Rural Grove.

== NY 161A ==
New York State Route 161A
- Location: Florida
- Existed: c. 1931–c. 1938

NY 161A was a short spur in the town of Florida that connected NY 161 to NY 30 just north of the hamlet of Minaville by way of Youngs Corners and Dunlap Roads. The highways were state-maintained by 1926 and designated as NY 161A c. 1931. The designation was removed c. 1938.

== Major intersections ==
The entire route is in Montgomery County.

Location	mi	km	Destinations	Notes
Town of Glen	0.00	0.00	NY 30A to I-90 / New York Thruway – Sloansville, Fultonville	Western terminus; hamlet of Glen
Town of Glen	1.50	2.41	Noeltner Road (CR 164) – Auriesville	Former southern terminus of NY 288
Florida	7.06	11.36	NY 30 to I-90 / New York Thruway – Minaville, Amsterdam	Eastern terminus
1.000 mi = 1.609 km; 1.000 km = 0.621 mi
