= Burning of Currytown =

- Part of the American Revolutionary War
Date	July 9, 1781
Location	Root, New York

Belligerents
United States	Great Britain; Haudenosaunee

Commanders and leaders
Marinus Willett	John Doxtader

Strength
unknown settlers of vicinity; 260 militia under Willett	300–500 Loyalists and Haudenosaunee warriors

Casualties and losses
several settlers killed 9 prisoners taken, 8 killed the following day	none

The Burning of Currytown or the Invasion of Currytown was a Loyalist-Haudenosaunee raid led against frontier settlers during the American Revolutionary War. The attack occurred on July 9, 1781 in Currytown, presently near Rural Grove in the Town of Root, Montgomery County, New York.

== The attack ==
On July 9, 1781 Doxtader commanded a force of three to five hundred Indians and Loyalists in an attack on the frontier settlement of Currytown, in the present-day town of Root, Montgomery County, New York. The town was burned, a number of inhabitants were killed, and nine prisoners were taken.The invaders were driven out by forces commanded by Colonel Marinus Willet.

A small block house, Fort Lewis, had been erected near his dwelling and picketed in. This more than once afforded a refuge for the settlers in the vicinity. The settlement was invaded by a party of Indians and Tories under Capt. John Doxstader, July 9, 1781. When they arrived about ten o'clock in the morning, "Rudolph Keller, Henry Lewis and Conrad Enders (Antes) were the only men in the fort... ...Frederick Lewis and Henry Lewis, Jr., were among the first to gain the fort; the former fired three successive guns to warn the settlers of danger, and several thus seasonably warned found a safe retreat in the forest. ... The Indians plundered and burnt all the buildings in the settlement, a dozen or more in number, except the house of David Lewis"

A force was dispatched by Col. Marinus Willett , which totaled 260 in number. This force met the raiding party the next day at the Battle of New Dorlach.

There was one very painful circumstance attending this battle. In their excursion to Currietown, the day before, Doxstader and his Indians had made nine prisoners, among whom were Jacob and Frederick Diefendorff, Jacob Myers and a son, a black boy, and four others. The moment the battle commenced, the prisoners, who were bound to standing trees for security, were tomahawked and scalped by their captors, and left as dead. The bodies of these unfortunate men were buried by Colonel Willett's troops. Fortunately, however, the graves were superficial, and the covering slight-a circumstance which enabled Jacob Diefendorff, who, though stunned and apparently dead, was yet alive, to disentomb himself. A detachment of militia, under Colonel Veeder, having repaired to the field of action after Willett had returned to Fort Rensselaer, discovered the supposed deceased on the outside of his own grave; and he has lived to furnish the author of the present work with an account of his own burial and resurrection.
