= Florida, Montgomery County, New York =

Florida, New York
- Town
- Location within Montgomery County and the state of New York
- Coordinates: 42°54′N 74°12′W
- Country: United States
- State: New York
- County: Montgomery

Government
  - Town supervisor: William E. Strevy (R)

Area
  - Total: 51.40 sq mi (133.13 km^{2})
  - Land: 50.13 sq mi (129.83 km^{2})
  - Water: 1.27 sq mi (3.30 km^{2})

Population (2020)
  - Total: 2,667
  - Density: 53.2/sq mi (20.5/km^{2})
- Time zone: UTC−05 (EST)
  - Summer (DST): UTC−04 (EDT)
- ZIP Codes: 12010 (Amsterdam); 12069 (Fort Hunter); 12053 (Delanson); 12137 (Pattersonville)
- FIPS code: 36-057-26308
- Website: www.townofflorida.com

Florida is a town in Montgomery County, New York, United States. The population was 2,667 as of the 2020 census. The town was named after the state of Florida. It is located in the eastern end of Montgomery County and is south of the Mohawk River and the city of Amsterdam, which it borders.

== History ==
The first recorded contact by Europeans with local Mohawk people, who had occupied the area for centuries, was the 1642 visit of Jesuit missionaries to the village Tionondoroge (in one of its variations). After failing to Christianize the Mohawk, forces from French Canada twice attacked the village in 1667 and 1693 during rising conflict with the people in the valley.

The Dutch, followed by the English, established trading relationships with the Mohawk from their bases in Albany and Schenectady. On a trip to London to visit Queen Anne in 1710, arranged by the Albany mayor Peter Schuyler, the Four Mohawk Kings asked for help in defense against the French, and for Anglican missionaries to offset French Catholic influence. (Numerous Catholic Mohawk had moved to the St. Lawrence River valley, where they settled in Kahnawake south of Montreal.)

The Crown authorized the construction of Fort Hunter near Tionondega in 1711; its fortified area included a wooden Anglican chapel, known as Queen Anne's chapel. The Crown also encouraged the sending of two Anglican missionaries. Some traders and other Europeans began to settle near the fort as well.

Later, William Johnson arrived as a young immigrant from Ireland to begin his illustrious colonial career, first as an overseer of property in the town. Learning the Mohawk language and ways, he was appointed British agent to the Iroquois in New York, and established strong relationships with them. The Crown later made him a baronet for his contributions, and he was appointed British Superintendent of Indian Affairs in the northern colonies.

Due to the influence of Johnson and their long trading relationship with the British, the Mohawk and three other Iroquois nations allied with them during the American Revolution. A log meeting house church was built by James Dempster, a Methodist minister who had arrived in America with Francis Asbury, at Warrensbush, probably in 1778. With the British defeat, the United States forced the Mohawk and other allied Iroquois nations to cede nearly all their territory in New York. They resettled in Canada on land granted by the British Crown.

The town was founded by European Americans in 1793 on the anniversary of the discovery of Florida by Juan Ponce de León. The towns of Florida and Charleston divided the old "Town of Mohawk", ending its existence. A new town of Mohawk was later created farther west in the county.

The completion of the Erie Canal in 1825 eased transportation through the Mohawk Valley, connecting it to both the Great Lakes and the Hudson River and New York City markets. This greatly increased economic development in villages and cities along the canal.

In 1880, the village of Port Jackson in the town was annexed to form part of the city of Amsterdam. Port Jackson had been an important port on the Erie Canal and a ferry station connecting the south side of the Mohawk River to Amsterdam.

== Geography ==
Florida is in eastern Montgomery County, bordered to the southeast by Schenectady County, to the north by the Mohawk River and the city of Amsterdam, and to the west by Schoharie Creek. The New York State Thruway (Interstate 90) passes across the town near the Mohawk River, leading southeast 32 miles (51 km) to Albany, the state capital, and west 60 miles (97 km) to Utica. New York State Route 30 crosses the center of the town, leading north into Amsterdam and south 19 miles (31 km) to Schoharie. State Route 161 intersects NY-30 south of the Thruway and leads west 7 miles (11 km) to Glen. State Route 5S parallels the Mohawk River.

According to the U.S. Census Bureau, the town of Florida has a total area of 51.4 square miles (133 km^{2}), of which 50.1 square miles (130 km^{2}) are land and 1.3 square miles (3.4 km^{2}), or 2.48%, are water.

== Demographics ==
Historical population
Census	Pop.	Note	%±
1820	2,743		—
1830	2,838		3.5%
1840	5,214		83.7%
1850	3,571		−31.5%
1860	2,991		−16.2%
1870	3,002		0.4%
1880	3,249		8.2%
1890	2,296		−29.3%
1900	1,988		−13.4%
1910	1,904		−4.2%
1920	1,651		−13.3%
1930	1,805		9.3%
1940	1,848		2.4%
1950	2,032		10.0%
1960	2,168		6.7%
1970	2,283		5.3%
1980	2,578		12.9%
1990	2,637		2.3%
2000	2,731		3.6%
2010	2,696		−1.3%
2020	2,667		−1.1%

As of the census of 2000, there were 2,731 people, 1,056 households, and 772 families residing in the town. The population density was 54.2 inhabitants per square mile (20.9/km^{2}). There were 1,140 housing units at an average density of 22.6 per square mile (8.7/km^{2}). The racial makeup of the town was 98.24% White, 0.22% African-American, 0.15% Native American, 0.15% Asian, 0.18% from other races, and 1.06% from two or more races. Hispanic or Latino of any race were 2.34% of the population.

There were 1,056 households, out of which 31.7% had children under the age of 18 living with them, 61.4% were married couples living together, 6.2% had a female householder with no husband present, and 26.8% were non-families. 21.9% of all households were made up of individuals, and 10.7% had someone living alone who was 65 years of age or older. The average household size was 2.57 and the average family size was 2.98.

In the town, the population was spread out, with 24.4% under the age of 18, 5.7% from 18 to 24, 28.4% from 25 to 44, 26.8% from 45 to 64, and 14.6% who were 65 years of age or older. The median age was 40 years. For every 100 females, there were 99.2 males. For every 100 females age 18 and over, there were 97.4 males.

The median income for a household in the town was $43,317, and the median income for a family was $49,100. Males had a median income of $29,917 versus $26,944 for females. The per capita income for the town was $18,246. About 4.3% of families and 4.4% of the population were below the poverty line, including 3.8% of those under age 18 and 5.9% of those age 65 or over.

== Communities and locations in the town of Florida ==
- Fort Hunter ("Lower Mohawk Castle") – A hamlet in the northwestern part of the town near the Mohawk River and Schoharie Creek junction.
- Lost Valley – A location south of Wellsville by Schoharie Creek.
- Millers Corner – A hamlet in the southwestern part of the town.
- Mill Point – A location north of Wellsville by Schoharie Creek which is located partially in the town of Glen.
- Minaville – A hamlet south of South Amsterdam on NY-30.
- Scotch Bush – A hamlet southeast of Minaville on NY-30, once known for its springs.
- Scotch Church – A location on the southeastern town boundary, east of Scotch Bush.
- Snooks Corner – A location south of Fort Hunter.
- South Chuctanunda Creek – A tributary of the Mohawk River, flowing northward through Florida.
- Wellsville – A hamlet at the western town line near Schoharie Creek.
- Youngs Corners – A location east of Wellsville.
- Youngs Lakes – oxbow lakes south of Wellsville, formerly part of Schoharie Creek.

== Media ==
The town is the home of WVTL Radio studios, on New York State Route 5.

== Notable people ==
- Isaac A. Fancher (1833–1934), Michigan state politician
