= Rotterdam (disambiguation) =

Rotterdam is a city in the Netherlands.

Rotterdam may also refer to:

== Geography ==
- Rotterdam (town), New York, a town in New York state
- Rotterdam (CDP), New York, a hamlet in New York state
- Port of Rotterdam
- Nomuka, an island in Tonga previously named Rotterdam

== Ships ==
- SS Rotterdam (1872)
- Three ships built for the Holland America Line:
  - SS Rotterdam, an ocean liner built in 1959, now a hotel and museum in Rotterdam
  - MS Rotterdam, a cruise ship built in 1997
  - MS Rotterdam (2020), a Pinnacle-class cruise ship built in 2020
- HNLMS Rotterdam, two ships of the Dutch navy

== Other ==
- Rotterdam (play), 2015 play by Jon Brittain
- "Rotterdam (Or Anywhere)", a 1996 hit single by The Beautiful South
- "Rotterdam", single by Chuck Ragan 2009

== See also ==
- Rotherham, a town in Yorkshire, England
