= Root, New York =

- Town
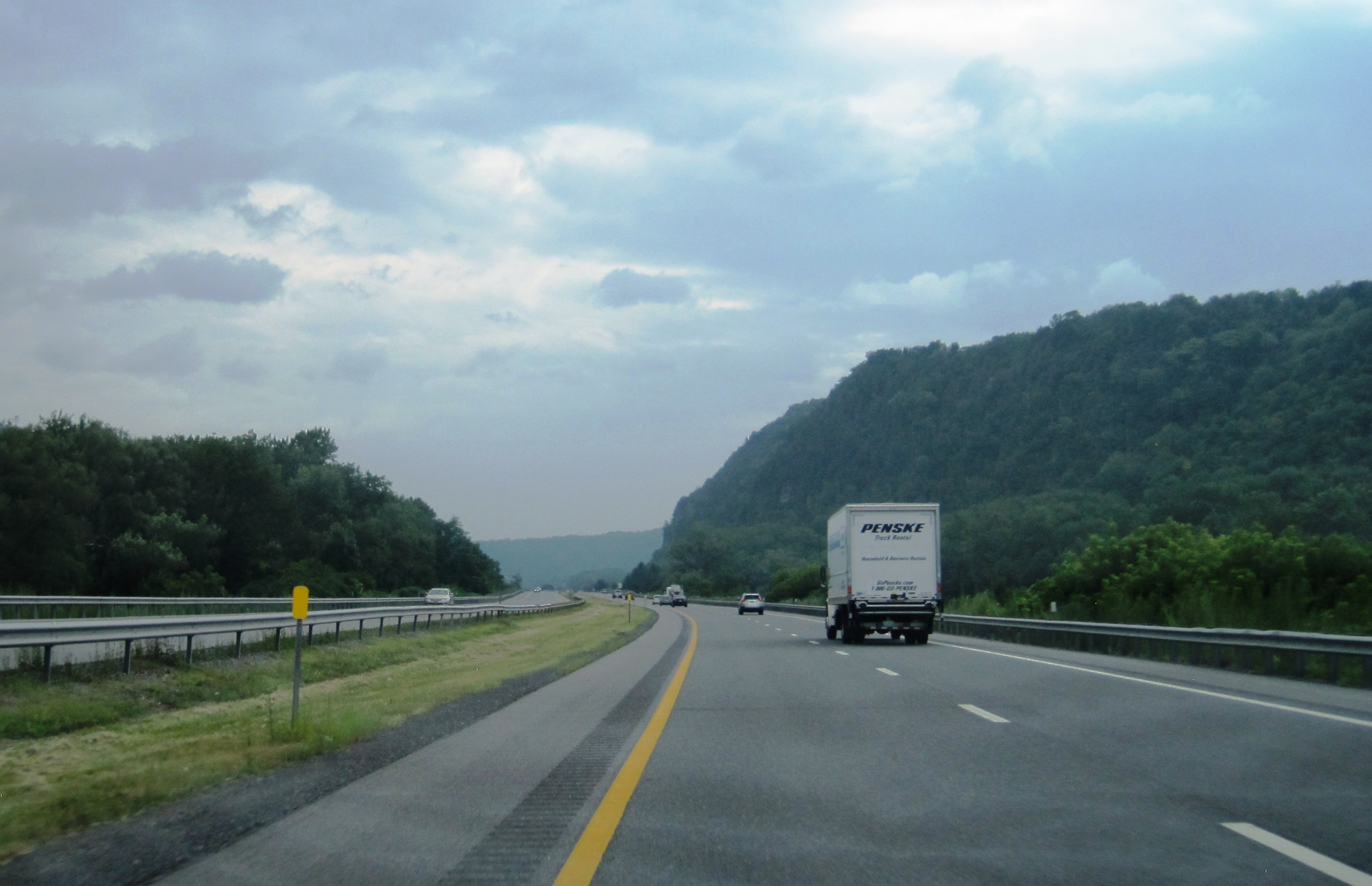
- Little Nose Hill as seen from I-90/NY Thruway

- Location in Montgomery County and the state of New York
- Coordinates: 42°51′1″N 74°28′48″W
- Country: United States
- State: New York
- County: Montgomery

Government
  - Type: Town Council
  - Town Supervisor: Gary A. Kamp (R)
  - Town Council: Members' List: • John Van Kersen (R); • Evelyn B. Lindley (R); • Dominic G. Cuomo (R); • LuEmma K. Quackenbush (D)

Area
  - Total: 51.08 sq mi (132.29 km^{2})
  - Land: 50.65 sq mi (131.19 km^{2})
  - Water: 0.42 sq mi (1.10 km^{2})
- Elevation: 863 ft (263 m)

Population (2020)
  - Total: 2,013
  - Density: 39.7/sq mi (15.3/km^{2})
- Time zone: UTC-5 (Eastern (EST))
  - Summer (DST): UTC-4 (EDT)
- ZIP Codes: 12166 (Sprakers); 12072 (Fultonville); 12160 (Sloansville); 13317 (Canajoharie); 13459 (Sharon Springs)
- Area code: 518
- FIPS code: 36-63561
- GNIS feature ID: 0979432

Root is a town in Montgomery County, New York, United States. The population was 2,013 at the 2020 census, up from 1,715 in 2010. The town was named for Erastus Root, a legislator in the early Federal period.

== History ==
The town of Root was part of a patent of 25,000 acres (100 km^{2}) granted in 1737 to William Corry, George Clark, and others. The first British settler located near Currytown (named for William Corry) before the American Revolution, but this area was very much the frontier. During the Revolution, the small colonial community was raided and burned by Iroquois allies of the British commanded by Captain John Doxtader.

Root, once part of the original "Town of Mohawk", was created in 1823 from part of the town of Charleston. After the Revolutionary War, this area received many land-hungry migrants from New England. For decades, its culture largely was a continuation of that brought by the Yankee settlers.

== Geography ==
Root is in south-central Montgomery County, bordered to the north by the Mohawk River/Erie Canal and to the south by Schoharie County. It is about 20 miles (32 km) southwest of the city of Amsterdam. The New York State Thruway crosses the northern part of the town, following the course of the Mohawk River. The closest access is from the village of Canajoharie to the west. New York State Route 5S also follows the course of the Mohawk and intersects New York State Route 162 at Sprakers in the northwestern section of Root. Route 5S leads west (upriver) 3 miles (5 km) from Sprakers to Canajoharie village and east (downriver) 9 miles (14 km) to Fultonville. Route 162 leads southeast 14 miles (23 km) to Sloansville.

According to the U.S. Census Bureau, the town of Root has a total area of 51.1 square miles (132 km^{2}), of which 50.7 square miles (131 km^{2}) are land and 0.4 square miles (1.0 km^{2}), or 0.83%, are water. Most of the town is drained by north-flowing tributaries of the Mohawk River, most notably Flat Creek in the west, and by Lasher Creek and Yatesville Creek to the east. The southernmost part of town is drained by Fly Creek, an east-flowing tributary of Schoharie Creek, which flows north to the Mohawk at Fort Hunter.

== Demographics ==
Historical population
Census	Pop.	Note	%±
1830	2,750		—
1840	2,979		8.3%
1850	2,736		−8.2%
1860	2,622		−4.2%
1870	2,492		−5.0%
1880	2,275		−8.7%
1890	2,041		−10.3%
1900	1,653		−19.0%
1910	1,512		−8.5%
1920	1,198		−20.8%
1930	1,021		−14.8%
1940	1,106		8.3%
1950	1,214		9.8%
1960	1,243		2.4%
1970	1,513		21.7%
1980	1,801		19.0%
1990	1,692		−6.1%
2000	1,752		3.5%
2010	1,715		−2.1%
2020	2,013		17.4%
U.S. Decennial Census

As of the census of 2000, there were 1,752 people, 656 households, and 492 families residing in the town. The population density was 34.5 inhabitants per square mile (13.3/km^{2}). There were 755 housing units at an average density of 14.9 per square mile (5.8/km^{2}). The racial makeup of the town was 98.06% White, 0.40% African American, 0.29% Native American, 0.34% Asian, 0.23% from other races, and 0.68% from two or more races. Hispanic or Latino of any race were 1.14% of the population.

There were 656 households, out of which 33.4% had children under the age of 18 living with them, 62.0% were married couples living together, 7.9% had a female householder with no husband present, and 25.0% were non-families. 19.7% of all households were made up of individuals, and 10.1% had someone living alone who was 65 years of age or older. The average household size was 2.67 and the average family size was 3.08.

In the town, the population was spread out, with 26.7% under the age of 18, 5.5% from 18 to 24, 27.9% from 25 to 44, 26.3% from 45 to 64, and 13.6% who were 65 years of age or older. The median age was 40 years. For every 100 females, there were 100.9 males. For every 100 females age 18 and over, there were 100.9 males.

The median income for a household in the town was $38,060, and the median income for a family was $41,927. Males had a median income of $28,073 versus $22,656 for females. The per capita income for the town was $16,206. About 8.4% of families and 11.8% of the population were below the poverty line, including 17.3% of those under age 18 and 9.1% of those age 65 or over.

== Government ==
Root is a town of the Second Class under New York State law, with an elected town board of four members, plus a town supervisor, who is a voting member of the board.

=== Town of Root supervisors ===
- Gary A. Kamp (2014–present)
- John W. Thayer (2008–2013)
- Brian S. Cechnicki (2004–2007)
- John Van Kersen (1992–2003)
- John W. Cechnicki (1982–1991)

== Communities and locations in Root ==
- Browns Hollow – A hamlet southwest of Root Center.
- Buttermilk Falls – A waterfall located northeast of Currytown.
- Currytown – A hamlet on NY-162 near the center of Root. The name is derived from "Corry's patent".
- Flat Creek – A location southwest of Currytown, located on Flat Creek. The hamlet contains the Root town offices and facilities.
- Flat Creek – A tributary of the Mohawk River, flowing northward through western Root.
- Kilmartin Corners – A location by the southern town line.
- Little Nose – A landmark near the Mohawk River, which along with Big Nose on the opposite bank marks a place called "The Noses," an area of a break in the Appalachian Mountains, through which the Erie Canal was built.
- Lykers (formerly "Lykers Corners") – A location south of Root Center.
- Randall – A hamlet in the northeastern part of Root on NY-5S.
- Root Center – A hamlet south of Currytown.
- Rural Grove – A hamlet southeast of Currytown on NY-162.
- Sprakers (formerly "Sprakers Basin") – A hamlet on the Erie Canal and Mohawk River and the junction of NY-5S and NY-162 in the northeastern part of Root.
- Stone Ridge – A hamlet on the town line in the northeastern corner of the town on NY-5S.
- Sutphens Hollow – A former community in the northwestern section of Root, located by Flat Creek and formerly called "Hamilton Hollow".
- Yatesville – A former community located by the Mohawk River.

== Notable people ==
- Stewart Friesen, race car driver
- Annabel Morris Holvey (1855–1910), newspaper editor, social reformer
- George A. Mitchell, founder of Cadillac, Michigan
