= New York State Route 288 =

Former state highway in New York State

New York State Route 288
- Noeltner Road
- NY 288 highlighted in red

Route information
- Maintained by NYSDOT
- Length: 2.39 mi (3.85 km)
- Existed: early 1940s–April 1, 1981

Major junctions
- South end: NY 161 in Glen
- North end: NY 5S in Glen

Location
- Country: United States
- State: New York
- Counties: Montgomery

Highway system
- New York Highways; Interstate; US; State; Reference; Parkways
← NY 287	→ NY 289

New York State Route 288 (NY 288) was a north–south state highway in Montgomery County, New York, in the United States. It extended for 2.39 miles (3.85 km) as Noeltner Road through a rural portion of the town of Glen, serving as a connector between NY 161 east of the hamlet of Glen and NY 5S east of the hamlet of Auriesville. NY 288 was assigned in the early 1940s and existed until 1981 when ownership and maintenance of the road was transferred to Montgomery County. The NY 288 designation was subsequently removed, and its former routing became County Route 164 (CR 164).

== Route description ==
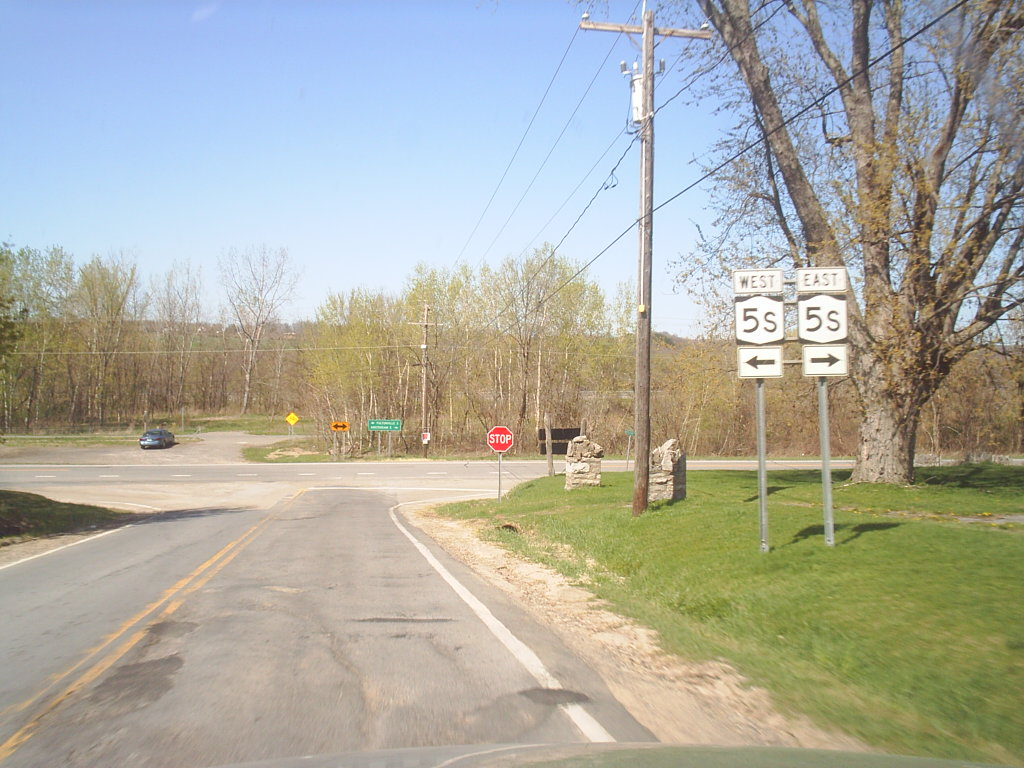
The former north end of NY 288 at NY 5S in Glen

NY 288 began 1.5 miles (2.4 km) east of the hamlet of Glen at a Y-shaped intersection with NY 161 in the town of Glen. From there, it headed to the northeast, following the two-lane Noeltner Road on a linear alignment for roughly 1.3 miles (2.1 km) across rolling, open fields. It broke from the straight path near a junction with CR 120, turning northward into a brief but dense wooded area. The route continued through the narrow forest to a more open area just south of the Mohawk River and the New York State Thruway, where it ended at a junction with NY 5S east of the hamlet of Auriesville. Just southeast of the intersection is the National Shrine of the North American Martyrs, also known as the Auriesville Shrine.

== History ==
The original designation of NY 288 was in northern Oswego County from Sandy Creek to Smartville, at a length of 6.36 miles. This designation was removed by 1940. Today this road is part of Oswego CR 15.

NY 288 was assigned in the early 1940s. The route remained intact until April 1, 1981, when ownership and maintenance of the route was transferred from the state of New York to Montgomery County as part of a highway maintenance swap between the two levels of government. The NY 288 designation was removed as a result and its former routing became CR 164.

== Major intersections ==
The entire route was in Glen, Montgomery County.

mi	km	Destinations	Notes
0.00	0.00	NY 161	Southern terminus
2.39	3.85	NY 5S	Northern terminus; hamlet of Auriesville
1.000 mi = 1.609 km; 1.000 km = 0.621 mi

== See also ==
- List of county routes in Montgomery County, New York
