= Mill Point, New York =

- Hamlet
- Location within New York Location within the United States
- Coordinates: 42°53′12″N 74°16′36″W
- Country: United States
- State: New York
- County: Montgomery
- Towns: Florida, Glen
- Elevation: 360 ft (110 m)
- Time zone: UTC-5 (Eastern (EST))
  - Summer (DST): UTC-4 (EDT)
- Area code: 518

Mill Point is a hamlet in the towns of Florida and Glen in Montgomery County, New York, United States. It is located on New York State Route 161.
