= Pattersonville-Rotterdam Junction, New York =

Pattersonville-Rotterdam Junction
- Former CDP
- Location within the state of New York Pattersonville-Rotterdam Junction (the United States)
- Coordinates: 42°52′44″N 74°3′32″W
- Country: United States
- State: New York
- County: Schenectady

Area
  - Total: 1.5 sq mi (3.9 km^{2})
  - Land: 1.4 sq mi (3.5 km^{2})
  - Water: 0.15 sq mi (0.4 km^{2})

Population (2000)
  - Total: 918
  - Density: 680/sq mi (262.5/km^{2})
- Time zone: UTC-5 (Eastern (EST))
  - Summer (DST): UTC-4 (EDT)
- FIPS code: 36-56764

Pattersonville-Rotterdam Junction was a census-designated place (CDP) in Schenectady County, New York, United States. The population was 918 at the 2000 census. The area was not delineated as a CDP for the 2010 census.

The CDP was in the town of Rotterdam and took its name from two hamlets in the town.

== Geography ==
The Pattersonville-Rotterdam Junction CDP was located at 42°52′44″N 74°3′32″W (42.878941, -74.058756).

According to the United States Census Bureau, the CDP had a total area of 1.5 square miles (3.9 km^{2}), of which 1.4 square miles (3.5 km^{2}) was land and 0.2 square miles (0.4 km^{2}), or 10.60%, was water.

== Demographics ==
As of the census of 2000, there were 918 people, 368 households, and 260 families residing in the CDP. The population density was 680.0 inhabitants per square mile (262.5/km^{2}). There were 381 housing units at an average density of 282.2 per square mile (109.0/km^{2}). The racial makeup of the CDP was 98.47% White, 0.33% African American, 0.44% Native American, 0.33% Asian, and 0.44% from two or more races. Hispanic or Latino of any race were 1.31% of the population.

There were 368 households, out of which 29.3% had children under the age of 18 living with them, 56.3% were married couples living together, 12.0% had a female householder with no husband present, and 29.3% were non-families. 23.1% of all households were made up of individuals, and 8.4% had someone living alone who was 65 years of age or older. The average household size was 2.49 and the average family size was 2.95.

In the CDP, the population was spread out, with 22.0% under the age of 18, 8.5% from 18 to 24, 26.7% from 25 to 44, 25.8% from 45 to 64, and 17.0% who were 65 years of age or older. The median age was 41 years. For every 100 females, there were 95.7 males. For every 100 females age 18 and over, there were 90.4 males.

The median income for a household in the CDP was $42,857, and the median income for a family was $55,547. Males had a median income of $29,000 versus $25,750 for females. The per capita income for the CDP was $19,039. None of the families and 3.6% of the population were living below the poverty line, including no under eighteens and 12.0% of those over 64.

== Historic site ==
Rotterdam Junction is the site of the Mabee House which, dating to the 17th century, is the oldest house in the Mohawk Valley. The house is part of the Mabee Farm Historic Site, owned and operated by the Schenectady County Historical Society.
