= Van Wie Creek =

- Location of the mouth within New York Van Wie Creek (the United States)

Location
- Country: United States
- State: New York

Physical characteristics
- Mouth: Mohawk River
  - location: Randall
  - coordinates: 42°55′38″N 74°25′28″W
  - elevation: 275 ft (84 m)
- Basin size: 9.22 sq mi (23.9 km^{2})

Van Wie Creek is a river in the state of New York. It flows into the Mohawk River near Randall, New York.
