= Yatesville Creek =

Yatesville Creek Wasontha
- Location of the mouth of Yatesville Creek Yatesville Creek (the United States)

Location
- Country: United States
- State: New York
- Region: Central New York
- County: Montgomery

Physical characteristics
- Source
  - location: Northeast of Charleston Four Corners
  - coordinates: 42°49′33″N 74°22′08″W
  - elevation: Approximately 1,240 ft (380 m)
- Mouth: Mohawk River
  - location: Randall
  - coordinates: 42°54′21″N 74°27′29″W
  - elevation: 285 ft (87 m)
- Basin size: 12.5 sq mi (32 km^{2})

Basin features
- Waterfalls: Yatesville Falls

Yatesville Creek is a river in Montgomery County in the state of New York. It begins northeast of Charleston Four Corners and flows in a general northwest direction before converging with the Mohawk River in Randall. The creek flows through the 712 acres (2.88 km^{2}) Yatesville Falls State Forest which was purchased by the state in the 1930s. Within the state forest is Yatesville Falls, also known as Buttermilk Falls, is located on the creek. On a land grant, dated 1727, it is referred to by the Indian name "Wasontha".

== History ==
A Mohawk Indian village, known as Onekagonka, was located at or near the mouth of Yatesville Creek.
