= Enlarged Double Lock No. 23, Old Erie Canal =

- U.S. National Register of Historic Places
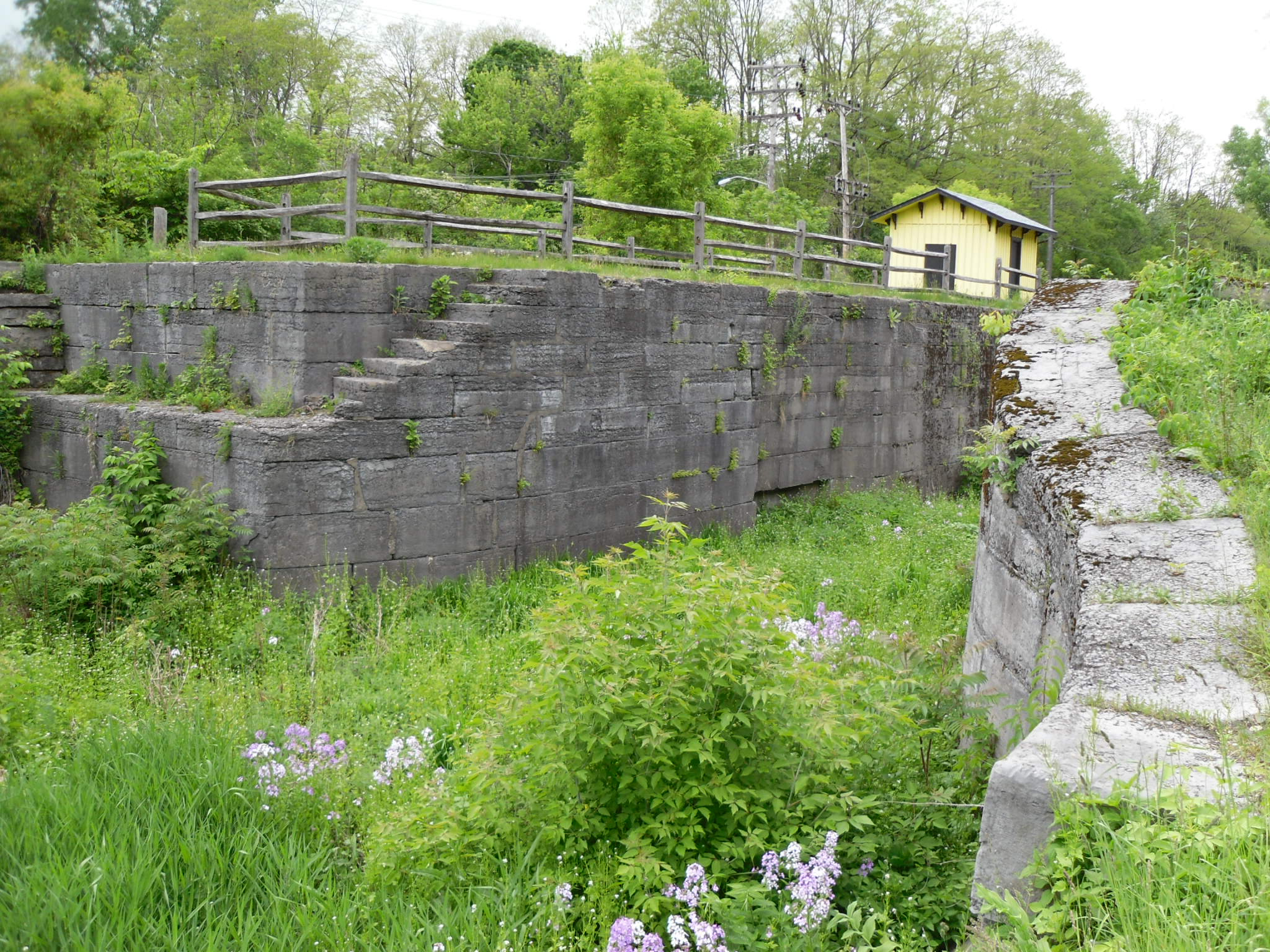
- Enlarged Double Lock No. 23, Old Erie Canal, May 2010

- Location within New York Location within the United States
- Nearest city: Rotterdam, New York
- Coordinates: 42°49′25″N 73°59′13″W
- Area: 2 acres (0.81 ha)
- Built: 1841
- NRHP reference No.: 08000145
- Added to NRHP: March 6, 2008

Enlarged Double Lock No. 23, Old Erie Canal is a historic Erie Canal lock located at Rotterdam in Schenectady County, New York. It was built in 1841-1842 as part of the First Enlargement. It is built entirely of large cut limestone blocks, laid regular ashlar, and mortared with hydraulic cement. The Northeast lock chamber is 110 feet (34 m) long and 18 feet (5.5 m) wide; the Southwest lock chamber is 220 feet (67 m) long and 18 to 20 feet (6.1 m) wide; and the Center pier is 100 feet (30 m) long and 26 feet (7.9 m) wide. The Southwest lock chamber was expanded in 1889–1890. Lock 23 fell into disuse after the opening of the New York State Barge Canal in 1918. The lock chambers contain no water and the area is open as a local park. The site was reclaimed and stabilized by local volunteers starting in 1999. A replica of a board and batten locktender's hut was constructed between 2000 and 2003 by students from the Union College Department of Civil Engineering.

It was added to the National Register of Historic Places in 2008.
