= Glen Historic District =

Historic district in New York, United States

- U.S. National Register of Historic Places
- U.S. Historic district
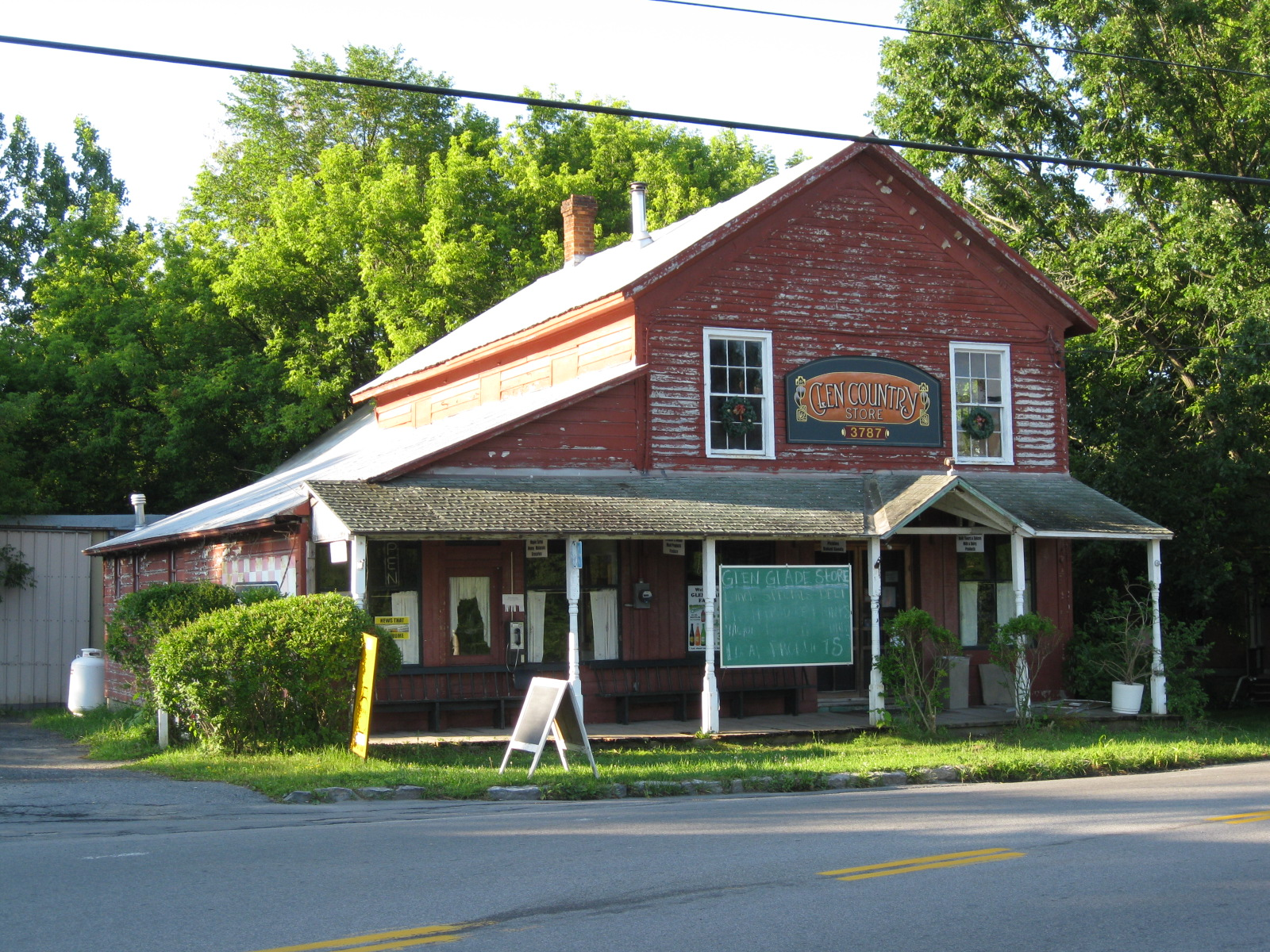
- Glen Country Store, July 2009

- Location within New York Location within the United States
- Location: NY 30A, NY 161 and Logtown Rd., Glen, New York
- Coordinates: 42°53′40″N 74°20′33″W
- Area: 25 acres (10 ha)
- Built: 1818
- Architectural style: Federal, Greek Revival, et al.
- NRHP reference No.: 01000844
- Added to NRHP: August 8, 2001

Glen Historic District is a national historic district located at Glen in Montgomery County, New York. It includes 52 contributing buildings and two contributing sites. The district encompasses the historic core of a rural crossroads hamlet. The majority of the structures are one and one half or two story, timber-framed buildings with gable roofs. At the crossroads are the most distinguished buildings: two large Federal style residences, a mid-19th century general store, and a distinguished, Second Empire style brick residence built in 1878.

It was listed on the National Register of Historic Places in 2001.

== Gallery ==
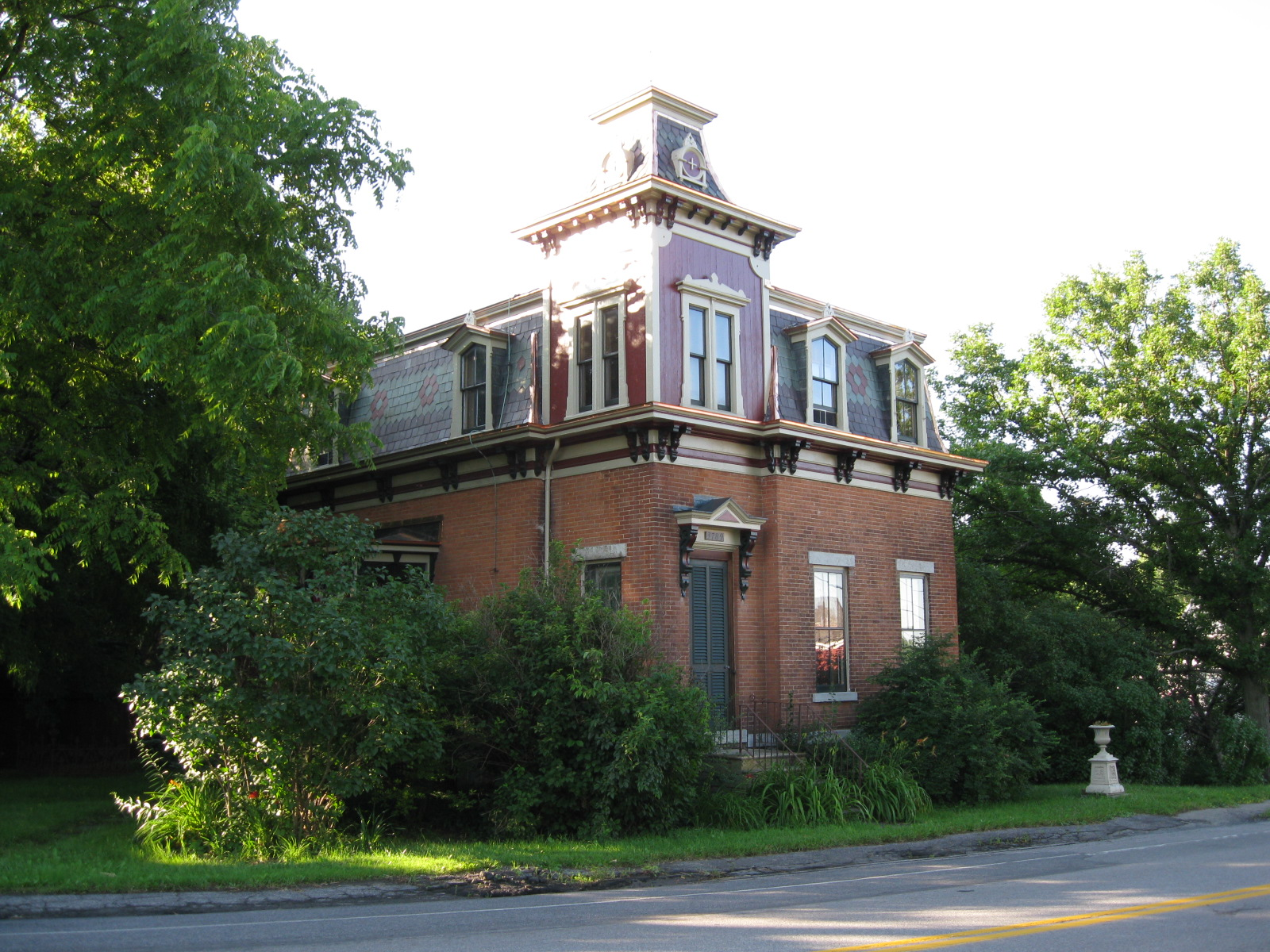
Second Empire Residence, July 2009
