= Dellemont–Wemple Farm =

- U.S. National Register of Historic Places
- Location within New York Location within the United States
- Location: W of Schenectady on Wemple Rd., Rotterdam, New York
- Coordinates: 42°46′16″N 74°0′30″W
- Area: 90 acres (36 ha)
- Built: 1770
- Architectural style: Early Dutch style
- NRHP reference No.: 73001266
- Added to NRHP: October 25, 1973

Dellemont–Wemple Farm is a historic farm complex located at Rotterdam in Schenectady County, New York. The complex consists of the farmhouse, Dutch barn, chicken house, and family cemetery. The brick, gambrel roofed Dutch style farmhouse was built about 1790 and sits on a stone foundation. The wood Dutch barn was built about 1770, or earlier.

It was added to the National Register of Historic Places in 1973.
