= Glen, New York =

- Town
- Location in Montgomery County and the state of New York
- Coordinates: 42°54′54″N 74°21′9″W
- Country: United States
- State: New York
- County: Montgomery

Government
  - Type: Town council
  - Town supervisor: Timothy H. Reilly (R)
  - Town council: Members' List: • Ronald C. Crewell (R); • Russel Kelly (Ind.); • Susan Whiteman (D); • Rosalie V. Farina

Area
  - Total: 39.32 sq mi (101.85 km^{2})
  - Land: 38.62 sq mi (100.03 km^{2})
  - Water: 0.70 sq mi (1.82 km^{2})
- Elevation: 590 ft (180 m)

Population (2020)
  - Total: 2,536
  - Density: 65.7/sq mi (25.4/km^{2})
- Time zone: UTC−05 (Eastern (EST))
  - Summer (DST): UTC−04 (EDT)
- ZIP Codes: 12072 (Fultonville); 12016 (Auriesville); 12010 (Amsterdam)
- FIPS code: 36-057-29047
- GNIS feature ID: 0979002
- Website: nytownofglen.gov

Glen is a town in Montgomery County, New York, United States. The population was 2,536 at the 2020 census. The town was named after Jacob Glen, an early landowner.

== History ==
Glen was inside the original town of Mohawk, which was subdivided out of existence. Glen was first settled by European colonists in the 18th century, circa 1725. The town was formed in 1823 from the town of Charleston.

In 1848, a larger concentrated settlement in the town along the Mohawk River incorporated as the village of Fultonville.

== Geography ==
Glen is in east-central Montgomery County, bordered to the north by the Mohawk River/Erie Canal and to the east by Schoharie Creek. The New York State Thruway (Interstate 90) crosses the northern part of Glen to the south of the Mohawk River. The Thruway leads east 40 miles (64 km) to Albany, the state capital, and west 53 miles (85 km) to Utica. New York State Route 5S parallels the Thruway in Glen, leading east 10 miles (16 km) to Amsterdam and west 12 miles (19 km) to Canajoharie. New York State Route 30A crosses the center of Glen, leading north across the Mohawk River into Fonda and south to Sloansville. New York State Route 161 intersects NY-30A in the hamlet of Glen and leads northeast 10 miles to Amsterdam.

According to the U.S. Census Bureau, the town of Glen has a total area of 39.3 square miles (102 km^{2}), of which 38.6 square miles (100 km^{2}) are land and 0.7 square miles (1.8 km^{2}), or 1.80%, are water. Nearly all of the water area is within either the Mohawk River or Schoharie Creek, its tributary.

== Demographics ==
Historical population
Census	Pop.	Note	%±
1830	2,451		—
1840	3,678		50.1%
1850	3,043		−17.3%
1860	2,884		−5.2%
1870	2,782		−3.5%
1880	2,622		−5.8%
1890	2,648		1.0%
1900	2,281		−13.9%
1910	2,002		−12.2%
1920	1,782		−11.0%
1930	1,749		−1.9%
1940	1,754		0.3%
1950	1,742		−0.7%
1960	1,734		−0.5%
1970	1,797		3.6%
1980	1,893		5.3%
1990	1,950		3.0%
2000	2,222		13.9%
2010	2,507		12.8%
2020	2,536		1.2%
U.S. Decennial Census

As of the census of 2000, there were 2,222 people, 781 households, and 567 families residing in the town. The population density was 57.4 inhabitants per square mile (22.2/km^{2}). There were 863 housing units at an average density of 22.3 per square mile (8.6/km^{2}). The racial makeup of the town was 95.59% White, 1.98% African-American, 0.23% Native American, 0.95% Asian, 0.14% from other races, and 1.13% from two or more races. Hispanic or Latino of any race was 2.25% of the population.

There were 781 households, out of which 35.5% had children under the age of 18 living with them, 55.8% were married couples living together, 11.0% had a female householder with no husband present, and 27.4% were non-families. 21.0% of all households were made up of individuals, and 9.0% had someone living alone who was 65 years of age or older. The average household size was 2.64 and the average family size was 3.06.

In the town, the population was spread out, with 25.7% under the age of 18, 8.2% from 18 to 24, 29.6% from 25 to 44, 23.3% from 45 to 64, and 13.3% who were 65 years of age or older. The median age was 37 years. For every 100 females, there were 109.6 males. For every 100 females age 18 and over, there were 109.6 males.

The median income for a household in the town was $41,307, and the median income for a family was $44,674. Males had a median income of $32,473 versus $22,642 for females. The per capita income for the town was $17,583. About 3.0% of families and 6.0% of the population were below the poverty line, including 3.8% of those under the age 18 and 9.6% of those age 65 or over.

== Communities and locations in Glen ==
- Auries Creek – A tributary of the Mohawk in the central part of Glen. The name is derived from a native who lived in the area.
- Auriesville – A hamlet on the Mohawk River in the northeastern part of the town, on NY-5S. Believed to have been developed at the site of a Mohawk village known as Ossernenon, this was the site of the killings of Jesuit missionaries, one in 1642 and two in 1646, by Mohawk people. They are among the eight North American Martyrs canonized in 1930 and venerated by the Roman Catholic Church.
- Fultonville – A village in the northern part of the town, next to the Mohawk River at NY-5S and NY-30A.
- Glen – The hamlet of Glen is in the center of the town at the intersection of NY-161 and NY-30A. The community was originally called "Vorheesville" and "Five Corners". The Glen Historic District was listed on the National Register of Historic Places in 2001.
- Square Barn Corners – A location between Fultonville and Glen village on NY-30A.
- Stone Ridge – A hamlet on the western town boundary, at the Mohawk River and NY-5S.
- Van Wie Creek – A tributary of the Mohawk in the northwestern part of Glen.
