= First Baptist Church (Charleston, New York) =

Historic church in New York, United States

- U.S. National Register of Historic Places
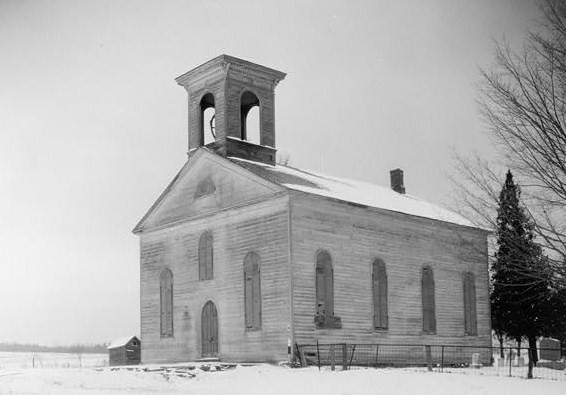
- First Baptist Church, December 1936

- Location within New York Location within the United States
- Location: Polin Rd., Charleston, New York
- Coordinates: 42°50′55″N 74°20′43″W
- Area: 2 acres (0.81 ha)
- Built: 1793
- Architectural style: Federal, Gothic
- NRHP reference No.: 93001546
- Added to NRHP: January 21, 1994

First Baptist Church is a historic Baptist church on Polin Road in Charleston, Montgomery County, New York. It is believed to have been built in the 1820s and remodeled during the 1860s. It is a rural vernacular wood-frame church executed in the late Federal / early Greek Revival style. The 1 1/2-story, heavy timber-framed structure features a square, hip-roofed bell tower. Also on the property are a cemetery, dry-laid stone wall, and receiving vault. The majority of the burials date to the early 19th century, since the church had been organized about 1793. The Charleston Historical Society acquired the property in 1978.

It was added to the National Register of Historic Places in 1994.
