= Glen (hamlet), New York =

Glen, New York
- Hamlet
- Location within New York Location within the United States
- Coordinates: 42°53′39″N 74°20′40″W
- Country: United States
- State: New York
- County: Montgomery
- Town: Glen
- Elevation: 686 ft (209 m)
- Time zone: UTC-5 (Eastern (EST))
  - Summer (DST): UTC-4 (EDT)
- Area code: 518

Glen is a hamlet in the Town of Glen in Montgomery County, New York, United States. It is located at the intersection of New York State Route 30A (NY 30A) and NY 161.
