= Lasher Creek =

- Location of the mouth within New York Lasher Creek (the United States)

Location
- Country: United States
- State: New York

Physical characteristics
- Mouth: Mohawk River
  - location: Randall
  - coordinates: 42°53′44″N 74°28′16″W
  - elevation: 285 ft (87 m)
- Basin size: 5.27 sq mi (13.6 km^{2})

Lasher Creek is a river in the state of New York. It flows into the Mohawk River near Randall.
