= HNLMS Rotterdam =

HNLMS Rotterdam (Dutch: Hr.Ms. or Zr.Ms. Rotterdam) may refer to following ships of the Royal Netherlands Navy:

- Dutch ship Rotterdam (1639), a 10-gun sixth rate ship of the line of the Dutch States Navy
- Dutch ship Rotterdam (1639), a 26-gun fourth rate ship of the line of the Dutch States Navy
- Dutch ship Rotterdam (1655), a 52-gun fourth rate ship of the line of the Dutch States Navy
- Dutch ship Rotterdam (1666), a 6-gun fireship of the Dutch States Navy
- Dutch ship Rotterdam (1670), a 48-gun fourth rate ship of the line of the Dutch States Navy
- Dutch ship Rotterdam (1678), a 44-gun fourth rate ship of the line of the Dutch States Navy
- Dutch ship Rotterdam (1691), a 72-gun second rate ship of the line of the Dutch States Navy
- Dutch ship Rotterdam (1692), a storeship of the Dutch States Navy
- Dutch ship Rotterdam (1695), a 52-gun fourth rate ship of the line of the Dutch States Navy
- Dutch ship Rotterdam (1702), a 2-gun transport ship of the Dutch States Navy
- Dutch ship Rotterdam (1703), a 74-gun third rate ship of the line of the Dutch States Navy
- Dutch ship Rotterdam (1716), a indiaman of the Dutch East India Company
- Dutch ship Rotterdam (1741), a 66-gun third rate ship of the line of the Dutch States Navy
- Dutch ship Rotterdam (1761), a 52-gun fourth rate ship of the line of the Dutch States Navy
- Dutch ship Rotterdam (1783), a 68-gun third rate ship of the line of the Dutch States Navy
- Dutch ship Rotterdam (1862), a 52-gun fourth rate ship of the line of the Dutch States Navy
- HNLMS Rotterdam (D818), a Friesland-class destroyer
- HNLMS Rotterdam (L800), a landing platform dock

Dutch ship Rotterdam (1716)

https://threedecks.org/index.php?display_type=show_ship&id=17437

https://threedecks.org/index.php?display_type=show_ship&id=1312

https://threedecks.org/index.php?display_type=show_ship&id=1255

https://threedecks.org/index.php?display_type=show_ship&id=13889

https://threedecks.org/index.php?display_type=show_ship&id=1114

https://threedecks.org/index.php?display_type=show_ship&id=1118

https://threedecks.org/index.php?display_type=show_ship&id=24398

https://threedecks.org/index.php?display_type=show_ship&id=24401

https://threedecks.org/index.php?display_type=show_ship&id=1204

https://threedecks.org/index.php?display_type=show_ship&id=16367

https://threedecks.org/index.php?display_type=show_ship&id=838

https://threedecks.org/index.php?display_type=show_ship&id=967

https://threedecks.org/index.php?display_type=show_ship&id=958

https://threedecks.org/index.php?display_type=show_ship&id=1036

https://threedecks.org/index.php?display_type=show_ship&id=1300
