= Flat Creek (Mohawk River tributary) =

- Location of the mouth within New York Flat Creek (Mohawk River tributary) (the United States)
- Native name: Onogerreah

Location
- Country: United States
- State: New York
- Counties: Schoharie, Montgomery

Physical characteristics
- Source
  - location: East of Sharon Springs
  - coordinates: 42°47′40″N 74°32′32″W
  - elevation: Approximately 1,145 ft (349 m)
- Mouth: Mohawk River
  - location: Sprakers
  - coordinates: 42°53′39″N 74°30′49″W
  - elevation: 285 ft (87 m)
- Basin size: 52.2 sq mi (135 km^{2})

Basin features
- Waterfalls: Flat Creek Falls

Flat Creek is a river in Schoharie and Montgomery counties in the state of New York. It begins east of Sharon Springs and flows in a general northward direction before flowing into the Mohawk River in Sprakers. Flat Creek Falls, also known as Sprakers Falls, is located on the creek by Sprakers. The Kanyenkeha (Mohawk) referred to the creek as Onogerreah, and the mouth of the creek as Utlogowanke.

== Hydrology ==
There was formerly a stream gauge located where Hilltop Road crosses the creek. It was in service from June 24, 1992 to June 20, 1995.

The land use in the Flat Creek watershed is almost entirely agricultural. The creek has poor water quality, which is most likely due to the large amount of agricultural activity.

== Fishing ==
Suckers can be speared and taken from the section of the creek within Montgomery County from January 1 to May 15, each year.
