= Schenectady County Historical Society =

The Schenectady County Historical Society, located in Schenectady, New York, was established on July 14, 1905, under the Membership Corporation Laws of the State of New York. The society is an independent not-for-profit corporation, not a unit of government. Today, the Schenectady County Historical Society brings to life the region's history through exhibits, talks, workshops, concerts, programs and community events at their three sites: Mabee Farm Historic Site, the Grems-Doolittle Library and the Schenectady History Museum, and the historic Brouwer House Creative.

== History ==
Its stated mission as embodied in its original constitution was “to promote and encourage original historical research; to disseminate a greater knowledge of the history of the State of New York and particularly of Schenectady County; to gather, preserve, display, and make available for study artifacts, books, manuscripts, papers, photographs and other records and materials relating to the early and current history of Schenectady County, New York and of the surrounding area; to encourage the suitable marking of places of historic interest; to acquire by purchase, gifts, devise, or otherwise the title to or the custody and control of historic sites and structures.”

For seven years, the society had no headquarters of its own, but was given space for exhibits in the Schenectady County Public Library. In December 1912, a committee responsible for finding a home for the society succeeded in negotiating a three-year lease for the building at 11-13-15 Union Street that had been erected a half-century earlier to accommodate the offices of the County Clerk and the Surrogate Court and was no longer needed for that purpose. The exhibits were moved from the Library to the new home, and this became the location for monthly meetings for the next 46 years.

In April 1958, the General Electric Company deeded to the society the former G.E. Women's Club building at 32 Washington Avenue “as tangible evidence of its interest and desire to associate itself with those who are working to advance the city's cultural and educational activities." The c. 1895 Georgian style building, whose grounds are adjacent to the waters of the Binnekill and the Mohawk River, displays aspects of Federal and Greek Revival throughout the house. It is located in the Stockade Historic District, declared a national historic site in 1973.

To house an expanding collection of books and documents, a second major addition was added to the rear of the house in 1991. Called the Grems-Doolittle Library in honor of its major benefactor, Mandalay Grems, the Library and the Schenectady History Museum in the original house form the core of the society's downtown Schenectady operations.

In little over a decade, the 1990s, the society grew from a modest house museum called the Dora Jackson House with one room jammed with local history and genealogy, to the expansive Schenectady History Museum; the adjoining Grems-Doolittle historical and genealogical library housing over 2,000 local family files.

The Mabee Farm Historic Site—three 17th-century farm buildings on 9 acres (36,000 m^{2}) in Rotterdam Junction, seven miles (11 km) west of the City of Schenectady was donated to the society in 1993.

The Mabee House had been passed from generation to generation for 287 years before being deeded to the society by George Franchere. Franchere also gave the society 583 family papers including the deed passed by Daniel Janse Van Antwerpen to Jan Pieterse Mabee on January 29, 1705, and he provided generous financial support for Farm operations for several years after his initial gift. Mr. Franchere, the last in that particular line of Mabees, died in Florida in November 2004, and is buried in Vale Cemetery. In accord with the Franchere will, part of that income was used in 2008 to purchase 27 acres (110,000 m^{2}) of adjacent land from Schenectady County, effectively quadrupling the size of the Farm. The George E. Franchere Educational Center, was completed in October 2011 on part of the newly acquired land, and provides car and bus parking; space for receptions, presentations, and artifact storage; refreshment facilities; classrooms; and offices for Site management. Additionally, in 2009 it acquired 9 acres (36,000 m^{2}) plus from the NY State Canal Corp on the north side of the Mohawk River, to protect the historic viewshed. In the early 2000s, the c. 1760s Nielsen Dutch barn was moved to the site, and is used for programming. Today, the Mabee Farm's collection of 18th-century buildings and ongoing farming practices are demonstrative of life in early rural Schenectady.

In 2017 the Kindl Family of Schenectady donated a property at 14 N Church Street, Schenectady to the society. The historic Brouwer House dates to 1735, and is among the oldest houses in the Stockade neighborhood. The society adapted the historic space into creative studios. In residence at any given point are artists, crafters, musicians, theatre companies, or other local non-profits. Behind Brouwer House Creative is an extensive shade garden.

== Activities ==
The Schenectady County Historical Society offers more than 150 public programs each year, with an annual visitation of 20,000+.

== See also ==
- List of historical societies in New York (state)
