= Rotterdam (CDP), New York =

Rotterdam, New York
- Census-designated place
- Location in Schenectady County and the state of New York.
- Coordinates: 42°46′58″N 73°57′26″W
- Country: United States
- State: New York
- County: Schenectady

Area
  - Total: 8.21 sq mi (21.26 km^{2})
  - Land: 8.20 sq mi (21.25 km^{2})
  - Water: 0.0039 sq mi (0.01 km^{2})
- Elevation: 338 ft (103 m)

Population (2020)
  - Total: 22,968
  - Density: 2,799.6/sq mi (1,080.94/km^{2})
- Time zone: UTC-5 (Eastern (EST))
  - Summer (DST): UTC-4 (EDT)
- ZIP code: 12306
- Area code: 518
- FIPS code: 36-63924
- GNIS feature ID: 0971936

Rotterdam is a census-designated place (CDP) in the town of Rotterdam in Schenectady County, New York, United States. It is a suburb of Schenectady. The population was 22,968 at the 2020 census.

== History ==
Rotterdam was part of the Dutch colony on the eastern seaboard, and is named after Rotterdam, Netherlands, and as such antedates English settlement.

== Geography ==
The Rotterdam CDP, located at 42°46′57″N 73°57′26″W (42.782776, -73.957261), comprises the urban part of the town of Rotterdam, adjacent to the city of Schenectady, which lies to the north and east. The CDP is bordered to the southwest by the New York State Thruway and to the south by the Albany County line. Neighborhoods in the CDP include (from west to east) South Schenectady, Coldbrook, and Carman.

According to the United States Census Bureau, the Rotterdam CDP has a total area of 6.9 mi^{2} (18 km^{2}), all land.

== Demographics ==
Historical population
| Census | Pop. | Note | %± |
|---|---|---|---|
| 2020 | 22,968 | | — |
U.S. Decennial Census

As of the census of 2000, there were 20,536 people, 8,492 households, and 5,876 families residing in the CDP. The population density was 1,144.2 people/km^{2} (2,963 people/mi^{2}). There were 8,825 housing units at an average density of 491.7 units/km^{2} (1,273 units/mi^{2}). The racial makeup of the CDP was 97.07% White, 1.06% Black or African American, 0.16% Native American, 0.55% Asian, 0.02% Pacific Islander, 0.21% from other races, and 0.93% from two or more races. Hispanic or Latino of any race were 1.03% of the population.

There were 8,492 households, out of which 28.7% had children under the age of 18 living with them, 53.5% were married couples living together, 11.6% had a female householder with no husband present, and 30.8% were non-families. 27.0% of all households were made up of individuals, and 14.3% had someone living alone who was 65 years of age or older. The average household size was 2.41 and the average family size was 2.91.

In the CDP, the population was spread out, with 22.9% under the age of 18, 5.6% from 18 to 24, 27.5% from 25 to 44, 22.9% from 45 to 64, and 21.1% who were 65 years of age or older. The median age was 41 years. For every 100 females, there were 91.3 males. For every 100 females age 18 and over, there were 86.4 males.

The median income for a household in the CDP was $43,330, and the median income for a family was $50,681. Males had a median income of $36,958 versus $26,467 for females. The per capita income for the CDP was $20,297. About 3.6% of families and 5.2% of the population were below the poverty line, including 6.7% of those under age 18 and 5.7% of those age 65 or over.
