= Mabee House =

Historic house in New York, United States

- Mabee Farm Historic Site
- U.S. National Register of Historic Places
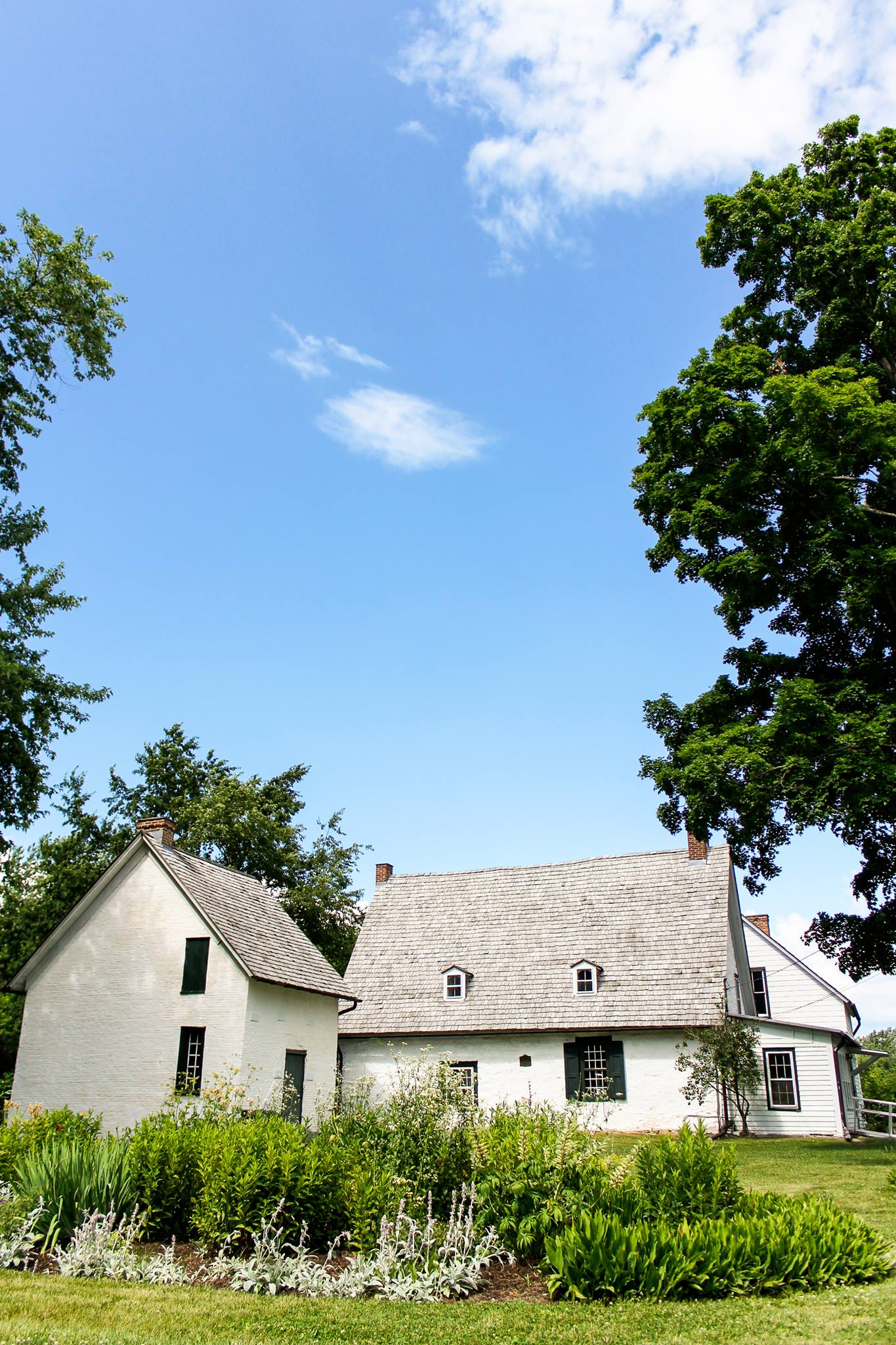
- Mabee House, 2017

- Location within New York Location within the United States
- Interactive map showing the location of Mabee Farm Historic District
- Location: S of Rotterdam Junction on NY 5S, Rotterdam Junction, New York
- Coordinates: 42°51′56″N 74°1′56″W
- Area: 9.6 acres (3.9 ha)
- Built: 1705
- NRHP reference No.: 78001907
- Added to NRHP: May 22, 1978

The Mabee House, on the grounds of the Mabee Farm Historic Site, (part of the Schenectady County Historical Society), is the oldest house still standing in the Mohawk Valley. It is located in the town of Rotterdam, New York, in the hamlet of Rotterdam Junction, New York, along New York State Highway 5S, about six miles (9.7 km) west of the city of Schenectady.

The property includes the original 1705 stone Mabee House, a 1760s brick house, a 1790s inn, a family cemetery and more, sits alongside the banks of the Mohawk River and was donated to the Schenectady County Historical Society on January 29, 1993. An H-bent frame Dutch barn, dating from the 1760s, was acquired from the Nilsen family in 1997, moved from Johnstown, N.Y., restored, and re-installed at the Mabee Farm Historic Site. Various educational programs and events are now offered to the public there. In 2007, 27 acres were purchased from a neighboring property and are now the location of the George E. Franchere Education Center, which opened in 2011.

== History ==
The property was first acquired by Daniel Janse Van Antwerpen in 1671. He purchased the property from the Mohawks and received a grant for the patent in 1680 from the English Governor Edmund Andros. Van Antwerpen, a friend, mentor, and neighbor of Jan Pieterse Mabee and wife Anna Borsboom in the Schenectady's Stockade Historic District, sold the westerly half of the farm property to Jan in 1705/6. The original deed was given to the Schenectady County Historical Society along with 582 other documents and over 1,000 artifacts. The original structures on the farm are the stone house, a frame pre-Erie Canal inn, in which Revolutionary War General Philip Schuyler stayed in 1792 while surveying for the Western Inland Navigation and Lock Company, and the half brick house. The farm's original barns, however, were consumed by fire in the 1870s and 1970s. There is also a family cemetery, which has 21 headstones dating from 1771, and a marker honoring the enslaved people owned by the Mabee family, who lived, worked, and died at the site.

George Franchere, the last descendant of that particular Mabee line to own the House and property, donated the site to the Schenectady County Historical Society in 1993, with the intention that it would be maintained as a museum and educational center. To that end, numerous family members, staff, and volunteers have worked to preserve the property and its donated artifacts, and to develop educational programs and events that present the history of the family, farming, Schenectady County and the Mohawk Valley to visitors.

== Operation as a Historic Site ==
The Jan Mabee and Anna Borsboom House, Brick building, and Inn, on the 9 acres (36,000 m^{2}) of property in Rotterdam Junction, NY were given to the Schenectady County Historical Society by George E. Franchere in 1993, 11 years before he died. In 1996, the Historical Society applied for a matching-funds grant to restore the house, but the grant was denied; the members instead planned a private fundraising campaign. In addition to the west part of the House, which dendrochronology done at Cornell University dates to approximately 1705, making it the oldest known unaltered structure standing in the Mohawk Valley, the site now contains the 1760s Nilsen Dutch Barn, a smaller English barn, and several small outbuildings.

In 2007 the Historical Society acquired 27 acres (110,000 m^{2}) of property adjacent to the site from Schenectady County to construct the George Eugene Franchere Education Center, a three-level 13,000 sq ft (1,200 m^{2}) structure which, completed in 2011, now allows the site to operate year-round. The Franchere Center provides space for rotating history and art exhibits, a 150-seat lecture hall, a conference room, gift shop, and also artifact storage, offices for staff, and work space for interns and volunteers. The building also features geothermal pumps which are powered by the solar panels atop the picnic pavilion. Additionally, in 2009 the Historical Society acquired 9 acres from NY State Canal Corporation across (north side) the Mohawk river, to protect its historic viewshed.

The site borders the south side of Mohawk River (now also the New York State Barge Canal), and the Farm's dock serves as the home base for two bateaux, the De Sager and the Bobbie G, specially constructed by the Alplaus Maritime Academy for the Mabee Farm. The Onrust was built here from 2006 to 2009 in time for the Quadricentennial of Henry Hudson's voyage to what became New Netherland.

The Mabee Farm Historic Site is open year-round to visitors for guided tours through the historic structures, and/or for self-guided visits through the exhibits on display in the Franchere Center. The site welcomes over 15,000 annually.
