= John Doxtader =

Loyalist in the American Revolution (1760–1801)

John Doxtader (1760–1801) was a Loyalist in the American Revolution and an officer in British forces. He is best known for commanding the "Invasion of Currytown" in the Mohawk Valley on July 9, 1781. His name is variously spelled Dachstädter, Dachsteder, Docksteder, Dochsteder, etc.

== Personal ==
John (Johannes) Doxtader was born in Stone Arabia, Province of New York (now the Town of Palatine, New York) on December 4, 1760 to Hendrick and Maria Magdalena Dachsteder. The Doxstaders were one of a number of families of German Palatines who settled in the Mohawk Valley from 1708. His younger brother, Frederick Docksteder, would later become a sergeant in William Caldwell's company of Butler's Rangers. Sometime after 1783 John married a woman named Sarah (or Sally, last name unknown), and had at least three sons and two daughters.

== American Revolution ==
In 1776 Doxtader declined to support the Patriot cause and was ordered to be sent to Albany for imprisonment.

In Committee Tyron County June 19th 1776: The following persons refusing to sign the Association ordered by this Committee viz.--- Donald Cameron, Barnabas Cain, Jacob Merckell, Henry Merckell Jr., Dederick Loucks, Godfrey Syphert, Hendrick Dillenbach, Christian Dillenbach Jr., and John Dochsteder. They are judged inimical to the Liberties of America and dangerous to remain in the Country and are ordered together with John Jarris and John Meyers to be sent down to Albany to be disposed of as General Schuyler shall direct. Ordered that Capt. W. Keen send an officer with a party of Men to guard the above named persons to Albany. By Order of the Committee John Frey Chairman, In Committee met at Stonearaby May 11th, 1777, Jacob Snell Chairman, John Eisenlord Esq. Secry., Palatine.

He was freed or escaped in 1777 and joined the Loyalist forces, becoming an officer in the Indian Department, and was sent as an agent to the Cayuga.

== Invasion of Currytown ==
see main article: Burning of Curryown

On July 9, 1781 Doxtader commanded a force of five hundred Indians and Loyalists in an attack on the frontier settlement of Currytown, in the present-day town of Root, Montgomery County, New York. The town was burned, a number of inhabitants were killed, and nine prisoners were taken.

Simms says that a small block house had been erected near his dwelling and picketed in. This more than once afforded a refuge for the settlers in the vicinity. The settlement was invaded by a party of Indians and Tories under Capt. John Doxstader, July 9, 1781. When they arrived about ten o'clock in the morning, "Rudolph Keller, Henry Lewis and Conrad Enders (Antes) were the only men in the fort. Frederick Lewis and Henry Lewis, Jr., were among the first to gain the fort; the former fired three successive guns to warn the settlers of danger, and several thus seasonably warned found a safe retreat in the forest. ... The Indians plundered and burnt all the buildings in the settlement, a dozen or more in number, except the house of David Lewis

The invaders were driven out by forces commanded by Colonel Marinus Willett.

There was one very painful circumstance attending this battle. In their excursion to Currietown, the day before, Doxstader and his Indians had made nine prisoners, among whom were Jacob and Frederick Diefendorff, Jacob Myers and a son, a black boy, and four others. The moment the battle commenced, the prisoners, who were bound to standing trees for security, were tomahawked and scalped by their captors, and left as dead. The bodies of these unfortunate men were buried by Colonel Willett's troops. Fortunately, however, the graves were superficial, and the covering slight-a circumstance which enabled Jacob Diefendorff, who, though stunned and apparently dead, was yet alive, to disentomb himself. A detachment of militia, under Colonel Veeder, having repaired to the field of action after Willett had returned to Fort Rensselaer, discovered the supposed deceased on the outside of his own grave; and he has lived to furnish the author of the present work with an account of his own burial and resurrection.

== Later life ==
John Doxtader died at Grand River, in Upper Canada on February 27, 1801.

== See also ==
- Cherry Valley massacre
- Battle of Johnstown
