= Minaville, New York =

- Hamlet
- Location within New York Location within the United States
- Coordinates: 42°53′09″N 74°12′59″W
- Country: United States
- State: New York
- County: Montgomery
- Town: Florida
- Elevation: 571 ft (174 m)
- Time zone: UTC-5 (Eastern (EST))
  - Summer (DST): UTC-4 (EDT)
- Area code: 518

Minaville is a hamlet in the town of Florida in Montgomery County, New York, United States. It is located on New York State Route 30 (NY 30).
