= Rotterdam, New York =

- Town
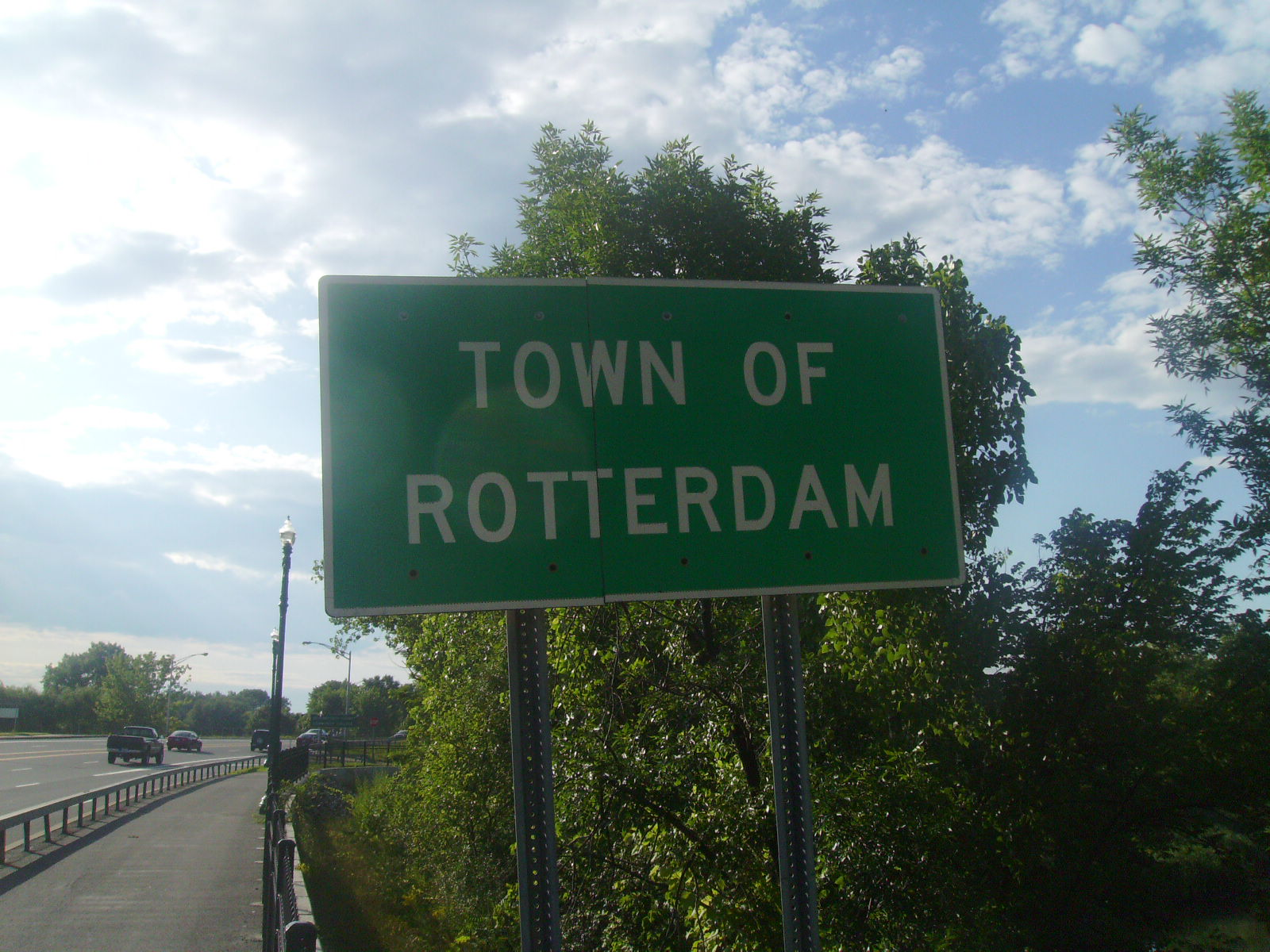
- Entering Rotterdam on New York State Route 5

- Location in Schenectady County and the state of New York.
- Coordinates: 42°47′12″N 73°58′15″W
- Country: United States
- State: New York
- County: Schenectady
- Settled: 1661
- Established: 1820
- Named for: Rotterdam, Netherlands

Government
  - Type: Town board
  - Town Supervisor: John Polimeni (C)

Area
  - Total: 36.45 sq mi (94.40 km^{2})
  - Land: 35.68 sq mi (92.42 km^{2})
  - Water: 0.77 sq mi (1.99 km^{2})
- Elevation: 512 ft (156 m)

Population (2020)
  - Total: 30,523
- Time zone: UTC-5 (Eastern (EST))
  - Summer (DST): UTC-4 ((EDT))
- ZIP code: 12306 or 12303
- Area code: 518
- FIPS code: 36-63935
- GNIS feature ID: 979437
- Website: www.townofrotterdam.gov

Rotterdam is a town in Schenectady County, New York, United States. The population was 30,523 at the 2020 census.

Rotterdam is in the south-central part of the county. It was founded in 1661 by Dutch settlers, who named it after the city of Rotterdam in the Netherlands, where many immigrants last touched European grounds. The town borders the city of Schenectady.

== History ==
Situated near the eastern end of New York State's Heritage Corridor at what is known as the "Gateway to the West", the town of Rotterdam is closely linked with the early development of Schenectady. At that time the present town of Rotterdam served as the outlying farmlands and wood lots for the settlers. With few exceptions, these settlers made their homes in the stockade in Schenectady but went to their farmlands during the daytime.

The lands now known as Rotterdam became Schenectady's third ward when that city was incorporated in 1798. Rotterdam retained that status when the county of Schenectady was chartered in 1809. During this period, a council of aldermen and assistants from each of the four wards governed the city of Schenectady. In May 1819, the city council recommended that the third and fourth wards be separated out as towns, and on December 31, a petition to the state legislature was drafted. The legislation was passed on April 14, 1820, the final day of the legislative session, creating the town of Rotterdam.

Designated as a town of the first class in 1942, Rotterdam has since adopted the Old World Rotterdam coat of arms along with the motto Sterker door Strijd (Stronger through Effort).

The Dellemont-Wemple Farm was added to the National Register of Historic Places in 1973, and the Enlarged Double Lock No. 23, Old Erie Canal in 2008.

The Mabee House, at the Mabee Farm Historic Site, the oldest surviving house in the Mohawk Valley, was added to the National Register of Historic Places May 22, 1978. It is a property of the Schenectady County Historical Society, being donated by a last descendant in his particular line, Mr. George Eugene Franchere, on January 29, 1993, the 287th anniversary of the original deed. It is currently being operated as a living history museum, conducts school programs, and events for the public.

Rotterdam has a long history with baseball. For many years, they produced teams that would do well in the little league tournaments and Babe Ruth tournaments. One of those teams would go on to win a national championship in the latter.

In August 1977, the all star team Carman little league (one of the little league organizations within the town, now referred to as RC little league) would go on to qualify for the little league World Series in Williamsport, Pennsylvania. They would go on to finish 4th.

3 years later in 1980, the same boys from that Carman team, along with a few mixed in from Rotterdam little league (the other little league organization in the town at the time) would become Babe Ruth World Series champions. They clawed their way out of the losers bracket to defeat Hawaii in 2 games in one day for the title. The tournament took place in Williston, North Dakota.

Years later in 2014, a team from the Rotterdam Babe Ruth League went on to go to the semifinals in the Mid-Atlantic Regional Baseball Tournament. Rotterdam is also the home of a large Net Zero housing complex.

== Geography ==
The Mohawk River defines the northeast town line. The New York State Thruway passes through the town.

According to the United States Census Bureau, the town has a total area of 36.4 square miles (94.4 km^{2}), of which 35.7 square miles (92.4 km^{2}) is land and 0.77 square miles (2.0 km^{2}), or 2.11%, is water.

=== Communities and locations in Rotterdam ===
- Antonia Hills – A small development off of Route 7; built by the Valentine Family.
- Colonial Manor – A well-sized community between Cold Brook and South Schenectady, with housing developed in the 1950s by Charles Juracka.
- Carman – A relatively small community anchored by Carman Park.
- Cold Brook – A well-sized suburban community placed on the former Campbell Family estate.
- Colonial Manor – A fairly large, middle-class suburban development covering an area of about .54 square miles. The development's school districts are mixed, with some streets attending Schalmont High School and others attending Mohonasen High School.
- Eldorado Acres
- Gallucci Gardens; A cul-de-sac with a handful of single-family detached homes, and 3-4 Tudor homes and a few colonial homes.
- Lower Rotterdam Junction – A hamlet south of Rotterdam Junction on Route 5S.
- Pattersonville – A hamlet in the northern part of the town on the town line.
- Rotterdam – A large suburban community west of Schenectady.
- Schonowe
- Serafini Gardens – A medium-sized development on the border of Guilderland and Rotterdam. Contains 50-75 homes.
- South Schenectady
- Skyline – Development sitting on a hill overlooking Rotterdam, with about 15-20 homes.
- Sunrise Estates/Caroline Manor

The official New York State Gazetteer, which is maintained and published by the New York State Department of Health, includes numerous defunct hamlets and towns in the state, some with alternate or archaic spellings. The Gazetteer lists several now-defunct hamlets that were located within Rotterdam: Athens Junction, Mohawkville, Rynex Corners, and Woodlawn.

== Demographics ==
Historical population
Census	Pop.	Note	%±
1820	1,529		—
1830	1,480		−3.2%
1840	2,284		54.3%
1850	2,446		7.1%
1860	2,224		−9.1%
1870	2,355		5.9%
1880	2,326		−1.2%
1890	3,098		33.2%
1900	7,711		148.9%
1910	5,406		−29.9%
1920	7,853		45.3%
1930	9,920		26.3%
1940	12,560		26.6%
1950	19,762		57.3%
1960	27,493		39.1%
1970	31,067		13.0%
1980	29,451		−5.2%
1990	28,395		−3.6%
2000	28,316		−0.3%
2010	29,094		2.7%
2020	30,523		4.9%
U.S. Decennial Census 2010, 2020

As of the census of 2000, there were 28,316 people, 11,544 households, and 8,092 families residing in the town. The population density was 787.0 inhabitants per square mile (303.9/km^{2}). There were 11,990 housing units at an average density of 333.3 per square mile (128.7/km^{2}). The racial makeup of the town was 97.26% White, 0.95% Black or African American, 0.16% Native American, 0.57% Asian, 0.01% Pacific Islander, 0.21% from other races, and 0.83% from two or more races. Hispanic or Latino of any race were 0.97% of the population.

There were 11,544 households, out of which 29.4% had children under the age of 18 living with them, 55.7% were married couples living together, 10.6% had a female householder with no husband present, and 29.9% were non-families. 25.8% of all households were made up of individuals, and 12.6% had someone living alone who was 65 years of age or older. The average household size was 2.44 and the average family size was 2.94.

In the town, the population was spread out, with 23.1% under the age of 18, 5.8% from 18 to 24, 27.9% from 25 to 44, 24.1% from 45 to 64, and 19.1% who were 65 years of age or older. The median age was 41 years. For every 100 females, there were 92.9 males. For every 100 females age 18 and over, there were 88.5 males.

The median income for a household in the town was $46,267, and the median income for a family was $54,542. Males had a median income of $37,536 versus $27,527 for females. The per capita income for the town was $21,457. About 2.8% of families and 4.5% of the population were below the poverty line, including 5.2% of those under age 18 and 5.9% of those age 65 or over.

== Government ==
The Rotterdam Town Board consists of five members, including the supervisor who is a voting member.

Supervisor- John Polimeni (C)

Deputy Supervisor- Michael DeSantis (R)

Board Member- Ron Schlag (R)

Board Member- Patricia Matelitz (R)

Board Member- Teri A. Galucci (R)

== See also ==
- Rotterdam (CDP), New York
- Pattersonville-Rotterdam Junction, New York
