= Randall, New York =

- Hamlet
- Location within New York Location within the United States
- Coordinates: 42°54′41″N 074°26′40″W
- Country: United States
- State: New York
- County: Montgomery
- Town: Root
- Elevation: 302 ft (92 m)
- Time zone: UTC-7 (Eastern (MST))
  - Summer (DST): UTC-7 (MST)
- Area code: 518
- FIPS code: 04-60543
- GNIS feature ID: 962166

Randall is a populated place situated in Montgomery County, New York, United States. It is a hamlet in the northeastern part of the town of Root on New York State Route 5S. Randall has an estimated elevation of 302 feet (92 m) above sea level.

The area where Randall is now was originally named Yatesville. The name of Randall was adopted in 1863, at the suggestion of the first postmaster.
