= Sprakers, New York =

- hamlet
- Location within New York Location within the United States
- Coordinates: 42°53′29″N 74°30′48″W
- Country: United States
- State: New York
- County: Montgomery
- Town: Root
- Elevation: 302 ft (92 m)
- Time zone: UTC-5 (Eastern (EST))
  - Summer (DST): UTC-4 (EDT)
- ZIP code: 12166
- Area code: 518
- GNIS feature ID: 966043

Sprakers (/ˈspreɪkərz/ SPRAY-kərz) is a hamlet in the town of Root, Montgomery County, New York, United States. Its ZIP Code is 12166.

== Notable people ==
- Jessica Friesen, race car driver
- Stewart Friesen, race car driver
- George A. Mitchell, founder of Cadillac, Michigan
