= Rural Grove, New York =

- Hamlet
- Location within New York Location within the United States
- Coordinates: 42°50′53″N 74°26′27″W
- Country: United States
- State: New York
- County: Montgomery
- Town: Root
- Elevation: 935 ft (285 m)
- Time zone: UTC-5 (Eastern (EST))
  - Summer (DST): UTC-4 (EDT)
- Area code: 518

Rural Grove is a hamlet in the town of Root in Montgomery County, New York, United States. It is located on New York State Route 162.
