= South Chuctanunda Creek =

- Location of the mouth within New York South Chuctanunda Creek (the United States)

Location
- Country: United States
- State: New York
- Counties: Montgomery, Schenectady

Physical characteristics
- Source
  - coordinates: 42°50′01″N 74°07′32″W
- Mouth: Mohawk River
  - location: Amsterdam
  - coordinates: 42°56′12″N 74°11′55″W
  - elevation: 255 ft (78 m)
- Basin size: 32.4 sq mi (84 km^{2})

South Chuctanunda Creek is a river in Montgomery and Schenectady counties in the state of New York. It flows into the Mohawk River in Amsterdam.

== History ==
On July 3, 1985, Congress approved a project at Amsterdam for work to be done on the Mohawk River and South Chuctanunda Creek. South Chuctanunda Creek was cleared at the upstream end of the project for approximately 950 feet (290 m). New flood walls were installed along the right bank of South Chuctanunda Creek and the Mohawk River. A new wing wall was installed on the left bank of South Chuctanunda Creek at the upstream end of the New York Central Railroad Bridge. The South Chuctanunda was realigned and reshaped for approximately 1,056 feet (322 m) and riprap was added where needed. The existing channel of the South Chuctanunda was slightly reshaped downstream of the Florida Avenue bridge. Construction plans for the project were issued on November 15, 1962. Construction work began on February 25, 1963, with construction being completed on June 4, 1965. The flood walls protect the city of Amsterdam from floods of 122,500 cu ft/s (3,470 m^{3}/s) from the Mohawk River and floods of 3,400 cu ft/s (96 m^{3}/s) from South Chuctanunda Creek. The floodwalls were able to prevent $13.6 million in damages from tropical storms Lee and Irene. In July 2012, governor Cuomo announced a project to improve the flood walls on South Chuctanunda Creek and Mohawk River. The floodwalls and river banks were repaired at a cost of $164,248.
