= Auries Creek =

- Location of the mouth within New York Auries Creek (the United States)

Location
- Country: United States
- State: New York

Physical characteristics
- Mouth: Mohawk River
  - location: Auriesville, New York
  - coordinates: 42°55′58″N 74°18′54″W
  - elevation: 274 ft (84 m)
- Basin size: 25.9 sq mi (67 km^{2})

Auries Creek flows into the Mohawk River in Auriesville, New York.
