= Sloansville, New York =

- Hamlet
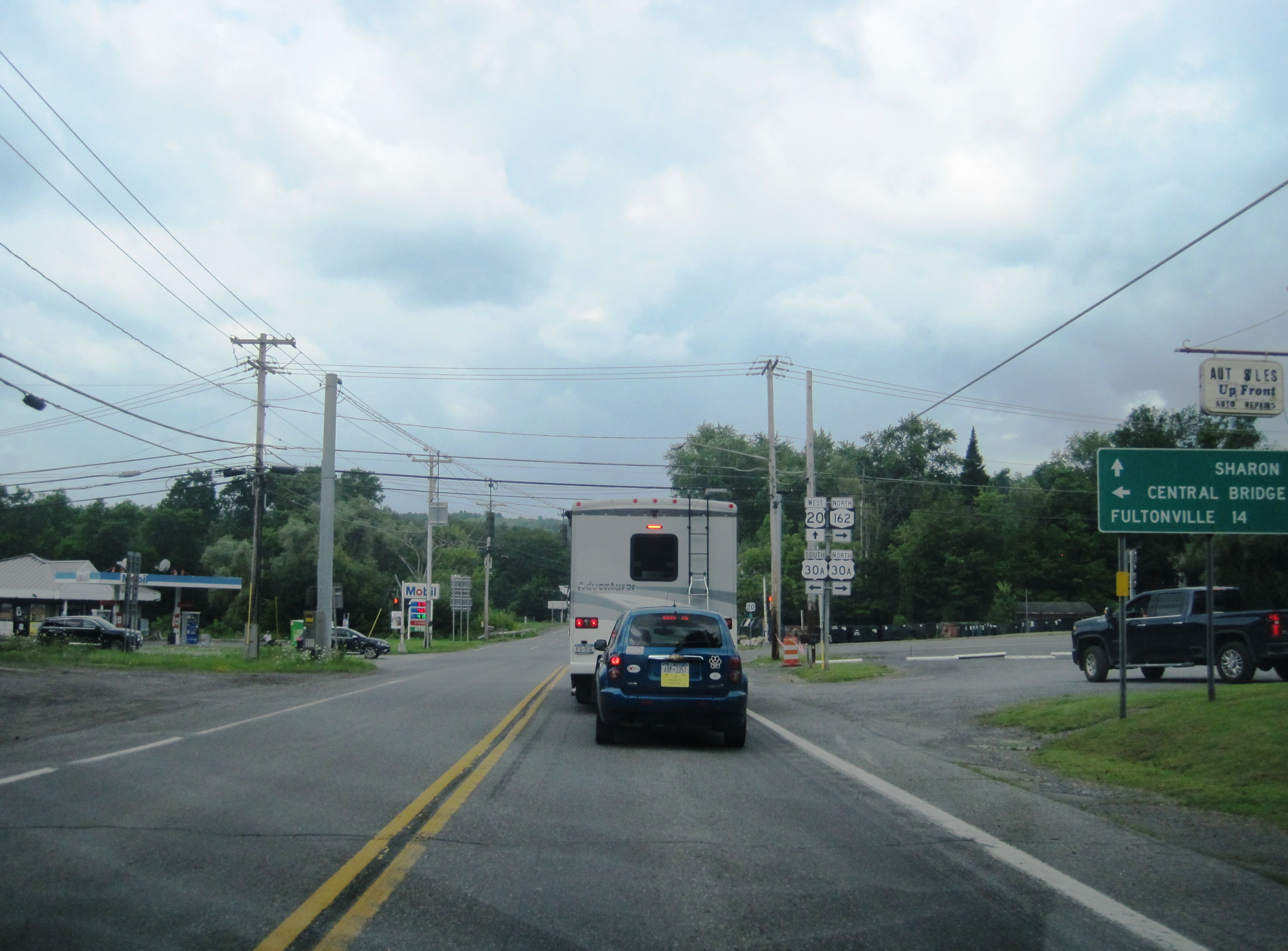
- Westbound US 20 at NY 30A in Sloansville

- Location within New York Location within the United States
- Coordinates: 42°45′25″N 74°19′49″W
- Country: United States
- State: New York
- County: Schoharie
- Elevation: 679 ft (207 m)
- Time zone: UTC-5 (Eastern (EST))
  - Summer (DST): UTC-4 (EDT)
- ZIP code: 12160
- Area codes: 518 & 838
- GNIS feature ID: 965430

Sloansville is a hamlet in Schoharie County, New York, United States. The community is located at the intersection of U.S. Route 20, New York State Route 30A, and New York State Route 162, 3.8 miles (6.1 km) west of Esperance. Sloansville has a post office with ZIP code 12160, which opened on March 13, 1818.
