= Henry Hilton =

American jurist and businessman

Henry Hilton (October 4, 1824 – August 24, 1899) was an American jurist and businessman. He became best known for the so-called "Hilton–Seligman Affair" in 1877, his refusal to admit financier Joseph Seligman to the Grand Union Hotel in Saratoga Springs, New York (no relation to Hilton Hotels & Resorts), reportedly because Seligman was Jewish, but also possibly because of a personal feud.

== Biography ==
Hilton was born in Newburgh, New York on October 4, 1824, the youngest son of a Scottish immigrant. He moved as a boy to New York City and was educated there. He became a law clerk with the firm of Campbell & Cleveland in 1839. He was admitted to practice at the Court of Common Pleas in 1846, and later served as a Master in Chancery. In 1870, "Boss Tweed" appointed him to the Board of Commissioners of Central Park.

Campbell & Cleveland represented A.T. Stewart, "The Merchant Prince," and Hilton became Stewart's private counsel in 1850. In the 1850s Hilton married Ellen Banker, a cousin of Mrs. Stewart and the sister of James H. Banker, President of the Bank of New York. He was a judge of the Court of Common Pleas from 1858 to 1863, and also served as Parks Commissioner for a time. In 1862 he is listed on the rolls of the Tammany Society.

Mr. Stewart died in 1876, and Hilton served as his executor, receiving a bequest of one million dollars for his services, which Mrs. Stewart paid by transferring the business of A.T. Stewart to him. In 1886 Mrs. Stewart died and Hilton again served as executor. Judge Hilton retired from A.T. Stewart in 1883. There are two different accounts of his success in business. According to his biography, "he was entirely successful, and when he retired in 1883 ... his sons and son-in-law succeeded to the business and soon dissipated the property." According to the New York Times, however, Hilton presided over "the dissipation of one of the greatest fortunes ever amassed by trade."

== Woodlawn ==
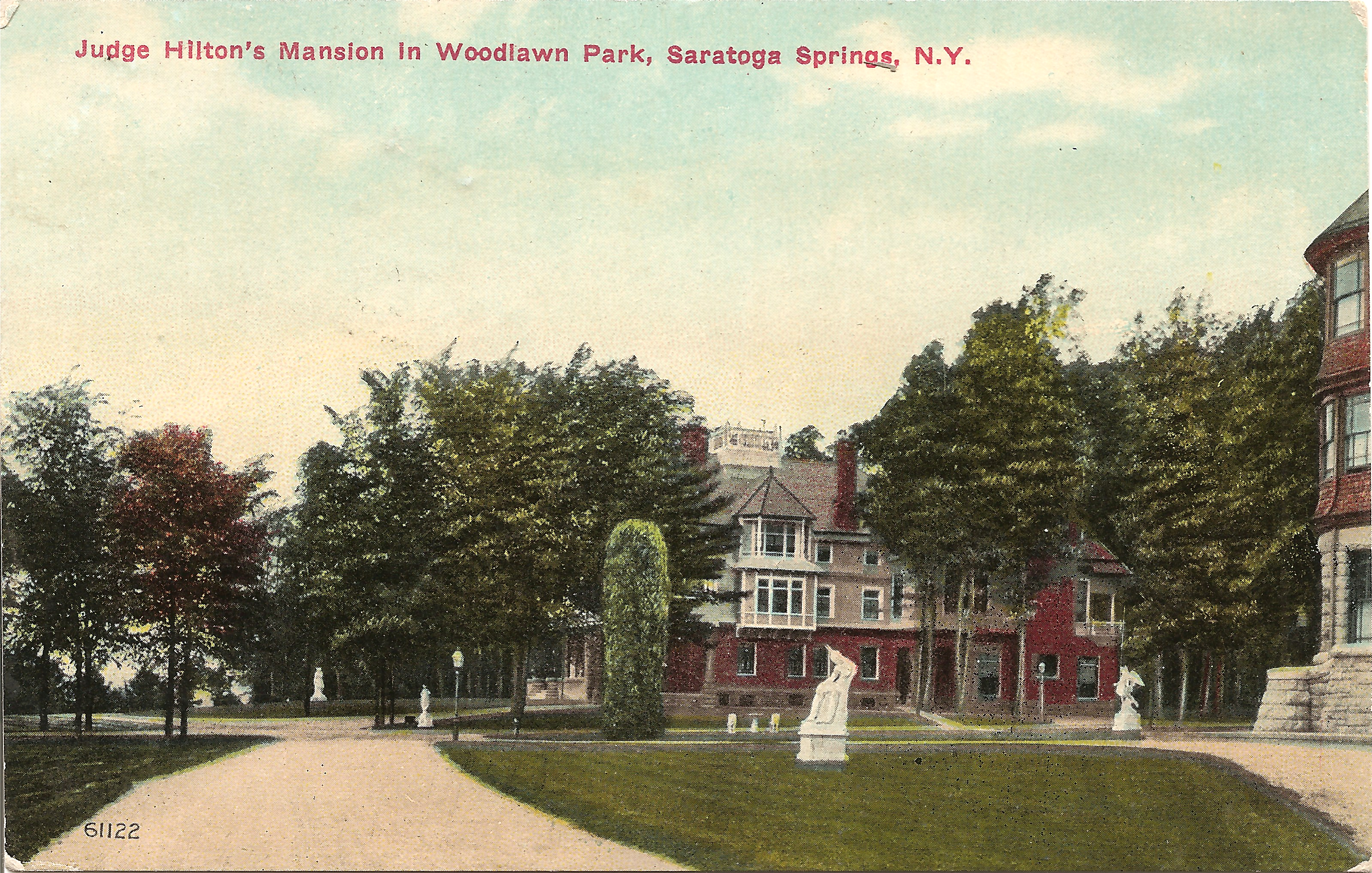
The Mansion at Woodlawn Park

In 1879 Hilton bought an estate named "Woodlawn" in Saratoga Springs from Henry Walton. The estate, which Hilton renamed "Woodlawn Park", comprised 1,500 acres (610 ha) of woods and meadows. Hilton improved the property, laying out 25 miles (40 km) of graveled carriage roads, a great mansion, stables, barns, gardens, lakes, a club house, a ballroom, and an athletic field.

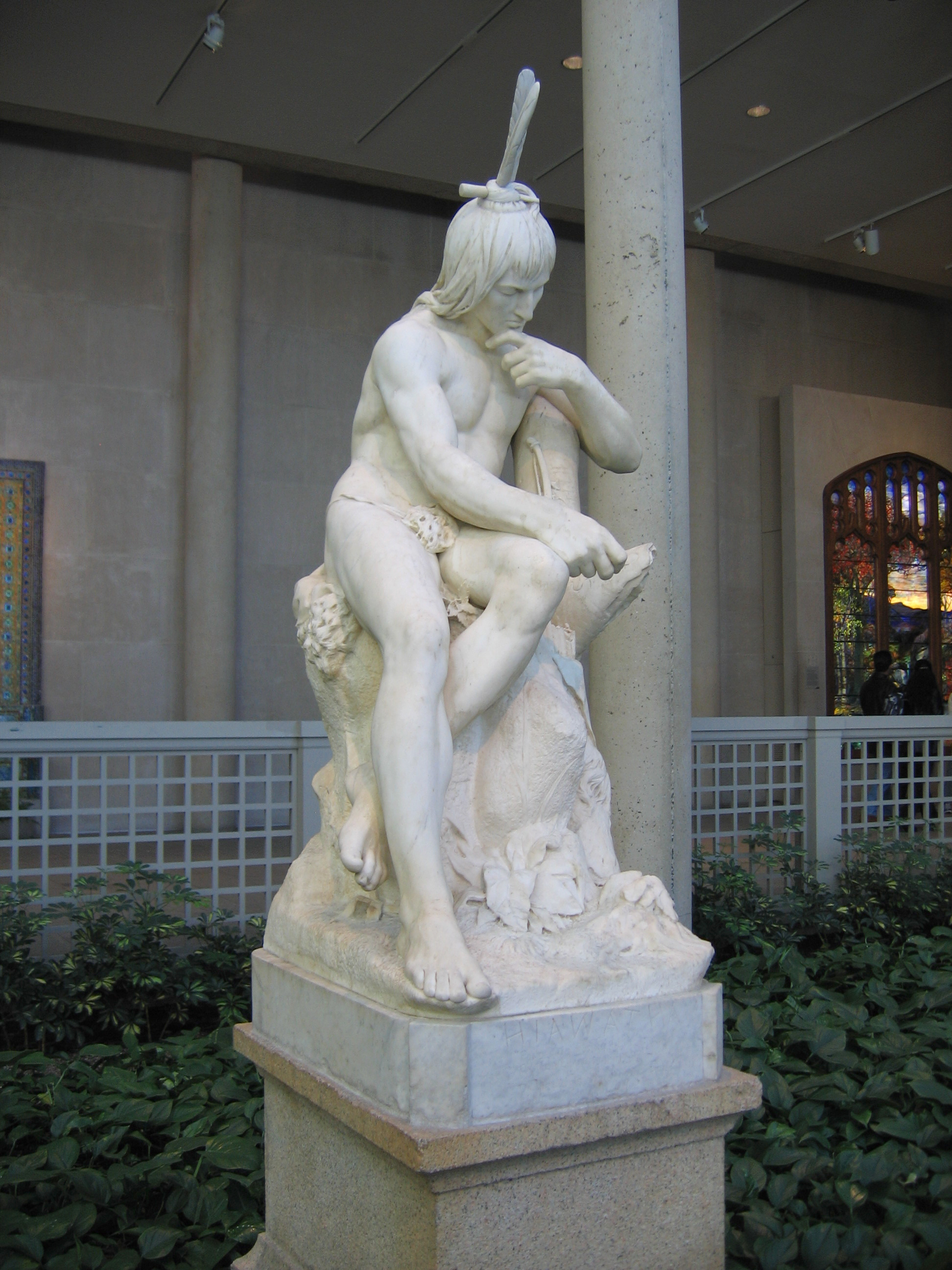

Augustus Saint-Gaudens's Hiawatha stood in front of the house. The grounds were open to members of the public with permission from Judge Hilton. Hilton died at Woodlawn on August 24, 1899, "after a long illness." Following Hilton's death the property was left to decay, and was auctioned off as eight parcels in 1916. A portion of Woodlawn is now the campus of Skidmore College. Hilton is interred at Green-Wood Cemetery in Brooklyn, New York.

== Hawkins controversy ==
In May 1871, workers broke into the workshop of British artist Benjamin Waterhouse Hawkins in Central Park. Among other things, they destroyed a plaster skeleton of a Hadrosaur, modeled after the first dinosaur fossil unearthed in New Jersey 13 years earlier, and a statue of the dinosaur as it might have appeared in life. Hawkins' work was intended to be the focal point of a Paleozoic Museum in the park. Originally "Boss" Tweed was blamed for the destruction, but it now appears that Hilton acted on his own, possibly seeing the Paleozoic Museum as competition for the planned American Museum of Natural History. This vandalism was one of many strange acts perpetrated by Hilton, as he had a habit of whitewashing priceless artifacts, and believed that Hawkins' fascination with what he considered to be "dead animals" pointless considering that "there was enough to do among the living". As a result of the destruction, the museum was never built.
