= Dinosaurs Don't Die =

1970 British children's book

- First edition cover
- Author: Ann Coates
- Illustrator: John Vernon Lord
- Publisher: Prentice Hall Press
- Publication date: November 16, 1970
- ISBN: 978-0-582-15757-6

Dinosaurs Don't Die is a 1970 British children's book by Ann Coates and illustrated by John Vernon Lord. It tells the story of a young boy, Daniel, who lives opposite the Sydenham Hill park in South London where the Crystal Palace was moved after the Great Exhibition. At night the boy notices that some of the Crystal Palace Dinosaurs, models created by sculptor Benjamin Waterhouse Hawkins, come to life. He befriends an Iguanodon he names "Rock".

Hawkins' models of the Iguanodon mistakenly portray the large thumb spike as a nose horn; also, the dinosaurs are shown as quadrupeds rather than bipeds and these mistakes are faithfully reproduced in the book. The book is no longer in print.

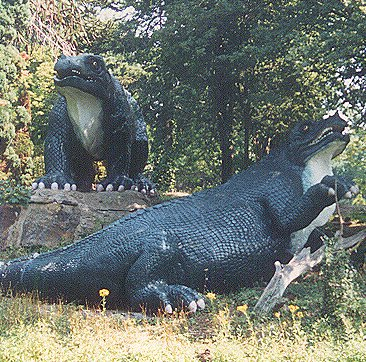
Hawkins' Iguanadons come to life in Ann Coates' book
