= Putney Lower Common Cemetery =

Public park and old cemetery in Putney, London

Coordinates: 51°28′10″N 0°13′56″W

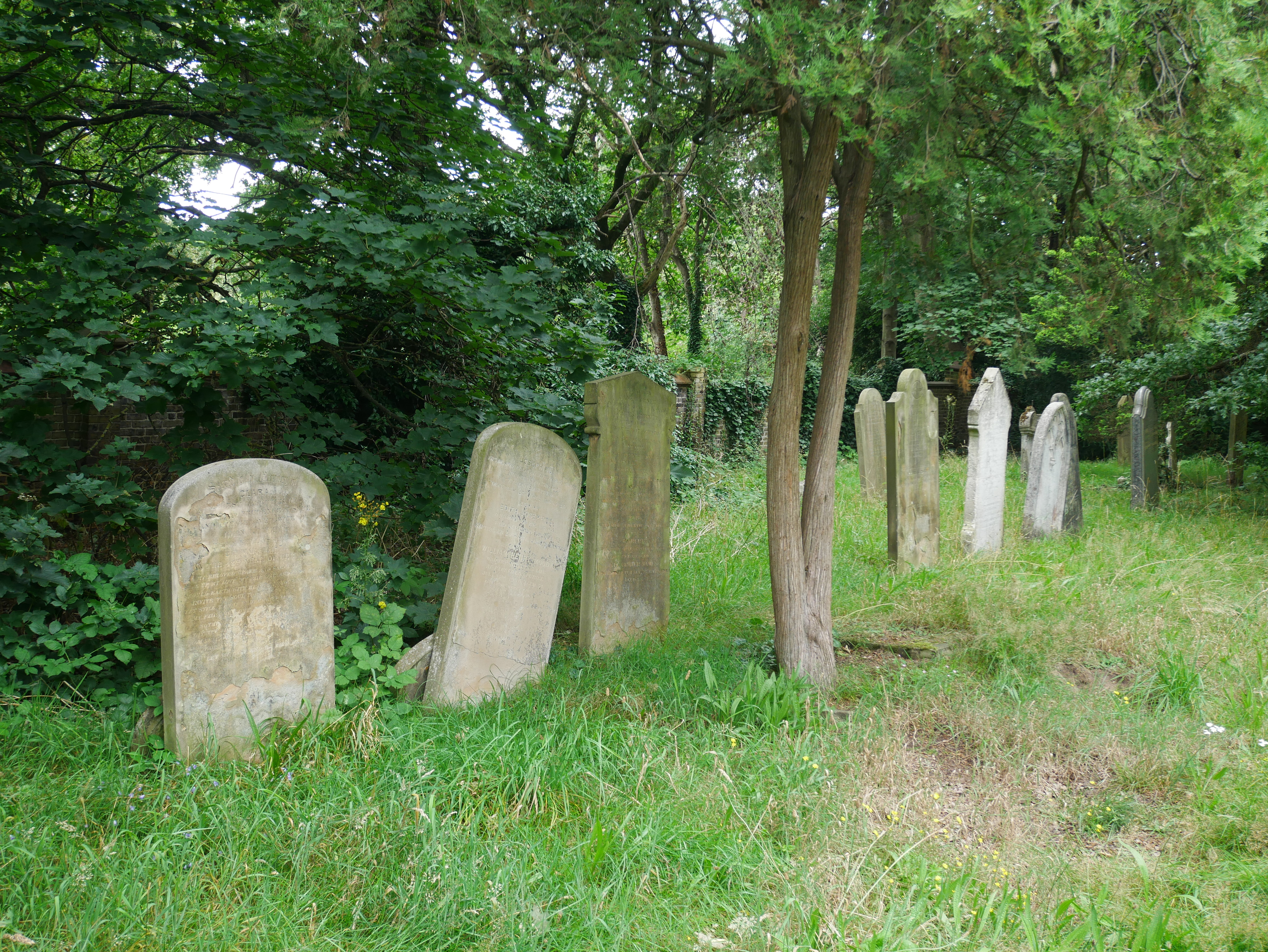
Putney Lower Common Cemetery

Putney Lower Common Cemetery is a cemetery on the edge of the London Borough of Wandsworth between Putney and Barnes town centres.

== Geography ==
The cemetery has an area of 1.21ha and is the second smallest in Wandsworth, the smallest being Putney Old Burial Ground at 0.34ha. It lies on the north side of Mill Hill road (B349) between the junctions with Rocks Lane (A306) and Queen's Ride/Lower Richmond road (B306). The north and west boundary walls border with Barnes Common and the east wall borders with Putney Lower Common.

== History ==
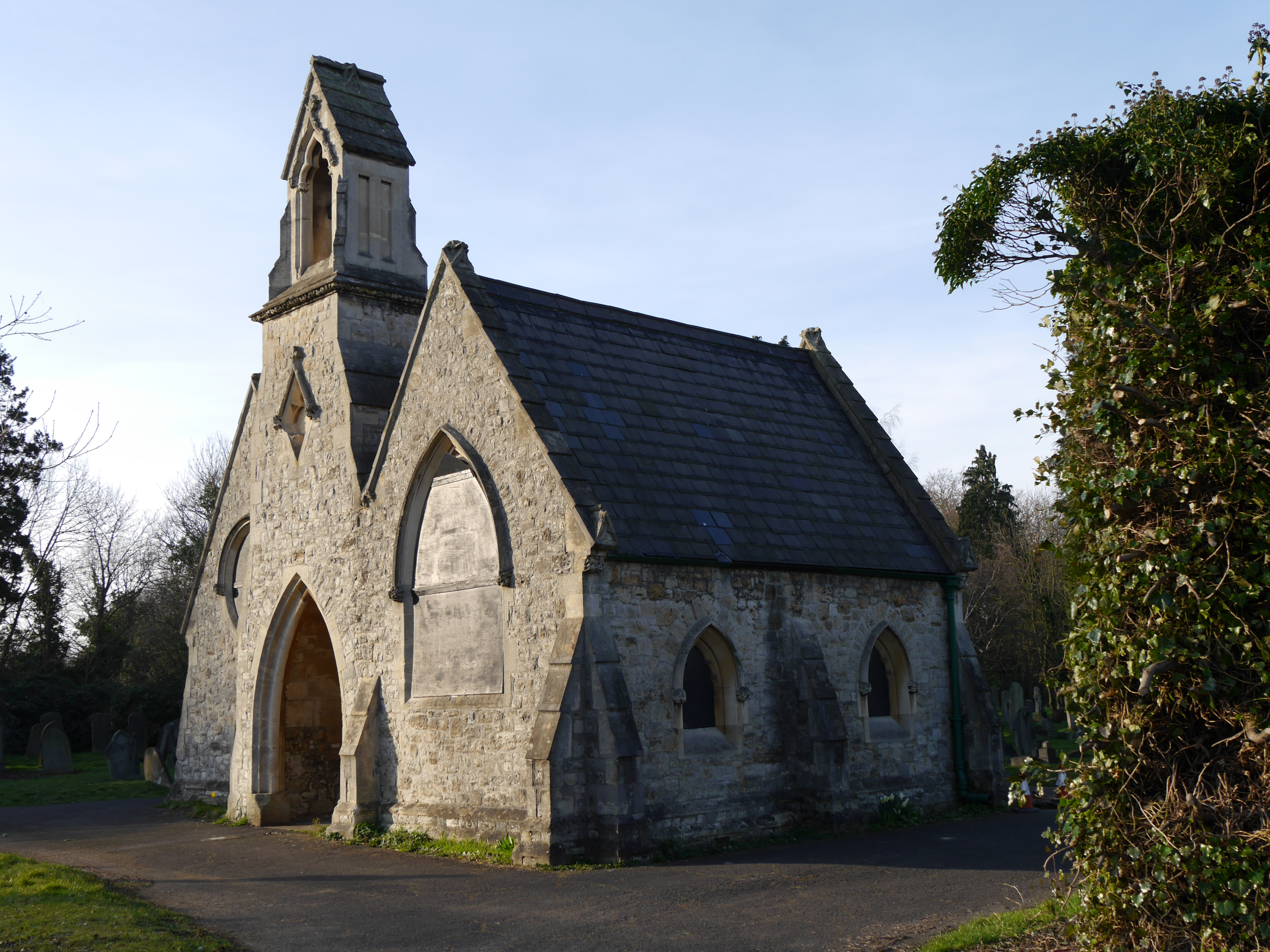
Putney Lower Common Cemetery chapel

The cemetery was laid out from 1855 on three acres of land from the estate of Earl Spencer; it was opened in 1855. The chapel building, lodge on the south east corner and brick boundary wall were designed by Barnett and Birch and built by W and R Aviss, who also have a family tomb on the site.

In 1891 the cemetery officially closed when Putney Vale Cemetery opened, but burials continued until much later with the last one being in the 1970s.

The Friends of Lower Putney Common Cemetery are a charity that 'monitor the condition of the Putney Lower Common Cemetery in the hope of providing funds for any future restoration'. In 2017 they raised money with a concert at The Half Moon pub for restoration work to be carried out on the chapel building which was in a dilapidated state. The work was designed by Roger Mears architects and the chapel was converted into a private dwelling. The project was a runner up in the 2019/2020 Alliance for Sustainable Building Products awards and a Gold Winner in the Built Environment Architects category at the 2019 International Green Apple Awards for the Built Environment and Architectural Heritage.

== Features and notable burials ==
There are five Commonwealth War Graves Commission graves in the cemetery of casualties of the First World War, buried between 1916 and 1918.

The cemetery also includes the graves of sculpturer Benjamin Waterhouse Hawkins (1807–1894) who designed and sculpted the dinosaurs in Crystal Palace Park, the historian Louis Charles Alexander (1839–1913) who was editor of The Autobiography of Shakespeare – A Fragment in 1911 and involved in the founding of the Royal Historical Society in 1868, cricketer and barrister Sir Alfred Dryden (1821–1912) who was a descendant of poet John Dryden, merchant banker John Frederick Flemmich (1819–1892) who was in business with German art collector Frederick Huth, and solicitor and property developer Henry Scarth (1802–70) who built The Arab Boy and the former Quill pubs and the residential Parkfields area in Putney.

== Wildlife ==
There are several mature trees in the cemetery and the tombstones provide habitats for mosses, lichens and stonecrops.

Hedgehog tunnels were added to the boundary walls in 2021, these enable the animals to roam around the cemetery and surrounding commons and help increase their chance of reproducing.

== Transport ==
There are parking spaces on Mill Hill Road, just outside the cemetery gates. The park is served by Transport for London buses 22, 265 and 284 which stop on at the Commondale stop on the Lower Richmond Road. Barnes railway station (Southwestern Railway) is a ten-minute walk from the park.
