= Benjamin Waterhouse Hawkins =

English sculptor and natural history artist (1807–1894)

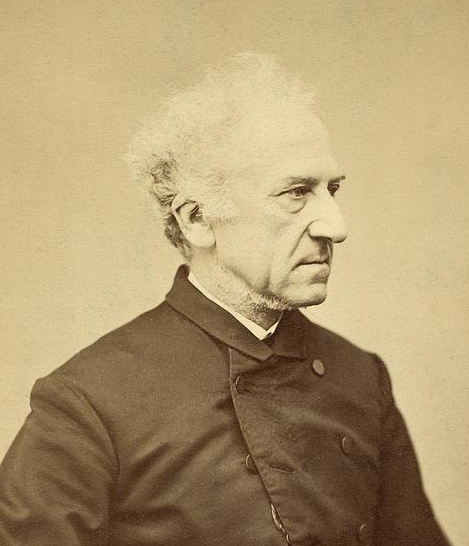
- Portrait of Hawkins
- Born: 8 February 1807; Devonshire Street, London, England
- Died: 27 January 1894 (aged 86); Putney, London, England
- Resting place: Putney Lower Common Cemetery
- Education: St. Aloysius College
- Notable work: Crystal Palace Dinosaurs
- Awards: Member of the Society of Arts; Fellow of the Linnean Society; Fellow of the Geological Society of London

Benjamin Waterhouse Hawkins (8 February 1807 – 27 January 1894) was an English sculptor and natural history artist renowned for his work on the life-size models of dinosaurs in the Crystal Palace Park in south London. The models, accurately made using the latest scientific knowledge, created a sensation at the time. Hawkins was also a noted lecturer on zoological topics.

== Education and early career ==
Benjamin Waterhouse Hawkins was born on Devonshire Street in London on 8 February 1807, the son of artist Thomas Hawkins and his wife Louisa Anna Waterhouse. His maternal grandfather, William Waterhouse, was a plantation owner in Jamaica.

Hawkins, who styled himself Waterhouse Hawkins or B. Waterhouse Hawkins, studied at St. Aloysius College, and learned sculpture from William Behnes. At the age of 20, he began to study natural history and later geology. He contributed illustrations to The Zoology of the Voyage of HMS Beagle.

During the 1840s, he produced studies of living animals in Knowsley Park, near Liverpool for Edward Stanley, 13th Earl of Derby. The park was one of the largest private menageries in Victorian England and Hawkins' work was later published with John Edward Gray's text as "Gleanings from the Menagerie at Knowsley" . Over the same period Hawkins exhibited four sculptures at the Royal Academy between 1847 and 1849, and was elected a member of the Society of Arts in 1846 and a fellow of the Linnean Society in 1847. Fellowship of the Geological Society of London followed in 1854.

== Great Exhibition ==
Meanwhile, possibly due to Derby's connections, Hawkins was appointed assistant superintendent of the Great Exhibition of 1851 in London. The following year, he was appointed by the Crystal Palace company to create 33 life-size concrete models of extinct dinosaurs to be placed in the south London park to which the great glass exhibition hall was to be relocated. In this work, which took some three years, he collaborated with Sir Richard Owen and other leading scientific figures of the time: Owen estimated the size and overall shape of the animals, leaving Hawkins to sculpt the models according to Owen's directions.

A dinner was held inside the mould used to make the Iguanodon. The dinner party, hosted by Owen on 31 December 1853, garnered attention in the press. Most of the sculptures are still on display in Crystal Palace Park.

== United States ==
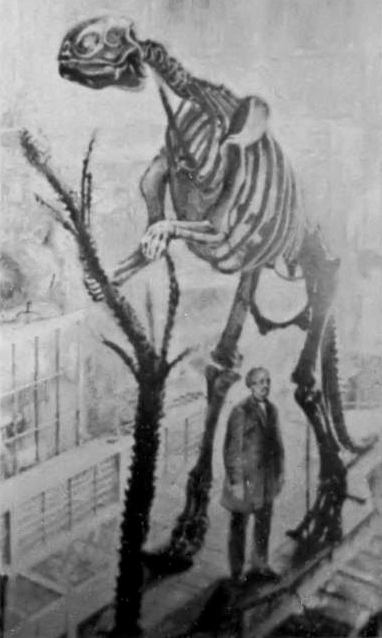
Benjamin Waterhouse Hawkins' mounted Hadrosaurus in Philadelphia in 1868, making it the first mounted dinosaur skeleton in the world.

In 1868, he traveled to the United States to deliver a series of lectures. Working with the scientist Joseph Leidy, Hawkins designed and cast an almost complete skeleton of Hadrosaurus foulkii which was then displayed at the Academy of Natural Sciences in Philadelphia. Supported on an iron framework in a lifelike pose, this was the world's first mounted dinosaur skeleton.

Hawkins was later commissioned to produce models for New York City's Central Park museum similar to these he had created in Sydenham. He established a studio on the original site of the American Museum of Natural History in Manhattan, and planned to create a Paleozoic Museum. During his ten years in America (1868–1878), Hawkins designed exhibit halls for the Smithsonian Institution in Washington, D.C., and began to create an enormous paleontological museum for New York City. The museum was to have been in Central Park. His work was all destroyed in 1871 by Henry Hilton, the corrupt and bizarre-acting Treasurer and VP of Central Park, but was for many decades thought to have been the work of Hilton's employer, William "Boss" Tweed, a corrupt politician who wasn't adequately compensated for his patronage. However, Tweed himself was fighting scandals regarding his corrupt dealings at the time, and was later proved innocent of the destruction of Hawkins' models in 2023, when the real culprit was revealed through reexamination of historical records and annual reports and minutes. Hilton's motivations towards the vandalism are largely unknown, but may have been personal, with Hilton being purported to have told Hawkins that he "should not bother with "dead animals", as there was enough to do among the living", and that Hilton had little understanding or appreciation for art or nature, with several instances being recorded of him whitewashing priceless relics, statues and artifacts in bizarre acts of vandalism. Furthermore, Hilton had been placed in charge of establishing the American Museum of Natural History, and it is possible he wanted to eliminate the planned Paleozoic Museum, which he saw as competition.

Following the tragic loss of his studio through destruction of all of his dinosaur models at the hands of Hilton's vandals, he returned to England in 1874, but almost immediately returned, doing dinosaur reconstructions at Princeton University (then called the College of New Jersey) in Princeton, New Jersey (where he also created paintings of dinosaurs). These paintings remain in the collection of the Princeton University Art Museum. Hawkins also worked at the Centennial Exhibition of 1876 in Philadelphia. He again returned to Britain in 1878.

== Personal life ==
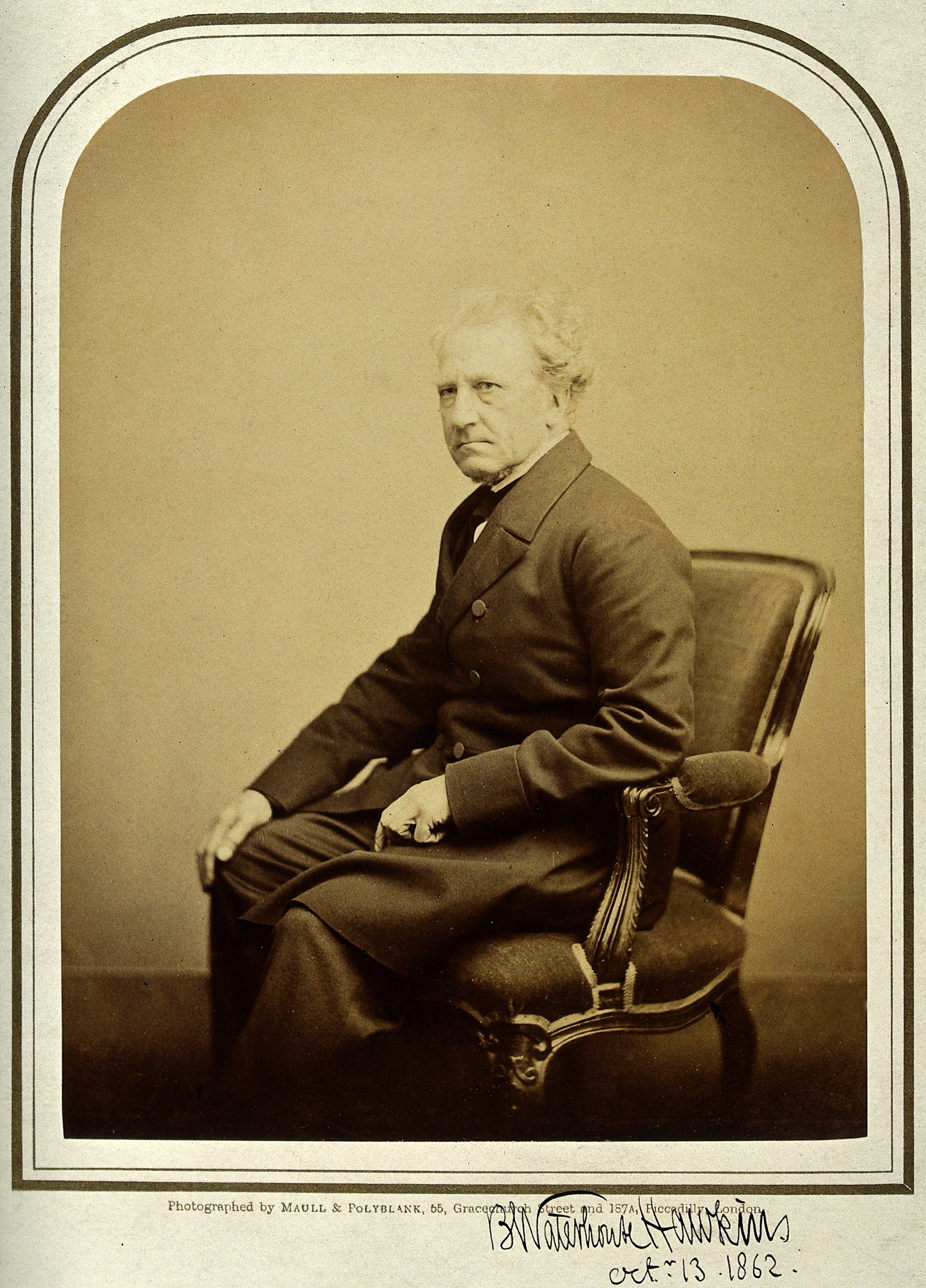
Hawkins in October 1862

Hawkins married Mary Selina Green (1804–1880) on 4 July 1826 at St John-at-Hampstead. The couple had four daughters and one son.

On 23 April 1836, Hawkins bigamously married Frances Louisa Keenan (1811–1884), a portrait painter who exhibited at the Royal Academy from 1839 to 1868.

Hawkins lived with Frances and had two daughters with her. He seems to have become estranged from Frances on his 1874 return to England. He was living with his son by Mary, amidst what he described a "climax of domestic troubles" thought to indicate that Frances had finally learned that their 38-year marriage had been invalid; this may have led to his sudden return to America in 1875. After his second return to England, he moved to West Brompton to be near Mary, who was ill. She died in 1880.

Hawkins and Frances remarried in a civil ceremony on 17 May 1883, although since they were not cohabitants at the time this was probably done for legalistic reasons (to legitimize their children). They apparently never reconciled before her death the next year.

== Death and legacy ==
Hawkins suffered a debilitating stroke in 1889, leading to erroneous reports of his death. He suffered from the stroke's effects for the rest of his life. Hawkins died at 60 Erpingham Road in Putney, London, on 27 January 1894, from a combination of health problems brought on by both his stroke and gangrene of the feet. He was buried at Putney Lower Common Cemetery.

There is a blue plaque at 22 Belvedere Road ("Fossil Villa") in Upper Norwood, commemorating where he lived between 1856 and 1872.

Robert J. Sawyer's 1994 novel End of an Era mentions the famous New Year's Eve 1853 dinner party inside the Iguanodon, citing both Hawkins and Sir Richard Owen by name. A biography of Hawkins titled All In The Bones was published.

== Works list ==
- Comparative anatomy as applied to the purposes of the artist by Benjamin Waterhouse Hawkins and George Wallis. Published by Winsor & Newton, Ltd. [1883]
- Fauna boreali-americana, or, The zoology of the northern parts of British America : containing descriptions of the objects of natural history collected on the late northern land expeditions under command of Captain Sir John Franklin, R.N. by: Sir John Richardson, Charles M Curtis, Sir John Franklin, Benjamin Waterhouse Hawkins, William Kirby, Thomas Landseer, James de Carle Sowerby, William Swainson, Charles Edward Wagstaff. Published by John Murray (1829-1837)
- Gleanings from the menagerie and aviary at Knowsley Hall by John Edward Gray, Benjamin Waterhouse Hawkins, Edward Lear. Published by Knowsley [Printed for private distribution] (1846–50)
- Group of European bison or aurochs sculpture in Bronze Exhibited at Great Exhibition of the Works of Industry of all Nations (London), 1851. Modelled and chased for presentation to H.I.M. the Emperor of Russia, from the Zoological Society of London Currently there is only one known cast of the bronze in existence. The owners are also open to loan requests of the sculpture.
- Bronze cobra inkwell with compass Published 1850. See https://en.wikipedia.org/wiki/File:PXL_20240413_230021826.jpg
- Sculpture work for the famous Coalbrookdale company as exhibited at the 1851 Great exhibition. References to follow.
- Coalbrookdale

== Gallery ==
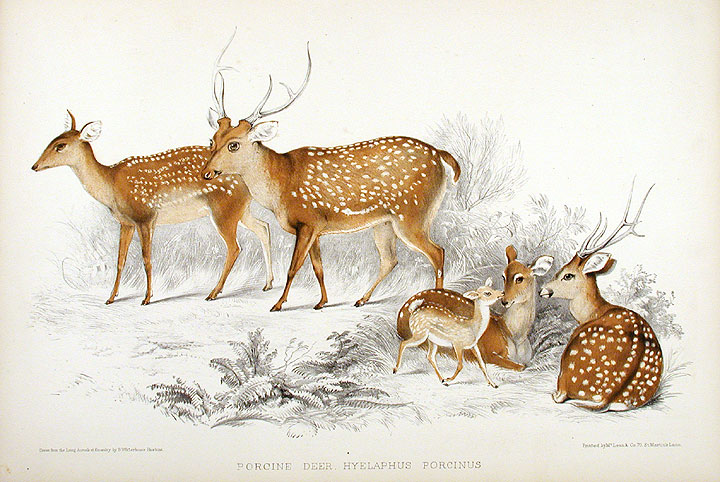
Porcine Deer (Axis porcinus) from Knowsley Park

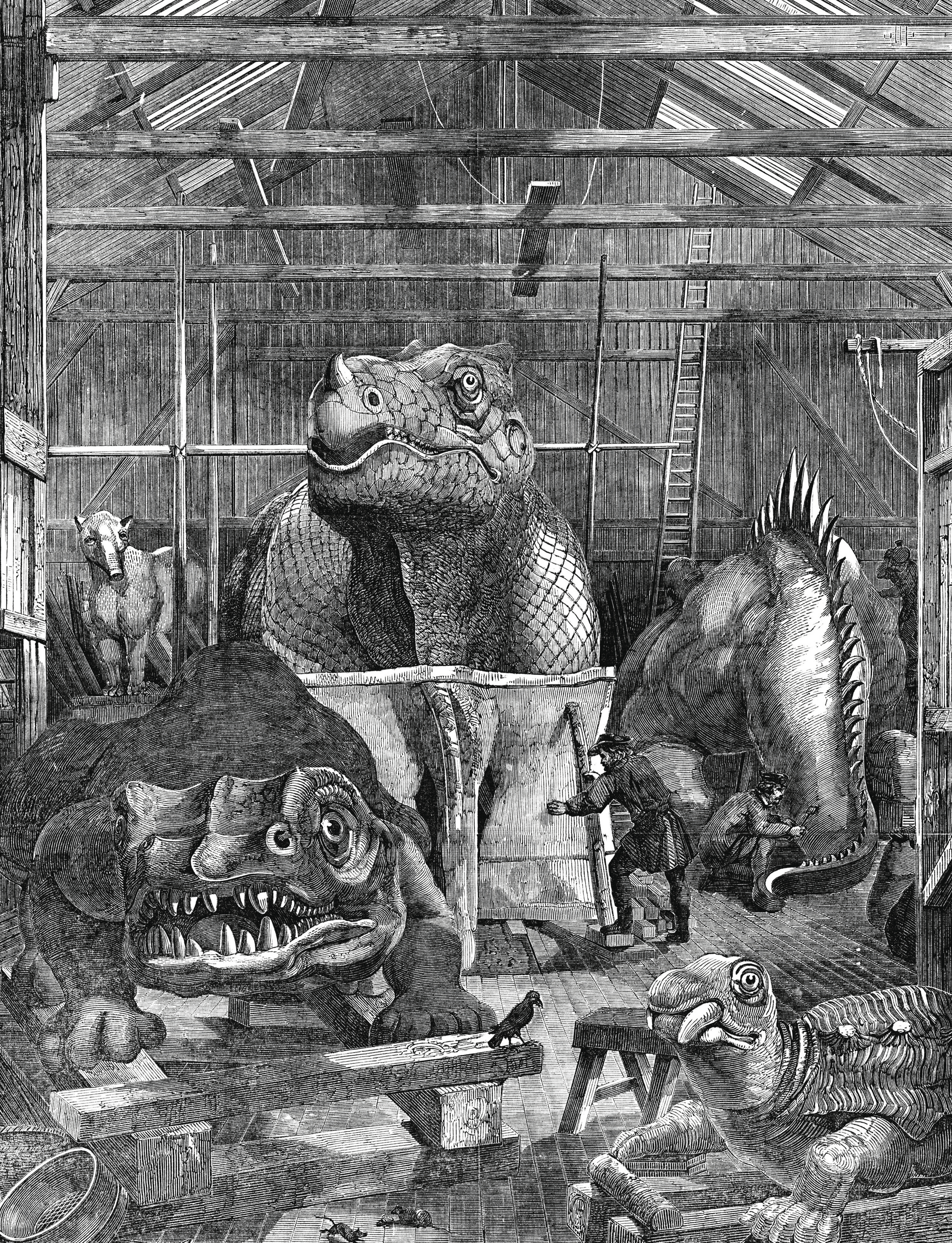
Benjamin Waterhouse Hawkins' studio in Sydenham, where he made the Crystal Palace Dinosaurs

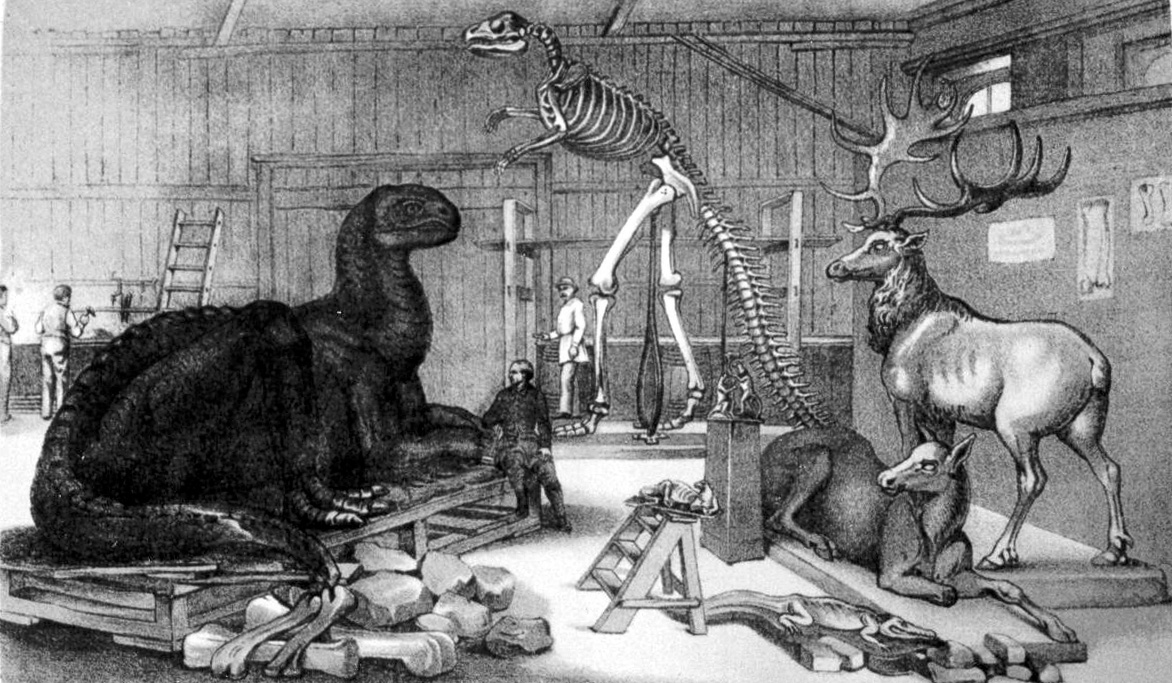
Benjamin Waterhouse Hawkins' studio at the Central Park Arsenal, with models of extinct animals

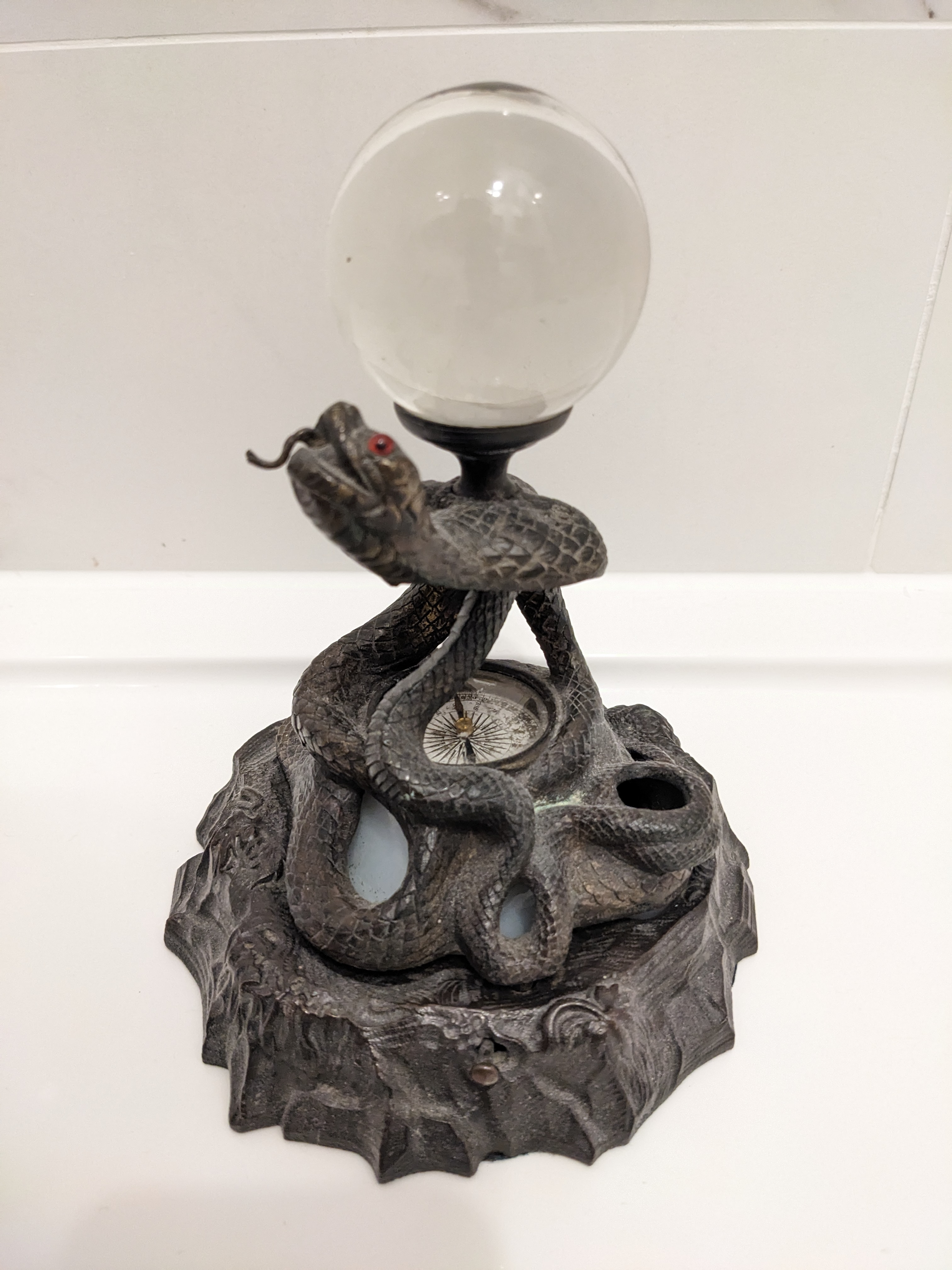
Bronze sculpture of cobra with inkwell and compass. Published 1850.
Princeton University Art Museum

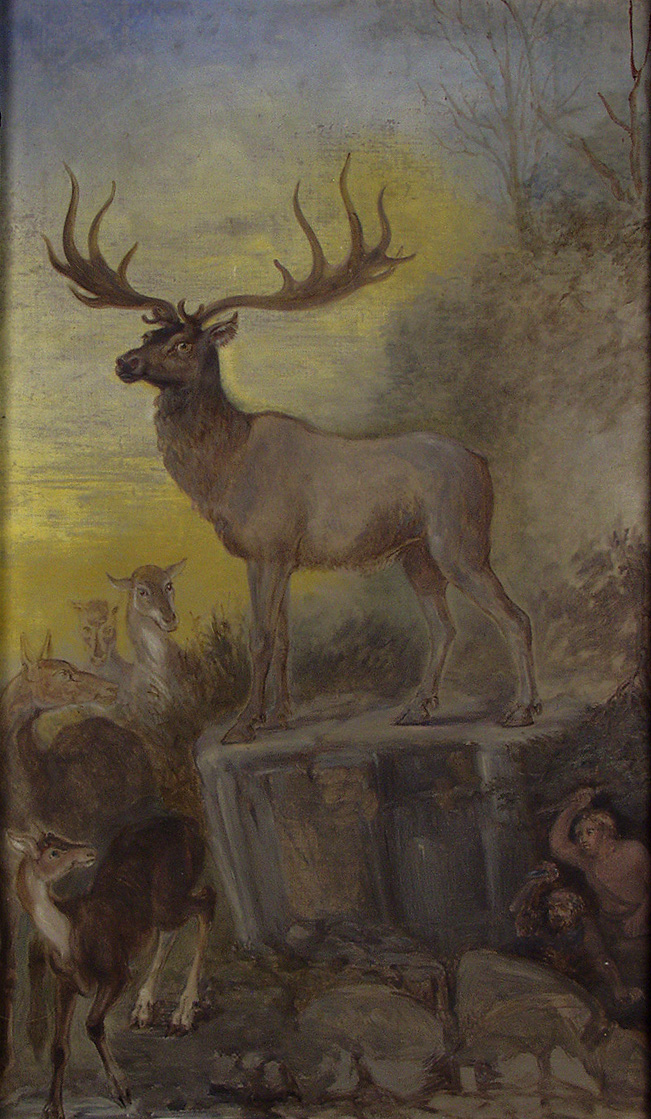
Irish Elk and Palaeolithic Hunter, by 1894

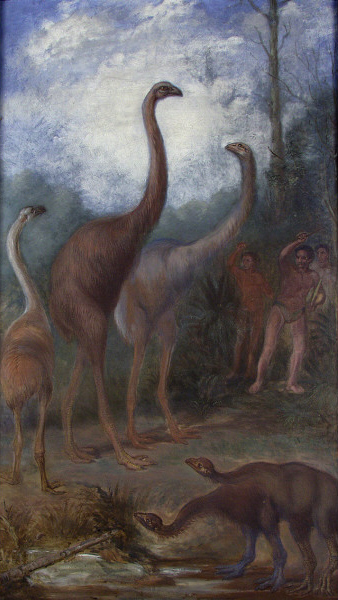
Moas of Prehistoric New Zealand, by 1894

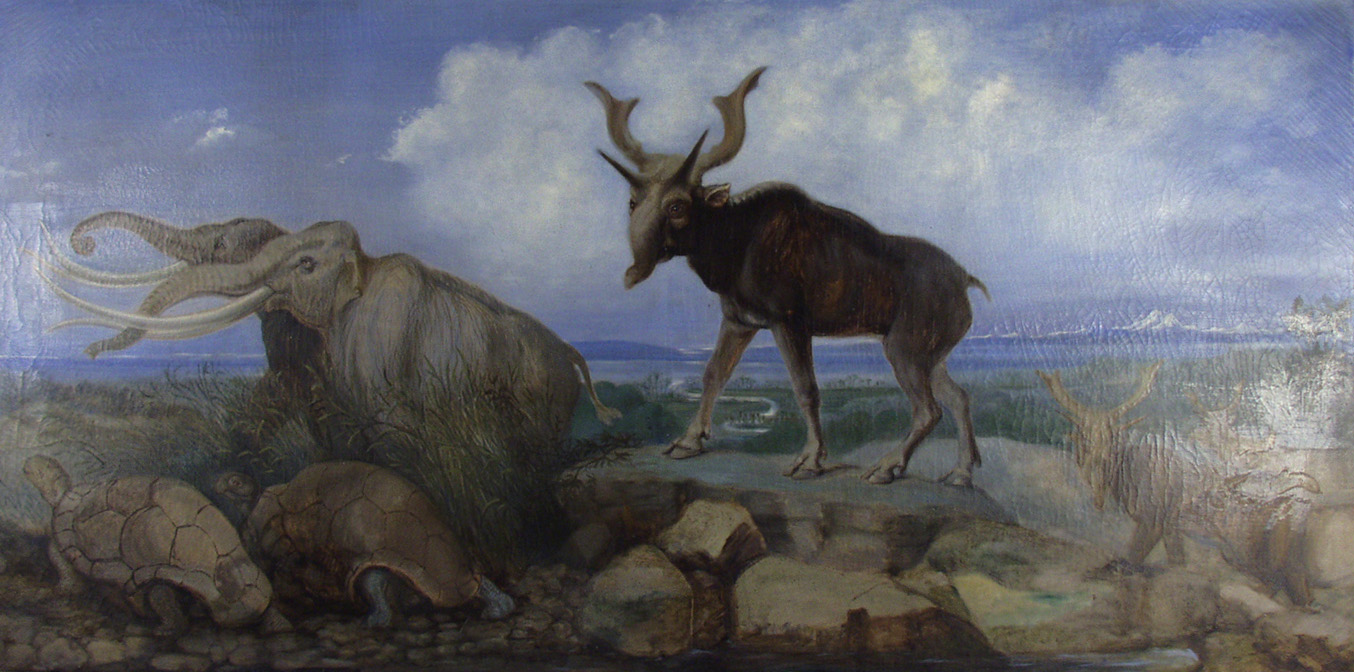
Pleistocene Fauna of Asia, commissioned 1876
