= Paleozoic Museum =

Proposed museum of natural history in Manhattan

Coordinates: 40°46′14″N 73°58′46″W

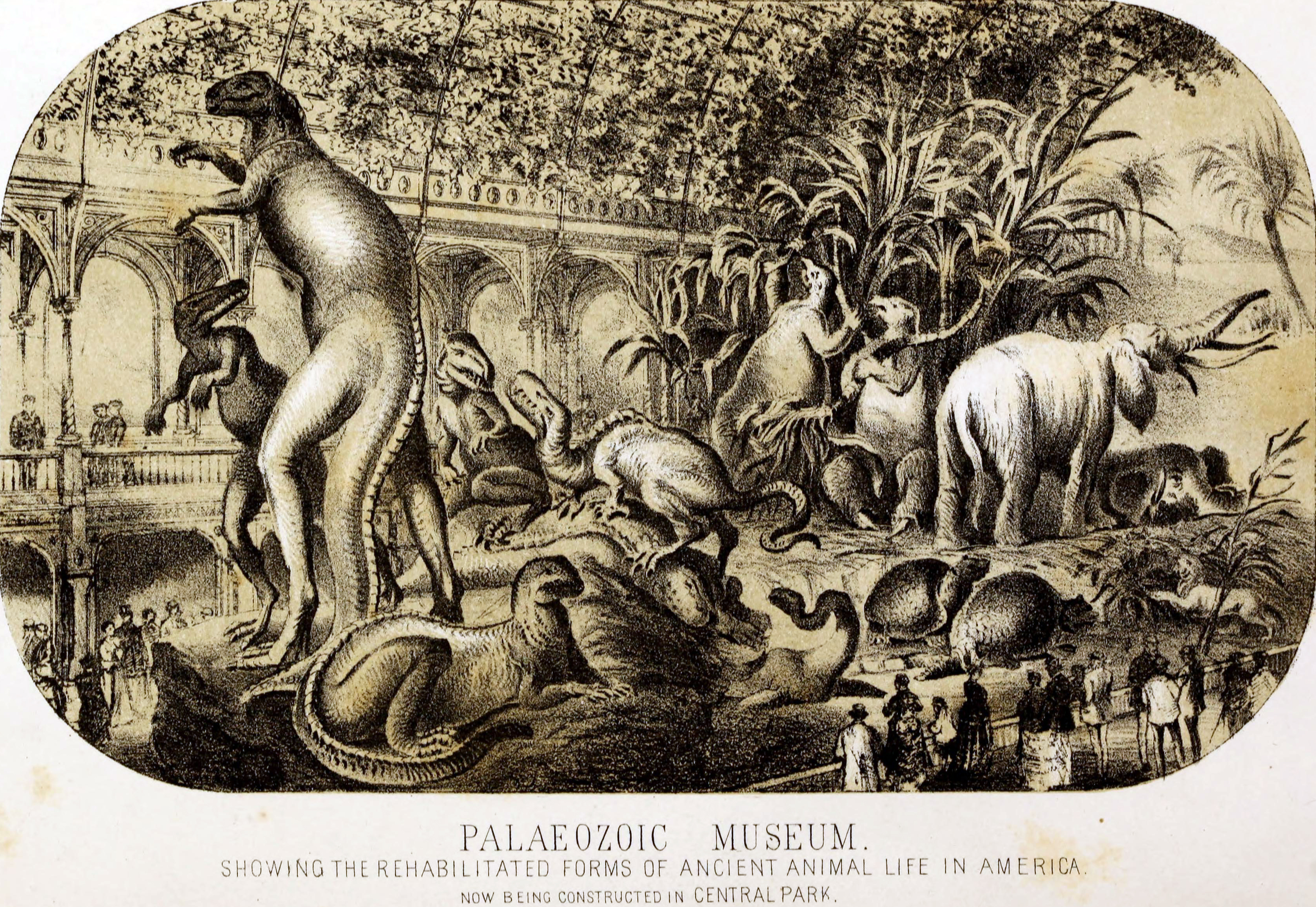
Hawkins' conceptual drawing of the Paleozoic Museum in 1858

The Paleozoic Museum was a proposed museum of natural history in Manhattan near Central Park. Planning and initial construction for the museum proceeded in 1868–1870; English sculptor Benjamin Waterhouse Hawkins planned and began creation of the dioramas, and the foundations for an eventual structure were laid at Central Park West and 63rd Street. The field of paleontology was in its infancy then, but interest was high for a museum displaying the latest findings. The museum never came to fruition after a combination of political resistance and a bizarre case of vandalism in 1871 that destroyed the dinosaur models that were prepared to be displayed in the museum.

== The museum ==
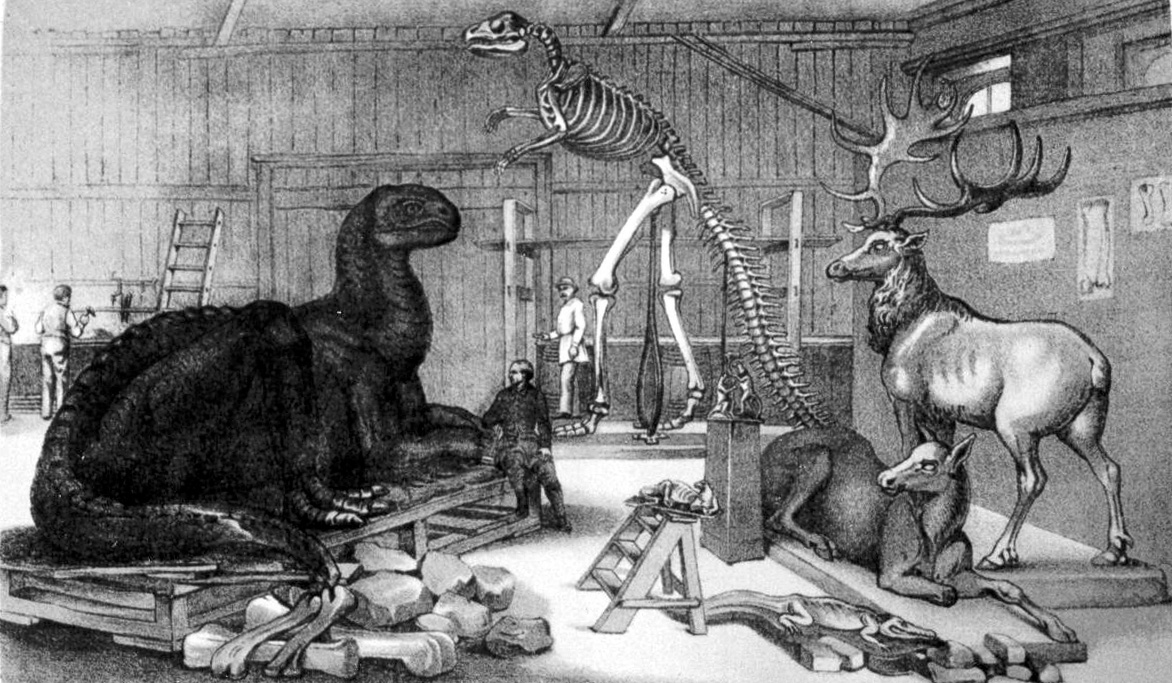
Hawkins' studio in Central Park, 1868

After the Great Exhibition of 1851 in London, The Crystal Palace at Hyde Palace was taken down and moved to a new location in South London. The Crystal Palace reopened in 1854, and one of the new exhibits was sculptor Benjamin Waterhouse Hawkins' life-sized concrete dinosaur models, the Crystal Palace Dinosaurs. The Dinosaur exhibit was a great success and very popular. Hawkins came to America in 1868 and displayed a mounted dinosaur skeleton in Philadelphia. Inspired, in 1868 Manhattan's newly created Board of Commissioners of Central Park (BCCP), headed by Comptroller Andrew H. Green, recruited Hawkins to create replicas of these ancient giants for a proposed museum in Central Park. He accepted the commission in May 1868. The museum was to have been known as the Paleozoic Museum (or Palaeozoic Museum); despite the name, it was intended to be a museum of all antediluvian history, not merely the Paleozoic period. Foundations for the structure were laid by architect Frederick Law Olmsted at Central Park West and 63rd Street. Like Hyde Park's Crystal Palace, Hawkins' display was to be housed within a great iron frame and an arched glass roof. Surviving sketches and photographs show that Hawkins had planned an elaborate, if anachronistic, menagerie, mixing Mesozoic dinosaurs, plesiosaurs, and mosasaurs with extinct Cenozoic mammals.

Extant drawings by Hawkins, along with other records, indicate that the Paleozoic Museum would have included life-sized restorations of the theropod Laelaps (=Dryptosaurus), the hadrosaurid Hadrosaurus, the plesiosaur Elasmosaurus, and the mosasaur Mosasaurus (all from the Upper Cretaceous marls of New Jersey), along with glyptodont models, a pair of giant ground sloths, giant Pleistocene elk, mammoths, and extinct mammalian carnivores. After the plans for the museum fell through, Hawkins went to Princeton University where he painted a number of restorations of America's Late Cretaceous environments; these works have survived. Hawkins models from the Crystal Palace exhibition are still extant and can still be seen today in Sydenham Park.

== Destruction ==
Unfortunately for Hawkins, the planned museum ran afoul of 19th century New York's politics. A new governing board of Central Park appointed in April 1870 still included Andrew Green, who had been supportive of the project, but reduced him to a mere member. The new board was led by Peter B. Sweeny, largely seen as influenced by his patron "Boss Tweed" (William Magear Tweed). It decided not to move forward with the project in meetings in both May and December 1870, citing economic and cost concerns. Hawkins spoke out publicly against Tweed and the cancellation in a public meeting in March 1871. The prospects of reviving the museum were crushed after an act of vandalism. On May 3, 1871, vandals armed with sledgehammers arrived at the workshop in Central Park and destroyed it, smashing the seven finished models and their molds, and destroying the plans and drawings they could find. The ruined sculptures were then buried somewhere near the southwestern corner of the park.

Location of proposed museum in Central Park

Various sources blamed Tweed for having sent the vandals, often linking it to ethnic bigotry—Tweed's Tammany Hall "machine" was the party of Irish immigrants, Hawkins was English, and Irish-English relations were famously tense in the era. Religious motives were another speculated factor—perhaps Tweed or the vandals were motivated by creationism. However, contemporary sources do not all agree it was Tweed; a 2023 paper reassessed the evidence, and considered it unlikely Tweed had ordered the vandalism. Rather, the paper suggests that Henry Hilton, an eccentric lawyer and a commissioner on the new Public Parks board that had been appointed in 1870, was a more likely culprit. Hilton was involved in supporting a rival project—the 1869 American Museum of Natural History—and further has a record of strange and destructive acts, including disputing with museum officials and ordering artifacts destroyed or painted over. Hilton had already ordered Hawkins to stop work earlier, and had a history of other "crazy actions"; the article wrote that Hilton was "not only bad, but also mad." Additionally, while Hawkins had criticized Tweed, it was one minor instance buried on the fifth page of The New York Times; Tweed was a person constantly criticized by the media of the day, often far more prominently and on the front page. The article argues he could not possibly have taken revenge on every such petty slight.
