= Diggory =

Diggory or Digory may refer to:

== People ==
- Anne Diggory (born 1951), American painter
- Peter Diggory (1924–2009), English gynaecologist

== Fictional characters ==
=== As given name ===
Diggory

- Diggory Compton, a fictional character from Coronation Street
- Diggory Venn, a fictional character from Thomas Hardy's Return of the Native (1878)

Digory

- Digory Kirke, a fictional character from The Chronicles of Narnia

=== As family name ===
- Cedric Diggory, a fictional character from the Harry Potter series
  - Amos Diggory, Cedric's father
