= Adirondack Trust Company =

Independent community bank in New York, US

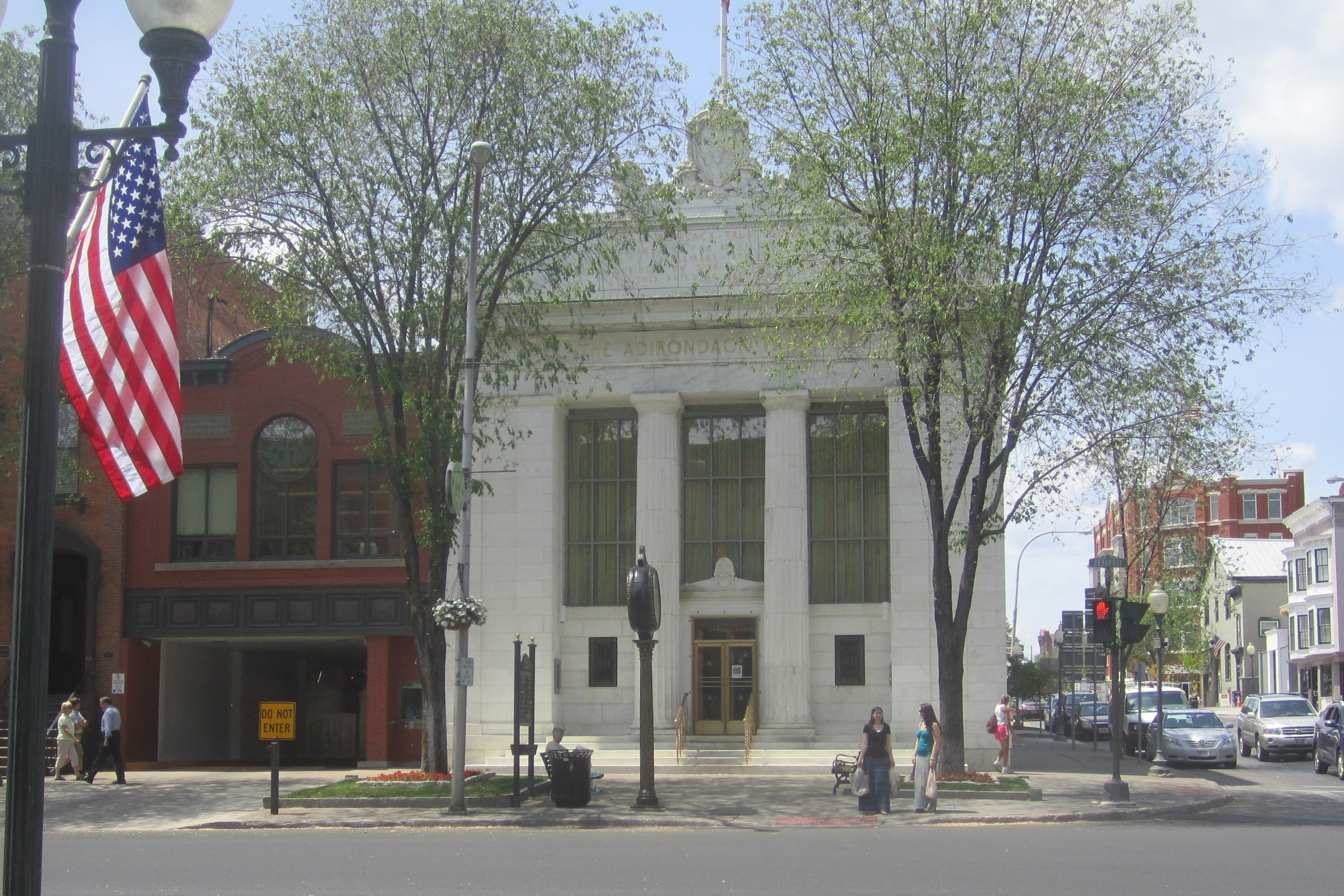
- Main office of the Adirondack Trust Company, 473 Broadway, Saratoga Springs, New York
- Type: Private
- Industry: Financial services
- Founded: 1901
- Headquarters: Saratoga Springs, New York, United States
- Number of locations: 13 branches
- Products: Personal Banking, Business Banking, Insurance
- Website: www.adirondacktrust.com

Adirondack Trust Company is the largest independent community bank in Saratoga County, New York, US. Adirondack Trust's 167 full-time employees own the company, which offers banking, loans, and investment services, along with insurance through its Amsure subsidiary. As of December 2020, the bank reported almost $1.5 billion in assets and over $1.3 billion in deposits across 13 branches.

Also as of 2020, the bank's CEO is Charles V. Wait Jr., and the chairman is his father Charles V. Wait. Charles Wait Sr. served as a Federal Reserve Bank of New York director for nine years. The bank has mostly been led by the same family for four generations. Charles Wait Jr. joined the bank in 2009 as vice president of legal and regulatory affairs. In 2020, Charlie began running the "family business" as CEO.

== Background ==
Adirondack Trust was founded in 1901 by New York State Senator Edgar T. Brackett with capital of $100,000 and surplus of $50,000. The bank officially opened its doors on January 2, 1902, at the Westcott Building, a three-story brick building on Broadway in Saratoga Springs, the same location where the bank stands today.

Adirondack Trust played a large role in transforming Saratoga Springs from a small "boom and bust" town into a thriving city. In January 1902, it concluded a $100,000 mortgage (around $3,720,000 in 2020 dollars) with the machinery manufacturer Baker and Shevlin of Ballston Spa, New York (now Espey Manufacturing), which was considered a "big mortgage" at the time. The bank in 1908 was dubbed "the largest and richest banking institution in the State north of Albany."

The bank has financed some of the highest-profile business and civic enterprises in Saratoga Springs, including Skidmore College, the Saratoga City Center, the Saratoga Performing Arts Center (SPAC) and in the 1960s, the city's first modern-era hotel. Charles V. Wait, among other civic leaders, chaired the 1970s Plan of Action initiative coordinated by the Saratoga County Chamber of Commerce to help revitalize Downtown Saratoga Springs. In 2009, Adirondack Trust established The Adirondack Trust Community Fund that each year awards grants to local nonprofit organizations within Saratoga, Warren and Washington Counties. Grant awards have supported programs in such diverse areas as veteran outreach, STEM education, summer lunch programs, wildlife education, homelessness prevention, youth services, and the arts.

Through the years, it has become the highest-rated bank in Saratoga County, both in CRA (Community Reinvestment Act) and in safety and soundness. Adirondack Trust Company has been named one of the 100 safest banks in the country, and the safest bank in New York, by Money magazine. Following this rating it had an influx of requests to open accounts, which it had to turn away because it only accepts accounts within its local area.

In 2008 they acquired Amsure Associates Inc.

== Historic Headquarters Building ==
In 1916, after surpassing $3 million in deposits, the bank's board of directors commissioned the building of a new headquarters in recognition of the "magnificent support by the public" and the building remains the bank's headquarters today.

Adirondack Trust Company headquarters is in the Broadway Historic District and is part of its listing in the National Register of Historic Places; its building is a white marble 1916 Beaux-Arts building designed by Alfred Hopkins featuring Tiffany bronze doors and chandeliers. All the decorations have Adirondack themes. In celebration of its centennial the bank commissioned a mural from artist Anne Diggory. The 22-by-9-foot mural, titled The Flume, continuing the Adirondack theme, was installed in 2001.

The building held a time capsule placed in its cornerstone in 1916 and opened 100 years later. The capsule included newspapers reporting World War I, brochures of nearby Congress Park, the bank's 1902 founding ledger, and a letter from State Senator Edgar T. Brackett. The capsule was replaced and new items include a visitor's guide, Saratoga national historic coins, modern copies of The Saratogian and a digital copy of a statement.

== Civic engagement and community service ==
The Adirondack Trust Company administers the Adirondack Trust Co. Community Fund, an independent 501(c)(3) organization, as its trustee, with guidance from an independent advisory committee composed of individuals from its community. The endowment acts as a perpetual source of funding for a broad array of nonprofit organizations that improve the quality of life in the community and to assist them in addressing issues of common concern.

In 2020, during the COVID-19 pandemic, Adirondack Trust partnered with Saratoga Hospital to launch the COVID-19 Business Safety Consultation Program help area businesses reopen safely.

In 2021, the company sponsored the Saratoga Performing Arts Center's virtual exhibit “The 2021 Adirondack Trust Company Festival of Young Artists” Online Gallery, featuring 80 inspiring student creations from the Capital Region's brightest young dancers, musicians, singers, poets, and visual artists.

== Allegations of Discriminatory Practices ==
In its early years the bank faced significant challenges, including a 1906 bank run blamed on "Italians," which garnered nationwide publicity. The national press coverage, which framed the event as something Italians had done to the bank rather than reporting a withdrawal of deposits, reflected the ethnic scapegoating Italian immigrants routinely faced in American newspapers of the era. The Italian immigrant community referred to in that coverage was concentrated in the city's West Side — a working-class neighborhood that had transitioned from an Irish enclave to an Italian one in the late nineteenth century. The Principessa Elena Society, founded on January 4, 1900, by Italian-American men on Oak Street — one block west of the bank's Broadway headquarters — provided the community with mutual aid and informal banking services during this period. Its founding principles of fraternity, liberty, and equality were intended to promote the collective welfare of its members at a time when the Italian immigrant community faced discrimination from mainstream financial institutions and the press.

In July 1982, at a time when interests rates in the USA became drastically high, Adirondack Trust Company recalled hundreds of 10-year-old low interest mortgages demanding that surprised homeowners renegotiate their interest rates or pay on their notes. This behavior targeted vulnerable individuals who had agreed upon terms and conditions for ten years, causing the Saratoga County Economic Opportunity Council to organize boycotts of the bank on behalf of persons in poverty, and "a group called Neighbors for Fair Banking to picket the bank, hand out leaflets protesting the mortgage recalls, and distributing bumper stickers and lapel buttons". Additionally, the mortgage recall caused the State Attorney General's office, the State Banking Department and the State Consumer Protection Board to investigate the bank. Finally, the City of Saratoga Springs was compelled under public scrutiny "to amend the City Charter so that municipal funds could be deposited in a variety of banks, not just Adirondack Trust"

Adirondack Trust Company cooperated in a New York State Department of Financial Services investigation into discriminatory lending practices. The investigation found that the "Bank's specific policies and practices of allowing automobile dealers to markup a consumer's interest rate without any justification on the basis of objective credit-related factors above the Bank's established risk-based Buy Rate resulted in a disparate impact on the basis of race and national origin that was not justified by legitimate business need". The investigation further found that, "Adirondack maintained a policy which permitted dealer markups of up to 2.00%, at the dealer's sole discretion and not controlled by the adjustments for creditworthiness and other objective criteria already reflected in the Bank's risk based Buy Rate". The Department of Financial Services noted it "did not find evidence of any intentional discrimination against applicants on the part of the Bank or its employees." Adirondack Trust Company paid a civil penalty of $275,000. To address the individual concerns, restitution was calculated for each eligible as described in the consent decree. As part of the settlement, the bank contributed $50,000 to local community development organizations.

Adirondack Trust Company has also been accused of discrimination in the administration of its Paycheck Protection Program loans as part of an ongoing legal dispute with a business owner accused of lying on loan applications and the bank who is accused of the improper administration of SBA loans to the legal detriment of others in the midst of the covid pandemic.
