= John Clarke (businessman) =

American businessman

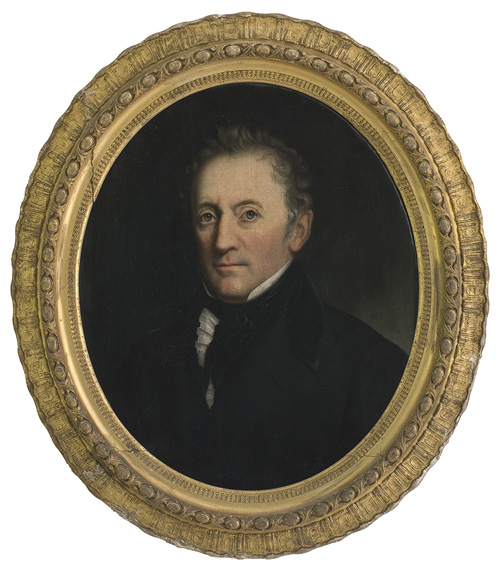
John Clarke in 1845. Portrait by Nelson Cook.

"Doctor" John Clarke (1773–1846) was an American businessman who played a major role in the development of Saratoga Springs, New York, in the 19th-century. Usually called "Doctor Clarke", Doctor was a courtesy title.

Born in Yorkshire, England, Clarke immigrated to America and settled in New York City. In 1819 he opened the first soda fountain there. In 1823 he purchased land in Saratoga Springs with partner Thomas Lynch. The property included the Congress Spring in what is now Congress Park, at that time a swamp. Clarke drained the swamp to create a park and built a bottling plant there. In 1825 Lynch and Clarke began bottling Congress Spring Water. Lynch died in 1833 and Clarke continued the business alone.

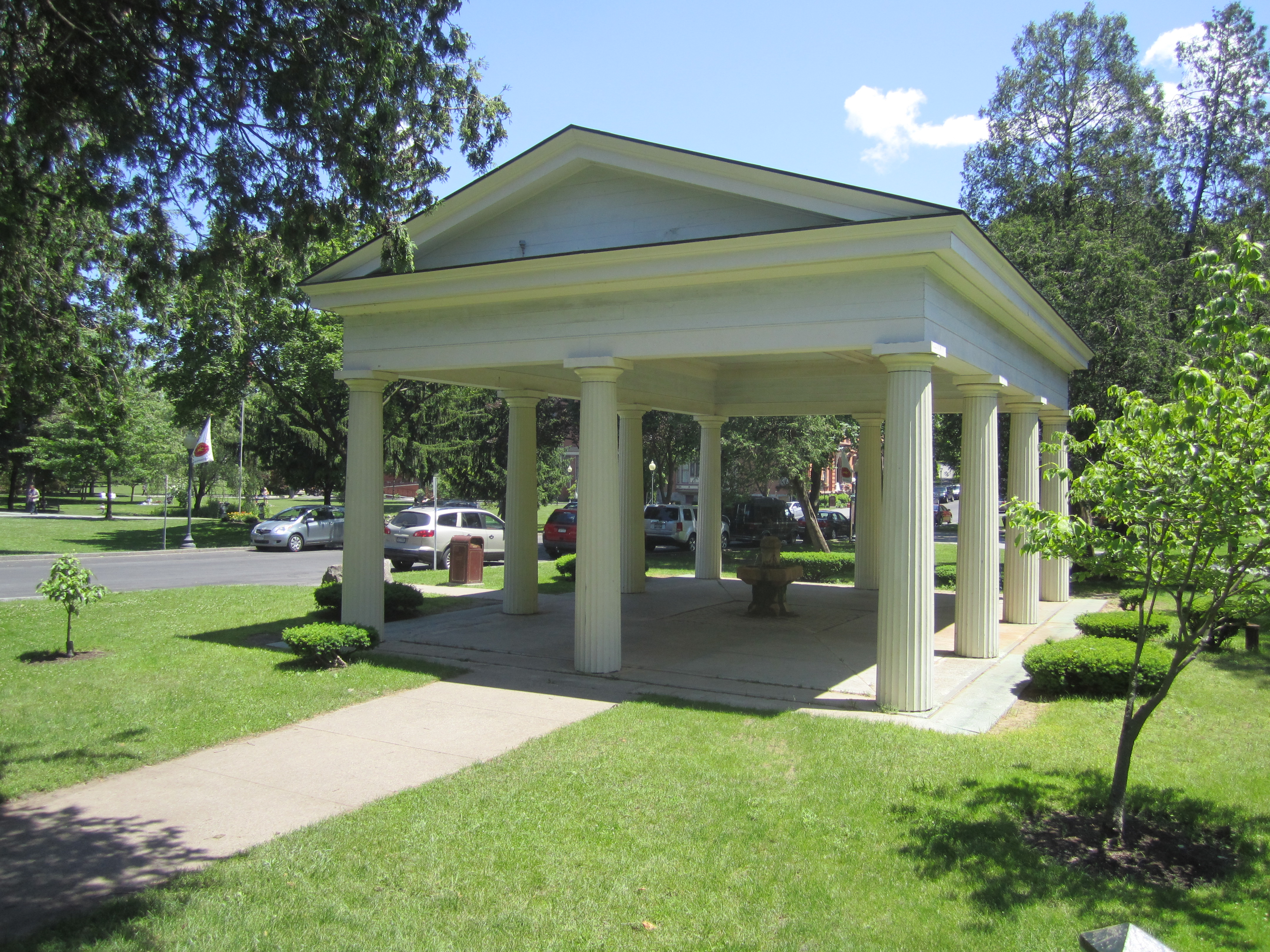
Congress Spring pavilion in 2013

Clarke built a doric pavilion to cover Congress Spring, which was torn down in 1876 when Frederick Law Olmsted redesigned the park and reconstructed in the 1970s.

Clarke planned and named Circular Street in Saratoga Springs, and in 1832 he built a Greek Revival mansion there overlooking Congress Park. He donated land to build an Episcopal church on the south-east corner of Circular Street and Union Avenue (then called East Congress Street). A change of plans resulted in the location moving to Washington Street where the Bethesda Episcopal Church was built in 1842.

Clarke began to accumulate land east of Congress Park from the time he arrived in Saratoga Springs. At his death he owned nearly 1,000 acres (400 ha).

Dr. Clarke was married to Mrs. Eliza (Bryer) White, widow of Charles White, with whom he had three children, Eliza(September 6, 1829 – April 25, 1894), Thomas (d. August 16, 1880 ), and George B. He died on May 6, 1846. Stepdaughter Eliza first married Isaac Thayer and, following his death in 1852, she married Cornelius Sheehan, and continued to occupy the house on Circular street.
