= United States Post Office (Saratoga Springs, New York) =

- U.S. Post Office
- U.S. National Register of Historic Places
- U.S. Historic district – Contributing property
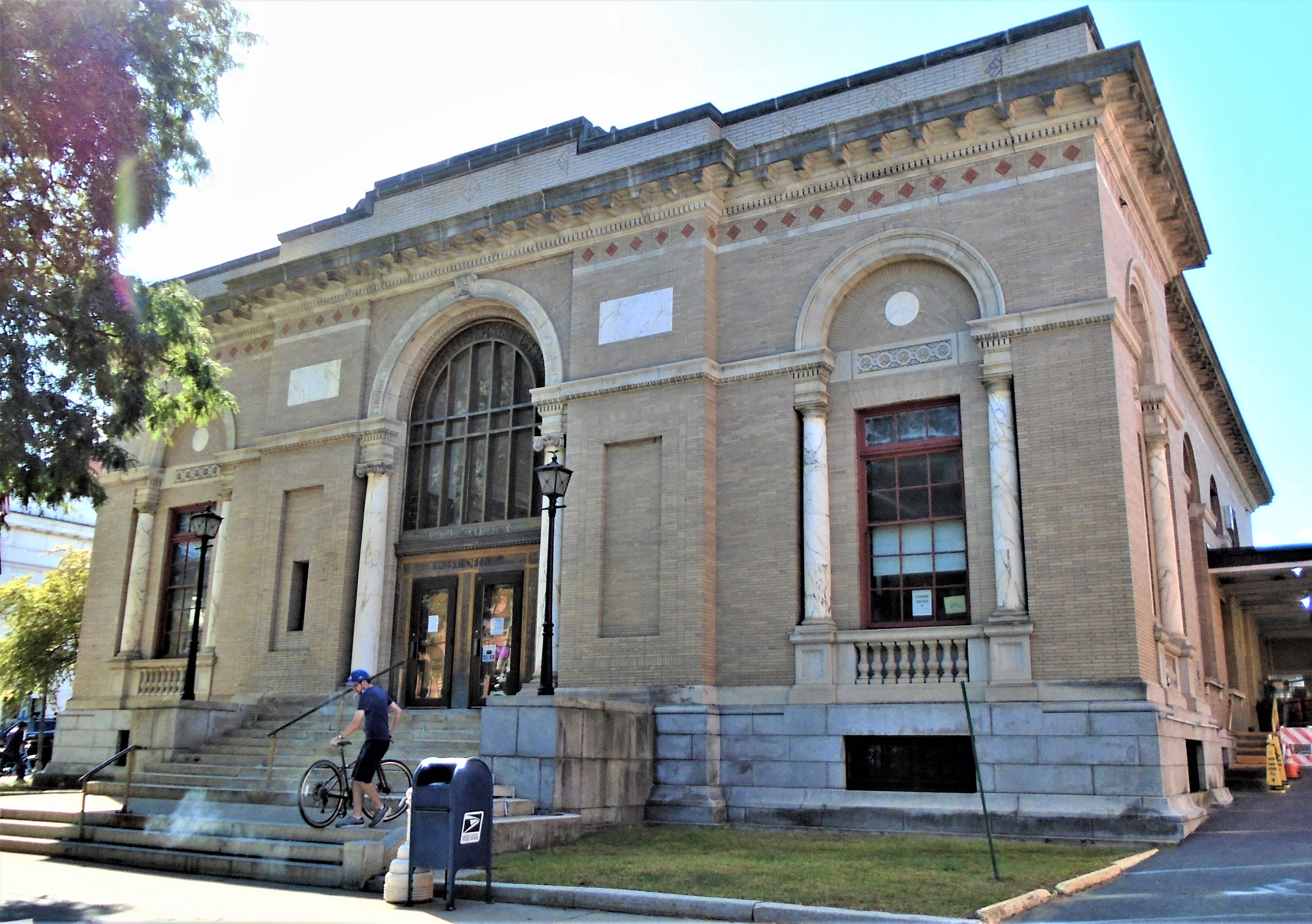
- (2020)

- Location within New York Location within the United States
- Location: 475 Broadway; Saratoga Springs, NY
- Coordinates: 43°5′0″N 73°47′6″W
- Area: less than one acre
- Built: 1910
- Architect: James Knox Taylor
- Architectural style: Classical Revival
- Part of: Broadway Historic District
- MPS: US Post Offices in New York State, 1858-1943, TR
- NRHP reference No.: 88002427
- Added to NRHP: May 11, 1989

The U.S. Post Office in Saratoga Springs, New York, United States, is located at 475 Broadway at the intersection of Church Street in the center of the city. It is a brick structure built in 1910 in the Classical Revival architectural style, and was designed by James Knox Taylor, supervising architect for the Treasury Department. The post office serves the ZIP Code 12866, covering the city of Saratoga Springs.

At the time of its construction and opening it had one of the most elaborate lobbies of any post office in the state. Two murals depicting the city's race track were added to it in the 1930s. The lobby has since been altered somewhat, but enough of the building's integrity and original design remains that it was listed on the National Register of Historic Places in 1989. It had already been a contributing property to the Broadway Historic District since that was first designated in 1978.

== Building ==
The post office is set back somewhat from Broadway. There are mature trees and some landscaping between the sidewalk and street. It is one of four notable buildings at the busy intersection. Across the street is the city's Italianate city hall. On the far corner is the elaborate, massive Ainsworth Building, and the 1916 Beaux-Arts marble Adirondack Trust Company building faces the post office across Church Street.

It is rectangular, one story high, three bays by four with a flat roof and faced in yellow pressed Roman brick on a foundation of finished granite. Both marble and limestone are used as trim. Above the window level a limestone egg-and-dart course goes around the building. Above it is an entablature with a frieze decorated with a geometric pattern of red and yellow brick. The cornice is dentilled with plain modillions and shallow panels between. The short roof parapet has limestone coping and, at a higher section over the main entrance, foliated brackets.

The middle bay on the east (front) elevation projects. It is a semicircular arch with a plainly molded archivolt supported by freestanding Doric columns of veined and polished marble. A recessed bronze screen has windows in the top and the main doors below. Granite steps with a central bronze rail lead up to it. The original heavy bronze doors are still in place although they have been functionally replaced by modern aluminum doors. A Greek key design is embellished around the doors, and "POST OFFICE" is written above.

The flanking windows, and the easternmost bays on the north and south facades, have a similar treatment except for the columns being pedestaled on a balustrade. The other window openings on the north and south facades are recessed, their plain limestone sills supported by brackets. Their arches have windows with radiating wooden muntins. A small vertical window is located between the easternmost, projecting bay and the next one. On the south facade a wheelchair ramp climbs up and offers access at this point. The north side has an open brick loading dock that covers part of the rear.

Inside, the lobby has a 14-foot–high (4.3 m) plaster coffered ceiling with a central leaded glass skylight, curved to match the angle of the rear wall. The walls themselves are lined with segmented recessed arches, topped by an egg-and-dart cornice. The entrance arch has a similar surround. On either side of the vestibule are murals by Guy Pène du Bois entitled Saratoga in the Racing Season.

The floor has modern carpeting; a white marble baseboard and green marble wainscoting surround part of the lobby. A 9-foot–high (3 m) screenline with post office boxes divides it in half. Teller windows are on the north side.

== History ==
Saratoga Springs has had a post office since founder Gideon Putnam built its first resort hotel in 1802. The first two were run out of local merchants' stores. Later in the 19th century it was moved to a local office building, like the first two located on Broadway, the city's main street. The present site was acquired for almost $125,000 ($4.65 million in contemporary dollars) in the early years of the 20th century.

It was one of the last buildings designed by James Knox Taylor, then Supervising Architect for the Treasury Department. He had already established the neoclassical style of the day as his preferred choice for public buildings, to reflect an embrace of the classically influenced ideals of the country's Founding Fathers. The Saratoga Springs post office shares its arched openings with two others in New York (Johnstown and Ithaca), but its Renaissance Revival touches, the columns and decorative brickwork, are found only one other of his post offices in New York, in Olean, designed around the same time. Both aspects make it harmonize well with the other buildings on the intersection, the city hall and Ainsworth Block across Broadway with similarly Italian Renaissance-inspired features and the classically inspired decor on the bank building on the neighboring corner of Church Street.

At the time it was opened the building's lobby was one of the most elaborate in the state. This has been compromised by the removal of the screenline and the substitution of a modern partition wall in the center.

The murals were added in 1936–37 under the Treasury Relief Art Project. The loading dock was added in 1961, and in 1974 the lobby was altered. The original exterior light fixtures have also been replaced. There have been no other major changes to the building.

== See also ==
- National Register of Historic Places listings in Saratoga County, New York
