= West Side Historic District (Saratoga Springs, New York) =

Historic district in New York, United States

- U.S. National Register of Historic Places
- U.S. Historic district
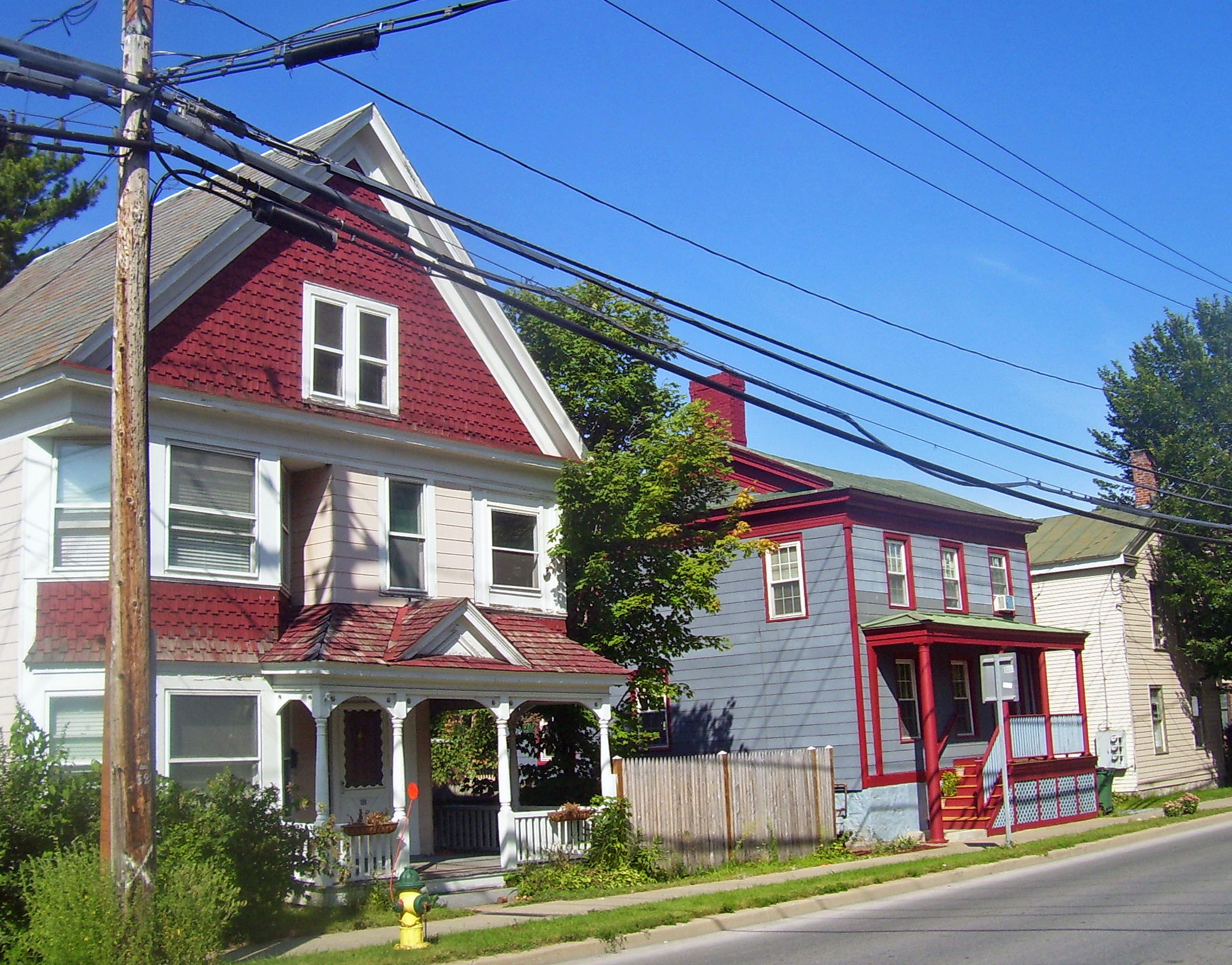
- Houses on Washington Street, south elevation and west profile, 2008

- Location within New York Location within the United States
- Interactive map showing the location of West Side Historic District, Saratoga Springs
- Location: Saratoga Springs, New York
- Coordinates: 43°4′54″N 73°47′19″W
- Area: 122 acres (49 ha)
- Built: 19th and early 20th century
- Architect: Various
- Architectural style: Various period styles
- NRHP reference No.: 94000258
- Added to NRHP: April 4, 1994

The West Side Historic District is a residential area of Saratoga Springs, New York, United States, located west of its downtown section. It is a 122-acre (49 ha) area extending from the blocks west of Broadway to extensions along Church (NY 9N) and Washington (NY 29) streets. The former Franklin Square Historic District is included in its entirety.

The neighborhoods of the district are characterized by modest, intact 19th-century houses in vernacular 19th-century architectural styles. Its development was shaped first by the divisions of the original land grant, and then by the construction of railroads into the community. During the city's peak years as a resort in the later 19th century, the West Side housed its working class. In 1994 it was recognized as a historic district and listed on the National Register of Historic Places. Two of the almost 600 properties within it, a house and a cemetery, are listed on the Register in their own right.

== Geography ==
Within Saratoga Springs, the West Side is generally taken to mean the area from Broadway on the east to the city's western boundary, between Greenfield Avenue on the north and West Circular Street on the south, including Skidmore College and Saratoga Hospital. The historic district's boundaries are more elaborate and include a small portion of that area, reflecting the areas where historic buildings, mostly houses, have remained intact.

=== Boundary ===
On the east the district boundary is generally Woodlawn Avenue or lot lines along it between Walton Street and Greenfield. From there it turns west to exclude some newer construction but then follows Woodlawn and its axis south to Washington Street. At Franklin Square it turns south to follow Grand Street west, sometimes including houses on the south side, as far west as a few houses on the north side just west of Birch Street.

It follows Birch up to the rear lines of the north side of Washington to Marvin Alley, where it turns north. At Division it turns west, then follows some rear lines along West Harrison Street. Remaining along lot lines, it skirts newer construction at the Church-West Harrison intersection, then follows the rear lines along the south side of Church almost to Myrtle Street, just south of the hospital.

After following Church back eastward, it goes up Seward, Pearl and Van Dorn streets to some houses on the west side of Skidmore, then down their rear lines to Pine Alley. After a short eastward section it takes in all the houses on either side of Waterbury Street south of the college and a few on Lawrence Street just north of Waterbury. It returns to Pine Alley in the middle of the block to the east, then follows rear lines along the west of State Street to its northernmost point at Greenfield. From there it follows that street back to Woodlawn.

=== Character ===
Within this boundary there are 500 buildings, mostly wood frame houses, considered of sufficient integrity and age to be contributing properties to the district. An additional 18 sites of former houses are also considered contributing. Another site, and 57 other buildings, are non-contributing.

Most of the houses are located on narrow lots, not more than 60 feet (18 m) wide by 100 feet (30 m) deep, typical of 19th-century development. There are a few more urban areas along Woodlawn, with a mix of uses including commercial and residential.

== History ==
The development of the West Side was forged in the early years by divisions and subdivisions of the land, which created lot lines still followed by streets today. Later on, the railroad created a clear social dividing line which made the West Side the village's working-class neighborhood. The resort era also impacted the district on its fringes.

=== 1768–1813: Land subdivision ===
The West Side's evolution began late in the colonial era, when the Kayaderosseras Patent was subdivided. The patent was originally granted to Robert Livingston and David Schuyler in 1708, but could not be sold or subdivided for 60 years because of a dispute over the Indian deed. When it was, Lot 12 of the patent's 16th General Allotment, where most of the present-day city of Saratoga Springs is located, was assigned to the heirs of Rip Van Dam, one of the original proprietors.

Van Dam's heirs sold to Isaac Low, Jacob Walton and Anthony Van Dam, with all three receiving a piece of the land on which High Rock Spring, then the most valuable aspect of the property, sat. Low was a Loyalist during the subsequent Revolution, and his third was confiscated and sold in 1779. Ultimately these divisions and subdivisions of land would influence lot and street placement within the city and the district.

Walton's son Henry built himself a country seat, called Wood Lawn, on his lands, presently where Skidmore is situated. He eventually purchased enough other land that he came to own Flat Rock Spring and developed it for tourism. He soon got competition when Gideon Putnam acquired Congress Spring to the south (in what is now Congress Park) and began developing hotels there. Both men were also acquiring land to the west of the springs and making lots available. A map Walton published in 1813 is the first in the city to show Church and New streets; it is also the first on which the name Van Dam Street appears.

=== 1833–1907: Railroads and resorts ===
Both Walton and Putnam's son Rockwell were among the founders of the Saratoga and Schenectady Railroad, which opened a line into the village in 1833. The tracks were routed west of Broadway, along New Street, past a station at Division Street, and finally crossed Broadway at Van Dam. They are no longer extant, but their presence shaped the development of the district as well. It gave the neighborhood a center, triggered growth two or three blocks deeper than had previously been taking place and gave the West Side its identity as the less genteel workingman's side of town (the local gentry settled in the East Side).

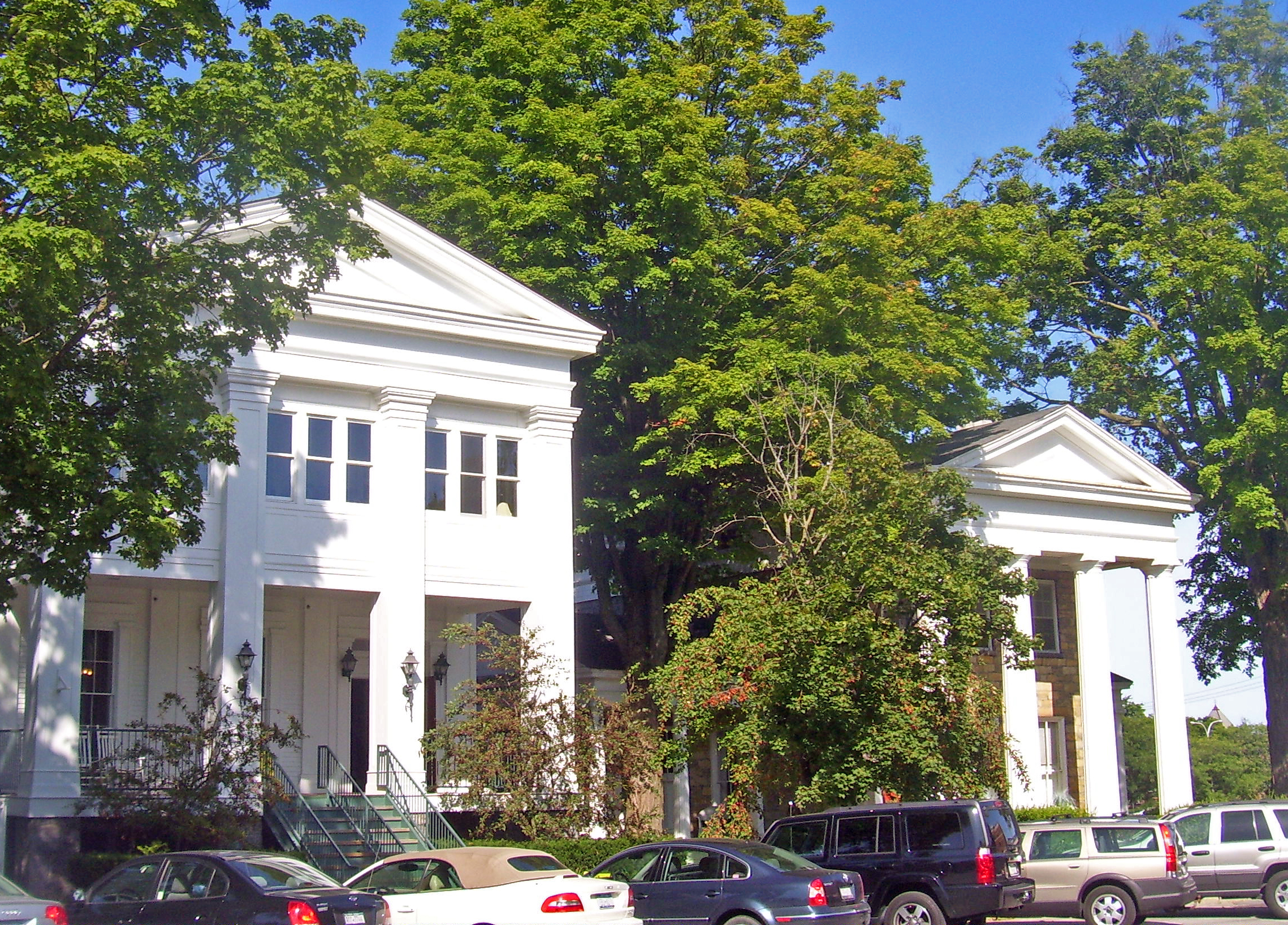
Franklin Square

By the middle of the century, all the land four blocks west of Broadway had been built out, and subdivisions were being carved out of the farmland west of Franklin and Walworth streets. The station's presence at Division and Franklin had created Franklin Square (originally Marvin Square), the only upscale neighborhood on the West Side, with large Greek Revival homes. Just to its west was a poorer neighborhood, originally home to Irish immigrants (later Italians) who arrived via the Adirondack Railway (by then routed along Franklin), giving it the name Dublin, which it still has.

In 1879 Henry Hilton acquired Woodlawn from Walton's heirs (supposedly having raised the money by defrauding the estate of Alexander Turney Stewart) and expanded it lavishly, adding around 600 acres (240 ha). This occurred during Saratoga Springs' peak years as a resort and triggered the construction of lavish vacation homes in the northern reaches of the West Side, abutting the estate. The city's population more than tripled in the three decades between 1850 and 1880. Most of those new inhabitants settled on the West Side.

Saratoga Springs' peak years ended in 1907, when gambling was outlawed. The casino became city property four years later and its land became Congress Park in 1915. Later in the 20th century, urban renewal projects demolished some of the older, neglected buildings in the corridor where the railroad tracks had been. Some of the Woodlawn property became a senior citizens' housing complex with high rises, and Skidmore moved into the land at the north end in 1976.

=== Today ===
Like the city's other historic districts, its historic character is preserved by the city's Design Review Commission, a seven-member body appointed by the mayor to staggered three-year terms. It reviews any proposed signage and exterior changes to any building in any of the city's historic districts.

== Architecture ==
Amid the overwhelmingly residential character of the district, there are a number of different house types reflecting difference in social status of the builder or original owner. Frame predominates as a building material because of the proximity of the Adirondack forests to Saratoga Springs; architecturally the district reflects the vernacular styles found in that region.

The form of the houses was also constrained by the narrow lots, resulting in buildings much deeper than they were wide. Even some of the bungalows built in the mid-20th century on vacant or redeveloped lots within the district were positioned so that the side gable faced the street, with the main entrance likewise located on the side of the lot. In a few cases, two lots were consolidated to build a house with a wide front.

The most upscale residences are the townhouses found on Franklin Square, Church and Woodlawn streets and portions of Clinton and Van Dam streets. Usually two stories tall, they show the greatest attention to the forms of popular contemporary styles and the most elaborate ornamentation, sometimes including surfaces of brick or stone in sections. They often have a generous setback from the street and a porch, sometimes wrapping around the side.

The majority of the district's housing is a type referred to as village residences. These were home to the middle class population which settled the district. They are often one to two stories, located on smaller lots and more restrained in their architecture, with most taking the form of a front-facing gable with inline ells on telescoping on the rear. Most have porches, like the townhouses, yet minimally decorated. A few have side gable wings with some later ones having cross-gabled rears. In the 20th century, many were resided with modern materials like vinyl and aluminum.

Workers' cottages were even smaller and plainer than the village residences, but otherwise similar in form. A few are more than two stories in height; most are one. They have porches but almost no decoration, with rear additions primarily small and service-related. Most use cheaper novelty siding instead of clapboard. They are found in the areas of the district with the smallest and densest lots, primarily the south side of Van Dam between Church and Woodlawn and the northern end of State Street.

Two-family houses were village residences either originally built or later modified to house an owner and tenant. They are generally similar to that form, except for some turn-of-the-century designs where architects took advantage of the larger size to scale the form up. Some were divided vertically to look like two row houses. They are usually two stories in height, taking up most of the larger lots they occupy, leaving little room for yards.

Higher-density rental housing took the form of tenements, large three-story flat-roofed buildings that contain more than two units. They were usually owned by an absentee landlord. Most are on back streets, like Russell or Waterbury streets, and unornamented. A slightly more stylish example from later in the district's development can be found at 190–94 Grand Street.

Some houses had outbuildings which are also included as contributing properties. Most are stables or carriage houses later converted to garages. These were usually utilitarian gabled sheds with a bay for a single horse and wagon (the exception being those that served the upscale homes of Franklin Square). A few later ones were built for automobiles. Their main impact on the district was the creation of the alleys in mid-block, later expanded into streets in their own right.

== Significant contributing properties ==
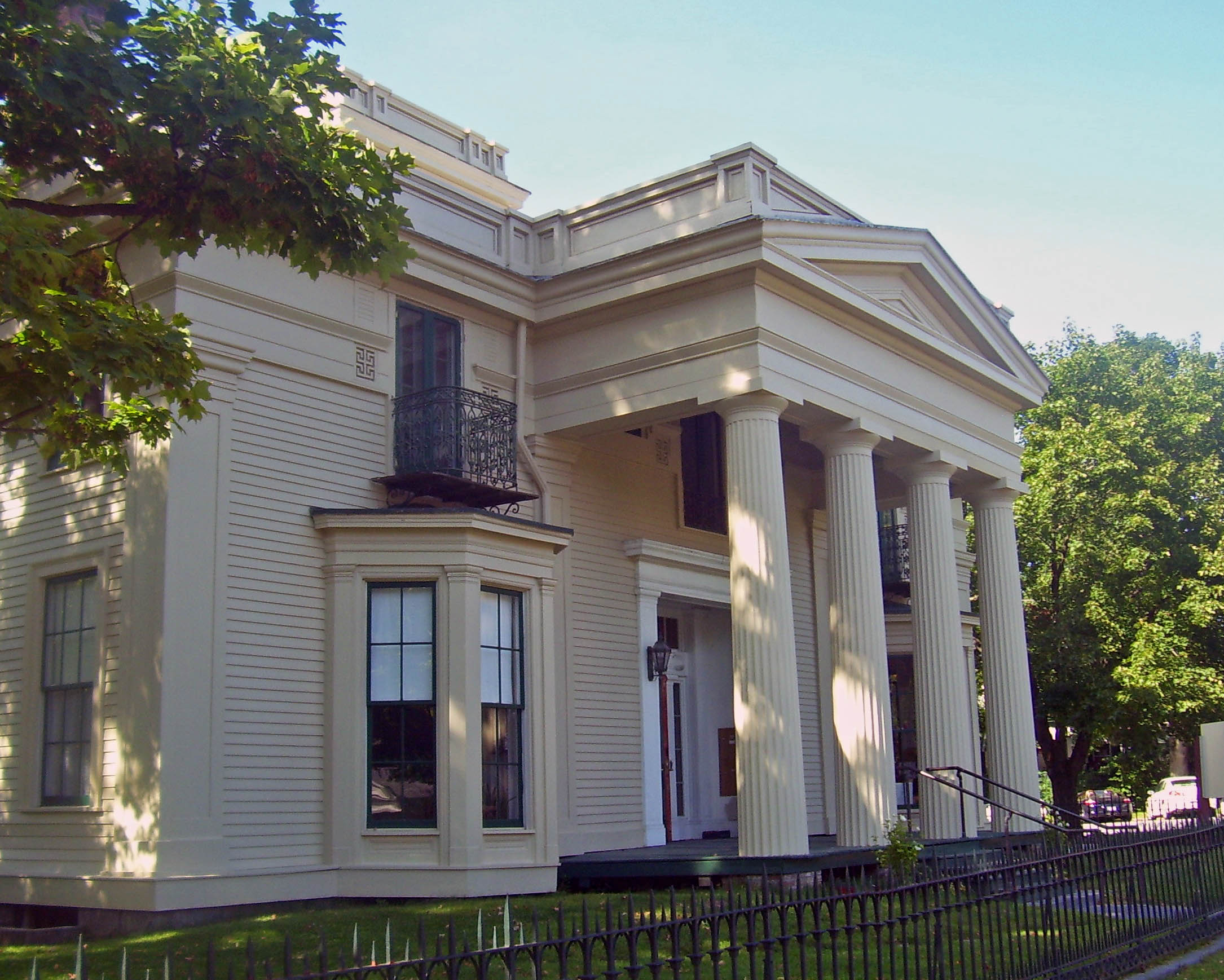
Hiram Charles Todd House

The West Side Historic District was preceded by another, smaller district. Two properties within that district were later separately listed on the National Register, and there are some other notable properties within the current district.

- Franklin Square. Added to the Register in 1972 as the city's first historic district, it contains 87 properties in its 30 acres (120,000 m^{2}). Most are upscale mid-19th century residences and outbuildings taking advantage of the proximity of the railroad station, newly built at the time.
- Hiram Charles Todd House, 4 Franklin Square. This ornate Greek Revival house on Franklin Square, one of the city's first listings on the Register, was probably built around 1837. It takes its name from Todd, a prominent lawyer and jurist descended from the original owners, who lived there in the early 20th century.
- Holmes Block, 102–08 Woodlawn Avenue. This group of four rowhouses was built over the two decades after the Civil War in the Second Empire style, with mansard roofs and dormer windows. They retain their original marble flooring at the entrances.
- Tenement at 190–94 Grand Avenue. This 1896 group of three two-unit attached houses was designed by R. Newton Brezee, known for his grand houses elsewhere in town. It features more decoration than other tenements in the district, such as bracketed cornices.

== See also ==
- National Register of Historic Places listings in Saratoga County, New York
- East Side Historic District (Saratoga Springs, New York)
- Broadway Historic District (Saratoga Springs, New York)
- Casino-Congress Park-Circular Street Historic District.
- Union Avenue Historic District (Saratoga Springs, New York)
