= East Side Historic District (Saratoga Springs, New York) =

Historic district in New York, United States

- U.S. National Register of Historic Places
- U.S. Historic district
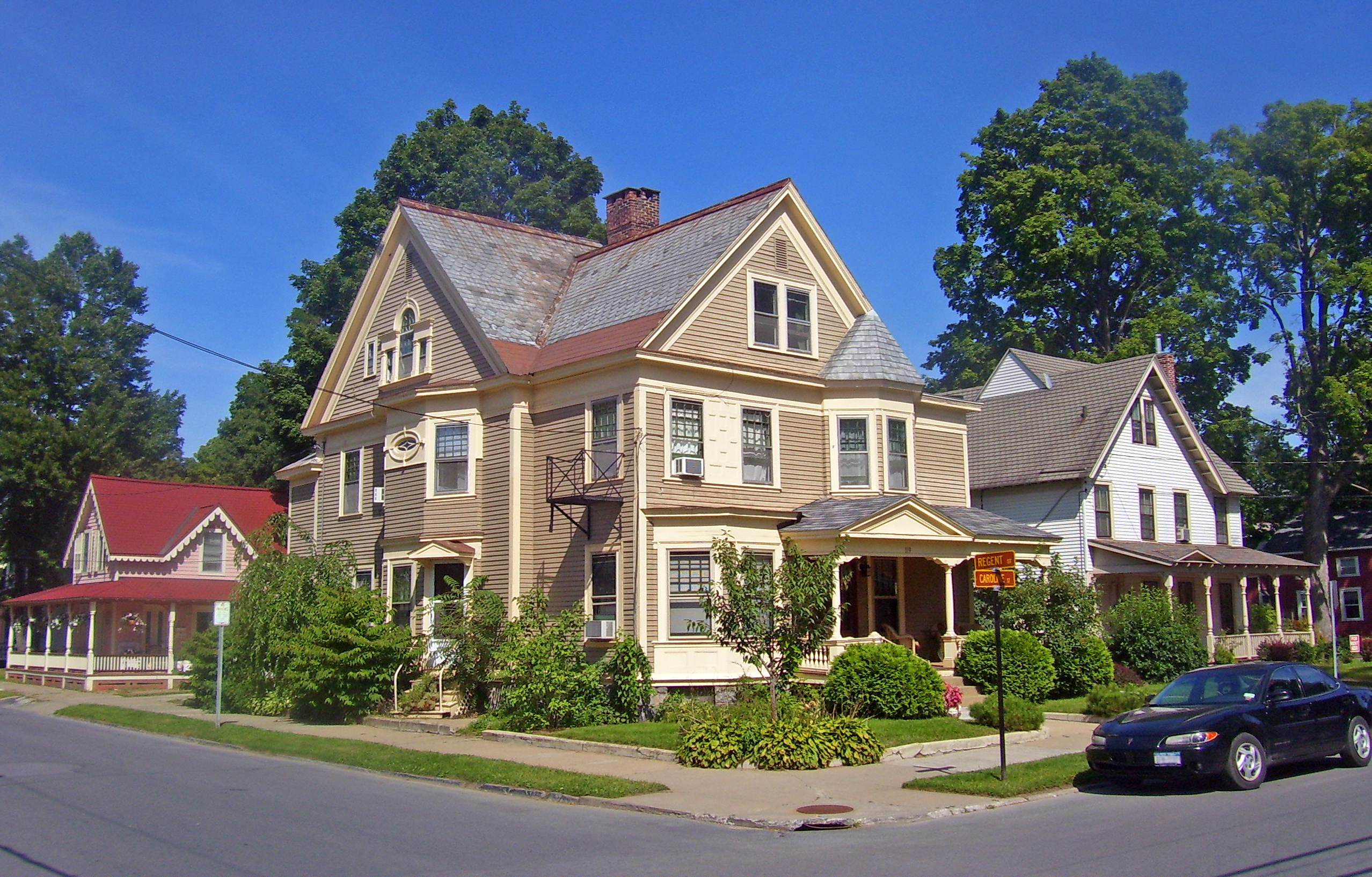
- House of architect R. Newton Brezee at Caroline and Regent streets, 2008

- Location within New York Location within the United States
- Interactive map showing the location of East Side Historic District, Saratoga Springs
- Location: Saratoga Springs, NY
- Coordinates: 43°4′48″N 73°46′38″W
- Area: 114 acres (46 ha)
- Built: 19th–mid 20th centuries
- Architectural style: Various period styles
- NRHP reference No.: 82001267
- Added to NRHP: October 29, 1982

The East Side Historic District is a primarily residential neighborhood located east of downtown Saratoga Springs, New York, United States. It is an irregularly shaped area 114 acres (46 ha) in size, extending almost to Saratoga Race Course from the neighborhood of Congress Park.

During the 19th and early 20th centuries, it was where the city's well-to-do residents built their homes, when the city was one of the country's top resorts, frequented by many of the wealthiest families of the era. Later on it was home to the earliest incarnations of Skidmore College. In 1982 it was listed on the National Register of Historic Places.

== Geography ==
East Side is one of five historic districts, all contiguous, in the city. It is bordered by Union Avenue on the south, Congress Park to the west and Broadway on the northwest.

=== Boundary ===
The district's irregular boundary follows primarily lot lines and streets. It begins in the north at the intersection of Circular and North streets, including the properties on both sides of Circular at that point. From there it goes east along North to East Harrison Street, where it turns south. Houses on York Avenue all the way east to Nelson Avenue are included, followed by the rear lot line of houses on the west side of East Harrison south of that intersection (excluding the entire block at Middle Avenue). It then returns to East Harrison along Swanner Lane and follows the back lines along some of the houses along Lake Avenue (NY 29)

Opposite Marion Place, it goes out to Lake and follows it east to the middle of the block between Marion and Nelson Avenue. There, it turns south between two properties to eventually follow Diamond Place. It takes in the house at the corner of Diamond Place and Diamond Street, then follows the latter west to the line between two lots and goes south to Mitchell Place. It follows Mitchell out to Nelson and then turns south briefly to continue east along the rear lot lines of the north side of Caroline Street to include three lots east of Ludlow Street.

From there it continues south to the middle of the block, including all properties on Labelle Lane. It follows rear lot lines again along Fifth Avenue to East Avenue, which it follows south to the rear lot line of the properties on the south side of Fifth, excluding the stables and other track support buildings. This point is the district's eastern extreme.

The boundary continues to divide houses and racetrack buildings down to George Street, where it turns west. Other than including the house at 60 George, on the southwest corner of the Nelson Avenue intersection, it remains in George Street all the way to Court Street. There it dips southward again and follows Thompson Place to Regent Street.

It goes to its southernmost point which includes all properties along the west side of Regent down to Union Avenue (NY 9P)/ It hen follows its rear lines north to Spring Street, where it turns west again. It turns north around a property at the northeast corner of Spring and Henry Street, then goes west to follow Henry up to Caroline. There it goes east to the middle of the block and then follows lot lines to Lake.

After following the rear lines of two properties next to the armory on Henry at the northeast corner of Lake, it includes one more house on Henry and then follows a driveway to Bank Alley, where it turns west to Henry again. It follows Henry, then the rear line along the east of the street until it reaches that of the house opposite North Street, where it turns east.

=== Character ===
The district's terrain is mostly level, most of it east of the rise from the small fault where the city's springs are located. It is extensively developed, with streets and narrower connecting alleys laid out in a grid plan.

There are 379 buildings within the district, many of them houses in an array of 19th and early 20th century styles, from Gothic Revival to Bungalow. They are predominantly faced in clapboard or brick. Only 15 of them are of modern construction, including one supermarket building, and thus not considered contributing properties to the district's historic character.

A few institutional buildings remain from Skidmore College's use of the area prior to 1976, especially its former art school near the west boundary. The state armory on Lake Avenue, one of many designed by Isaac Perry, is also included, as well as a church, fire station and local elementary school.

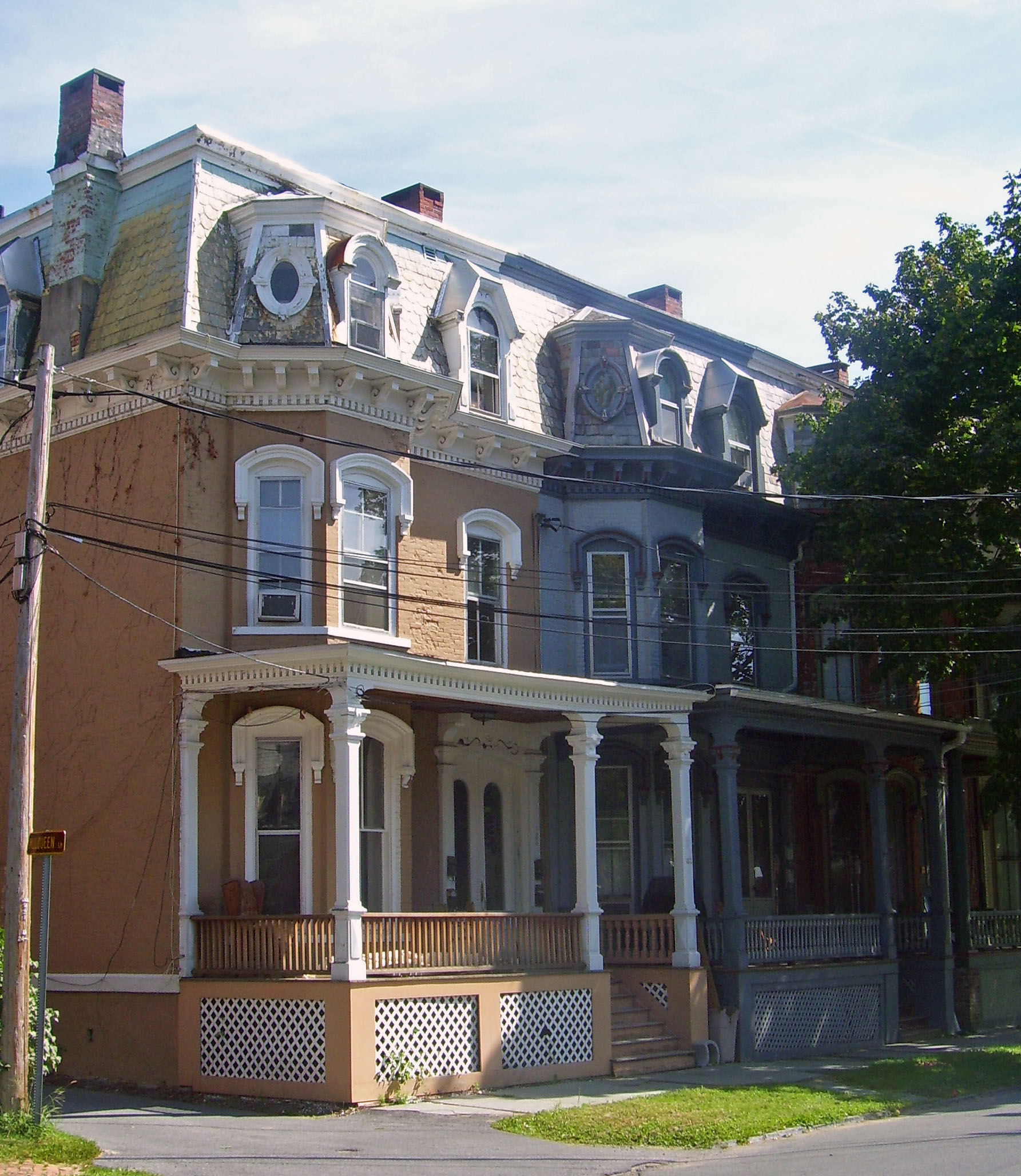
1870s rowhouses on Regent Street

== History ==
As Saratoga Springs began to develop into one of the country's most fashionable resorts in the late 19th century, it developed its upper and upper-middle class. These people, primarily the owners of stores and spas and those who owned the firms that designed and built them, wanted to live in houses that reflected their success. They gravitated to the neighborhoods east of upper Broadway and north of Union Avenue, where the wealthy summer residents had their homes. Their own homes were scaled-down versions of those homes, often by the same architects, including R. Newton Brezee, who himself lived on the East Side.

In 1902 Lucy Skidmore Scribner founded the Young Women's Industrial Club. It became Skidmore School of the Arts a decade later, in 1911, and finally Skidmore College in 1922. The Regent Street Theatre was the first building constructed specifically for the college. By 1931 the campus dominated the western portion of the district, with 82 buildings either built or renovated for it over 34 acres (14 ha). In 1976 it moved to a new campus in the city's north, and left most of its original buildings.

Currently its historic character is preserved by the city's Design Review Commission, a seven-member body appointed by the mayor to staggered three-year terms. It reviews any proposed signage and exterior changes to any building in any of the city's historic districts.

== Significant contributing properties ==
None of the properties in the district are currently listed on the National Register in their own right. Some are notable within it.

- R. Newton Brezee House, 119 Caroline Street. This Clapboard Queen Anne designed as his own residence by the architect of many homes in the city, including several others in the district, and built in 1892.
- New York State Armory, 60 Lake Avenue. A Romanesque Revival brick structure designed by state architect Isaac Perry in 1890.
- Regent Street Theatre, 153 Regent Street. Shingled Colonial Revival structure was first building built for Skidmore, in 1903.

== See also ==
- National Register of Historic Places listings in Saratoga County, New York
- Broadway Historic District (Saratoga Springs, New York)
- Casino-Congress Park-Circular Street Historic District.
- Union Avenue Historic District (Saratoga Springs, New York)
- West Side Historic District (Saratoga Springs, New York)
