= Robert Newton Brezee =

American architect

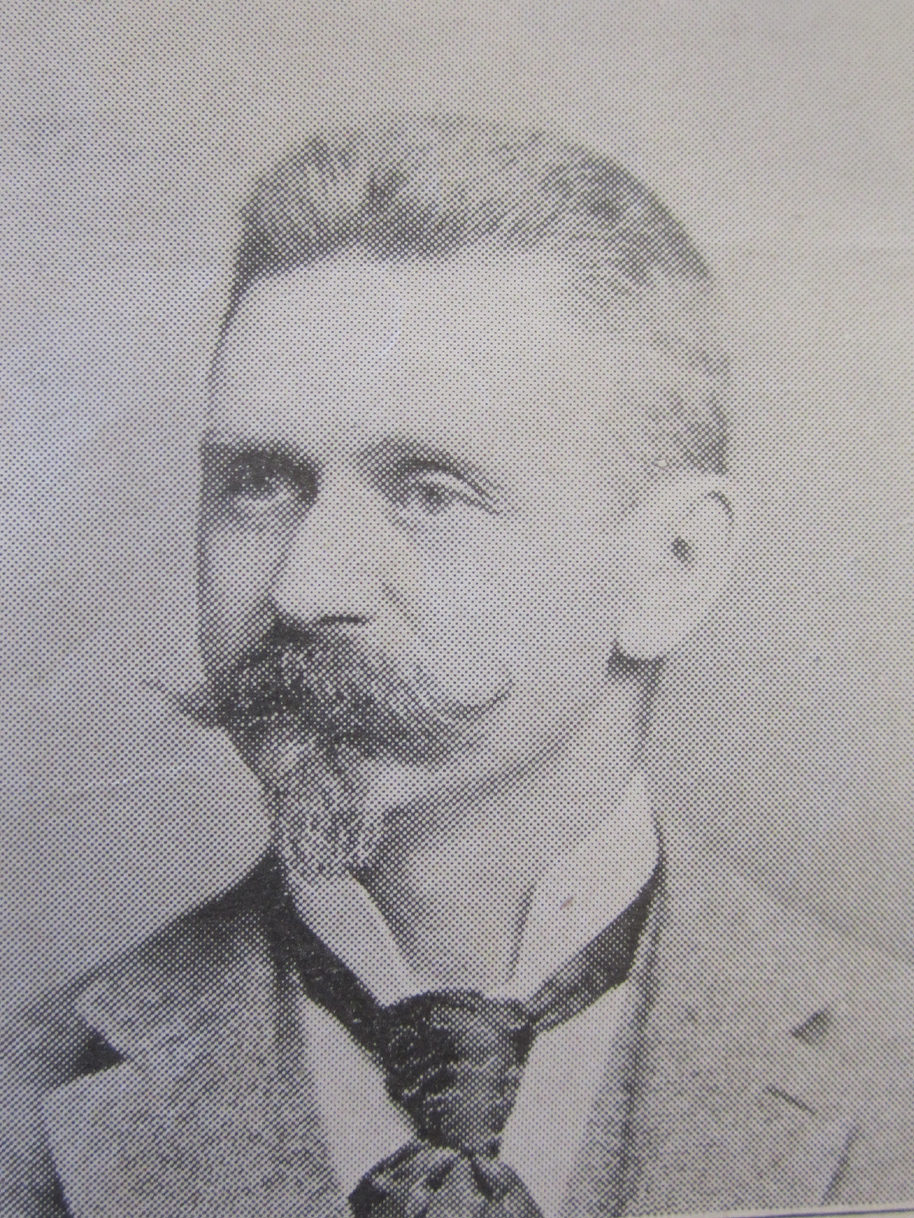
Robert Newton Brezee in 1892

Robert Newton Brezee (1851–1929), usually referred to as R. Newton Brezee or Newton Brezee, was an American architect chiefly active in Saratoga Springs, New York, and surrounding areas.

== Professional ==
Brezee came to Saratoga Springs in 1867. He worked as a carpenter, and left Saratoga for a while to work on the planned community of Garden City, Long Island built by Alexander Turney Stewart. A self-taught architect, he returned to Saratoga Springs and opened an office in 1884. He is credited with the design of more than fifty buildings.

== Personal ==
Brezee was born on September 26, 1851, in Middleburgh, New York. He married Jennie M. Carr (1855–1950) on July 25, 1881, in Saratoga Springs. The couple had four daughters: Edna Winford Brezee (1882–1971), Claire M. Brezee (born 1885) (Mrs. Samuel J. Mott), Elizabeth L. Brezee (1887–1989), and Dorothy Newton Brezee (1897–1949).

Brezee died in 1929; he and Jennie are buried in Greenridge Cemetery in Saratoga Springs.

== Buildings designed ==
Brezee designed primarily in the Queen Anne and Colonial Revival styles. Many Brezee-designed buildings have been preserved in the Union Avenue Historic District and the East Side Historic District in Saratoga Springs. The following is a partial list of these and of his other works:

City	Address	Building type	Date	Photo
Saratoga Springs	105 Lake Ave.	Single-family home	1884	
Saratoga Springs	130 Circular St.	Single-family home	1890	
Ballston Spa	George West Office Building, within Union Mill Complex, Milton Ave. (NY 50)	Queen Anne-style 2-story brick office building	1884	
Saratoga Springs	159 Division Street	Single-family home	1884–85	
Raquette Lake	Antlers	Hotel	1885	
Saratoga Springs	75 Caroline Street	Single-family home	1885-86	
Saratoga Springs	10 Fifth Avenue	Single-family home	1886	
Saratoga Springs	156 Caroline Street	Summer home	1886-87	
Saratoga Springs	109 Caroline Street	Single-family home	1887	
Saratoga Springs	511 Broadway	Office and residence of Dr. Douglas C Moriarta	1887	
Saratoga Springs	487 Broadway	Residence of Davis Coleman	1887	
Saratoga Springs	167 Grand Avenue	Single-family home	1887	
Saratoga Springs	628 North Broadway	Single-family home	1887	
Saratoga Springs	170-172 Spring Street	Duplex	1887	
Saratoga Springs	203 Union Avenue	Single-family home	1888	
Saratoga Springs	114 Caroline Street	Single-family home	1888	
Saratoga Springs	34 Clark Street	Single-family home	1888–89	
Saratoga Springs	59 State Street	Single-family home	1888–89	
Saratoga Springs	5 Fifth Avenue	Single-family home	1889	
Saratoga Springs	119 Caroline Street	Single-family home	1891	
Saratoga Springs	153 Phila Street	Single-family home	1892–93	
Saratoga Springs	179 Caroline Street	Single-family home	1896	
Saratoga Springs	86 Court Street	Residence	1896	
Saratoga Springs	190-194 Grand Avenue	Row houses	1896	
Saratoga Springs	91 Circular Street	Residence	1896	
Saratoga Springs	135 Lake Avenue	Single-family home	1896	
Saratoga Springs	16 Marion Place	Single-family home	1896	
Saratoga Springs	22 Marion Place	Single-family home	1896	
Saratoga Springs	21 Van Dam Street	Church	1897	
Saratoga Springs	136 Circular Street	Single-family home (expansion)	1898	
Corinth	First Baptist Church	Church	1898	
Saratoga Springs	5 Madison Avenue	Single-family home	1898	
Saratoga Springs	19 Marion Place	Single-family home	1899	
Saratoga Springs	96 Lake Avenue	Single-family home	1899–1900	
Saratoga Springs	112 Spring Street	School	1900	
Saratoga Springs	55 Union Avenue	Single-family home	1901	
Saratoga Springs	Church Street at West Avenue	Saratoga Golf Club—club house	1902	Demolished
Saratoga Springs	205 Broadway	Single-family home	1902	Demolished
Saratoga Springs	90 Lake Avenue	Single-family home	c.1902	
Saratoga Springs	9 Marion Place	Single-family home	1902	
Saratoga Springs	122 Regent Street	Carriage house	1902	
Saratoga Springs	120 Circular Street	Residence	1903	
Saratoga Springs	28 Union Avenue	Single-family home	1903	
Saratoga Springs	56 Union Ave.	Single-family home	1903	
Saratoga Springs	142 Lake Avenue	Single-family home	1904	
Saratoga Springs	687 North Broadway	Single-family home	1904	
Saratoga Springs	64-66 Ludlow Street the former "Hawley Children's Home"	Children's home	1904	
Saratoga Springs	25 Fifth Avenue	Single-family home	1906	
Lake George	Triuna Island	Summer retreat of Spencer and Katrina Trask	1906-7	
Saratoga Springs	Union Avenue	Yaddo— "West House"	1906–12	
Corinth	611 Palmer Avenue	Palmer Avenue School	1908	
Round Lake	US Route 9	Summer home	1908	
Barkersville	Administration building and Pavilion number 1 Saratoga County Sanitorium	Sanitorium	1913	
Saratoga Springs	75 Ludlow Street	Single-family home	ca.1928	
