= Broadway Historic District (Saratoga Springs, New York) =

Historic district in New York, United States

- U.S. National Register of Historic Places
- U.S. Historic district
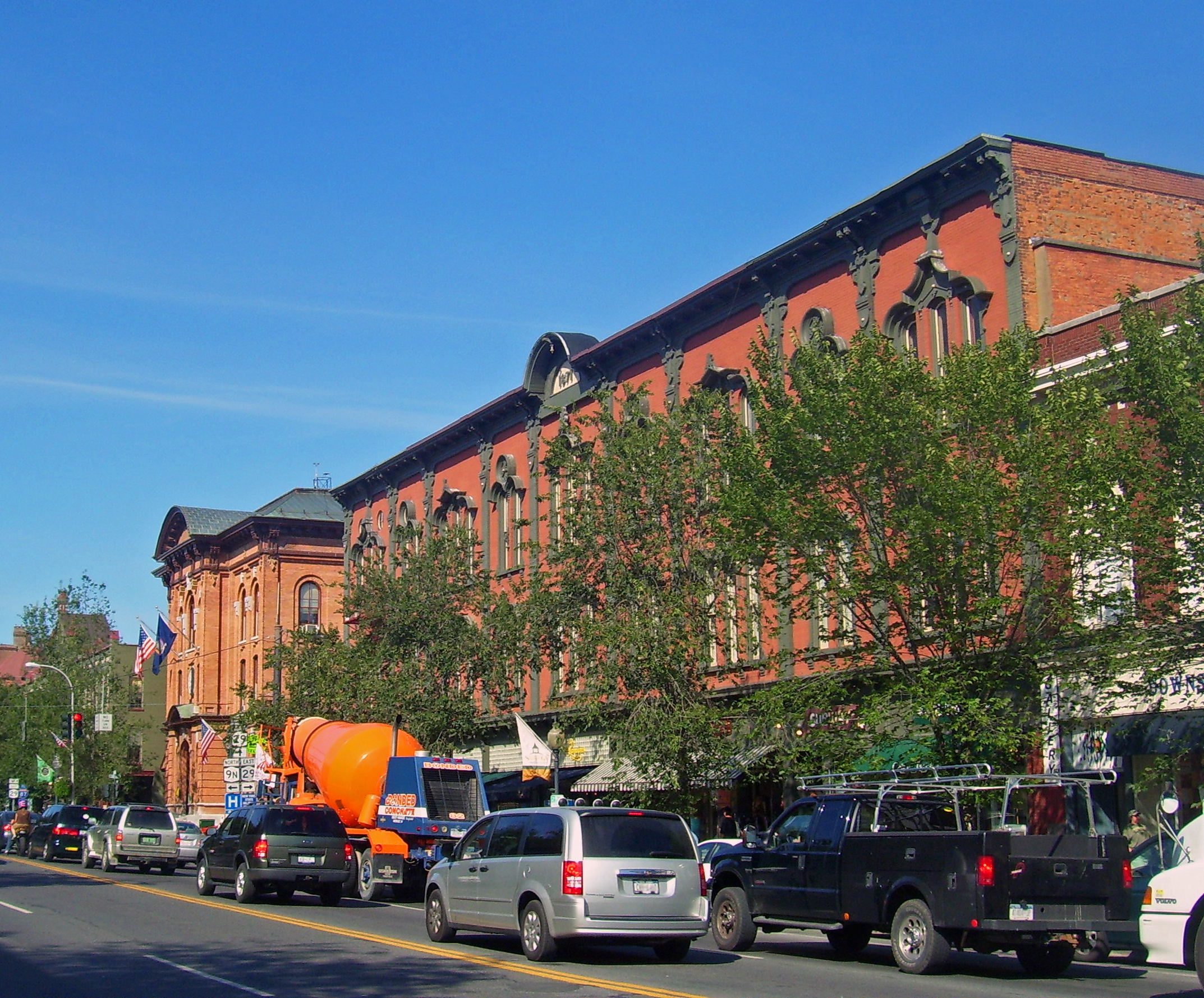
- City Hall and Ainsworth building, west elevations, 2008

- Location within New York Location within the United States
- Interactive map showing the location for Broadway Historic District
- Location: Saratoga Springs, NY
- Coordinates: 43°5′12″N 73°47′1″W
- Area: 137 acres (55 ha)
- Built: 1865–1920
- Architect: Richard Upjohn; Cummings & Burt
- Architectural style: Greek Revival, Classical Revival, Late Victorian, Queen Anne, Italianate, Late 19th And 20th Century Revivals
- NRHP reference No.: 79001627 (original); 83001789 (increase 1); 94000049 (increase 2)

Significant dates
- Added to NRHP: September 12, 1979
- Boundary increases: April 15, 1983; February 25, 1994

The Broadway Historic District is located along Broadway in Saratoga Springs, New York, United States. It has a twofold character. The southern section is the commercial core of the city, with many of its important public and private buildings, most intact from its peak days as a resort town in that era. North Broadway is a residential neighborhood with many large Victorian houses built by frequent visitors to the town and its spas and racetrack.

In 1979 it was recognized as a historic district and listed on the National Register of Historic Places. Since then its boundaries have twice been increased to include some adjacent areas after new information became available about the buildings in them, one of which is a church by Richard Upjohn. Another contributing property, the post office, was later listed on the Register in its own right.

== Geography ==
The district follows a one-mile (1.6 km) stretch of Broadway and North Broadway, from the vicinity of Congress Park to a small portion that overlaps into the Town of Greenfield just north of the city limits near Skidmore College, where the street becomes Glen Mitchell Road. It is divided into residential and commercial sections by the intersection with Van Dam Street roughly midway between its two termini. Some portions of neighboring blocks and streets are included.

The south end is at the junction of Broadway (also US 9/NY 50) and Spring Street (NY 9P). Some of the properties on Spring to the east (where the district is bordered by the East Side Historic District and Washington Street (NY 29) as far as Woodlawn Avenue to the west are included. Both sides of Broadway (120 feet (37 m) wide at this point) are included to the junction with Church Street (NY 9N's southern terminus on the west, and NY 29 on the east), at the post office and city hall, along with properties half a block deep in either direction.

At Grove Street the eastern boundary returns to the side of Broadway in order to exclude some more modern buildings on that side. Two blocks to the north, at Van Dam, routes 9 and 50 split off from Broadway to the northeast and become a divided highway. Here the boundary again takes in buildings around High Rock Spring on the east as it becomes Broadway Avenue for a block, then Rock Street and Greenfield Avenue. The west boundary follows Wiswall Lane to include houses on the east side of Woodlawn (Some of the areas on the other side are in the West Side Historic District).

The east boundary gradually follows rear property lines until First Street, where it runs down the middle of Bryant Street, including the houses on its west side except for some near the Fourth Street junction at the city line. The houses opposite Skidmore's main entrance are included; at the city line the west boundary begins.

Within this area delineated are 137 acres (55 ha) and over 160 buildings. In the northern half these are residential; to the south they are predominantly commercial with a few churches near the south end.

== History ==
High Rock Spring was known to the native peoples of the area and had long been visited by them for its supposed curative powers. In 1643 Father Isaac Jogues became the first European visitor to see it. Mohawks reportedly carried Sir William Johnson there on a stretcher in 1767, and his recovery went so well that he visited it again later several times. It was well known enough that George Washington tried to buy it in 1783.

Gideon Putnam, considered the founder of Saratoga Springs, bought the land around Congress Spring to the south in 1802. He built the first hotel there and eight years later laid out a plan for the city's development. Broadway was always intended to be the main commercial street, and others built hotels on land sold to them by Putnam and his descendants. The coming of the railroad in the 1830s accentuated this, as it paralleled Broadway just to the west.

The tracks crossed Broadway at the Van Dam junction, following the route now used by routes 9 and 50. This created the break between commercial Broadway and residential North Broadway in the later years of the 19th century. Like the builders of the houses along Union Avenue, the North Broadway homeowners were primarily wealthy summer residents. But Union Avenue's visitors came from all over the country for the horse races, whereas those on North Broadway were from further south in the Capital District and primarily came to Saratoga Springs to take advantage of the baths and get away for the summer.

Today that area is home to a number of notable owners and trainers in thoroughbred racing. The district's historic character is preserved by the city's Design Review Commission, a seven-member body appointed by the mayor to staggered three-year terms. It reviews any proposed signage and exterior changes to any building in any of the city's historic districts.

== Significant contributing properties ==
- Adelphi Hotel, 361–65 Broadway. Built in 1877, this is the last surviving hotel from the 19th century. The porch, which features slender columns and open spandrels became known as the "Saratoga porch" because it was typical of the time and place.
- Adirondack Trust Company Building, 473 Broadway. This is a marble-faced 1916 Beaux-Arts bank building by Alfred Hopkins featuring Tiffany bronze doors and chandeliers. All the decoration inside and out has Adirondack themes.
- S.W. Ainsworth Building, 456–70 Broadway. Ornate High Victorian brick three-story commercial block with pediment dating it to 1871.
- Bethesda Episcopal Church, 28 Washington Street. Richard Upjohn's original 1842 Gothic Revival design was enhanced in 1887 with a tower and new front facade.
- City Hall, 474 Broadway. Ornate three-story brick Italianate building built in 1871 by Cummings & Burt of Troy.
- Collamer Building, 480–94 Broadway. This large 1884 commercial building, similar in mass (three stories, 18 bays) to the Ainsworth Building down the street has a Queen Anne gable with miniature turrets.
- Ellis House, 720 North Broadway. This two-and-a-half-story Romanesque Revival house is believed to have been built 1885–86 by Albany architect Albert Fuller. Has a three-story engaged tower and widow's walk.
- High Rock Spring, Maple Avenue at Rock Street. The first known mineral water spring in the area flows in a polygonal stone springhouse below a steep ledge.
- President's House, 670 North Broadway. The home of Skidmore's president is a 2 1/2-story Colonial Revival frame house with projecting columned portico built between 1895 and 1900.
- Reverey Gardens, 595 North Broadway. Hopkins designed this two-story Colonial Revival frame house in 1922. Ellen Shipman designed the gardens.
- U.S. Post Office, 475 Broadway. Treasury Department supervising architect James Knox Taylor designed this Classical Revival building in 1910. At that time it had the most elaborate lobby of any post office in the state.
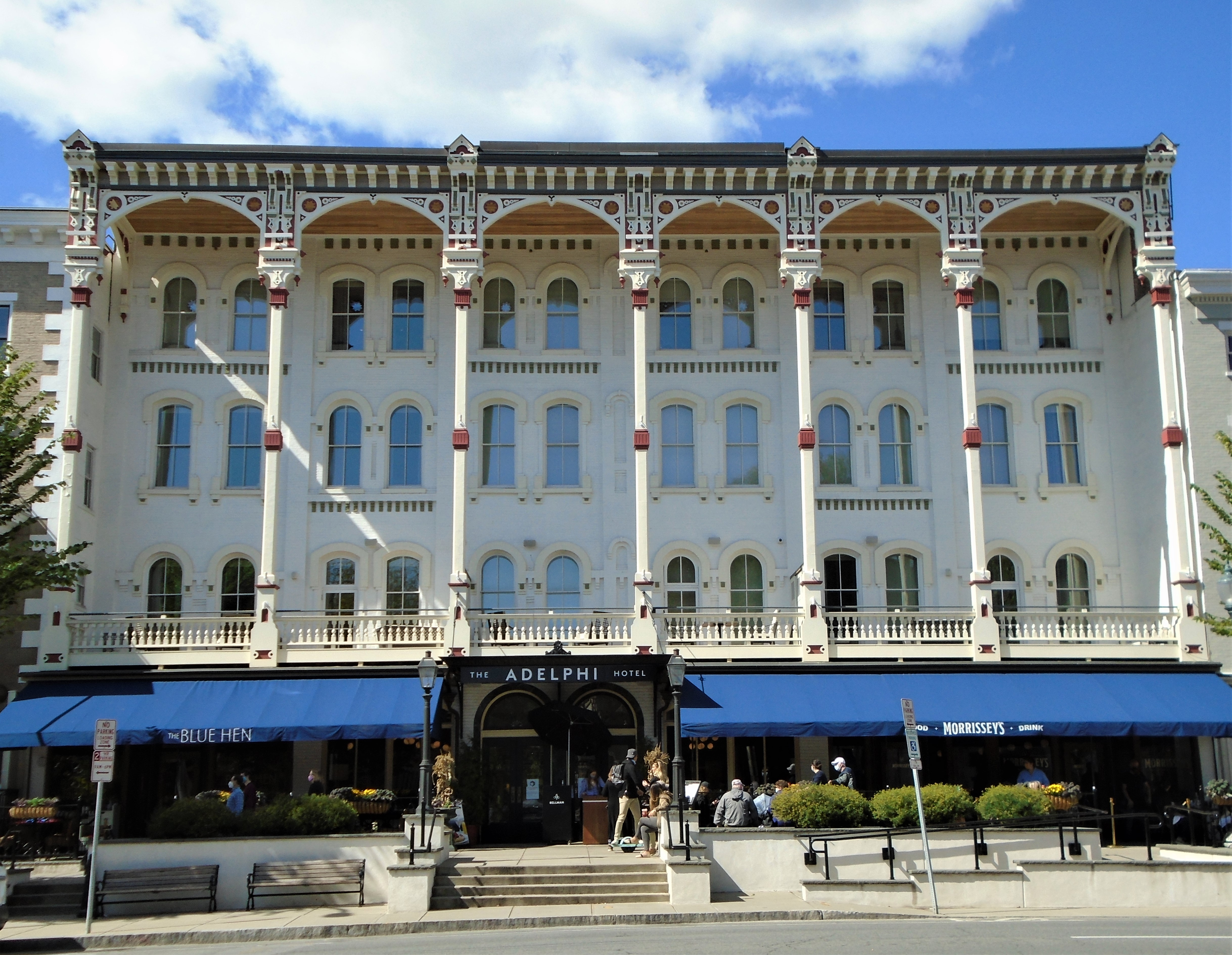
Adelphi Hotel

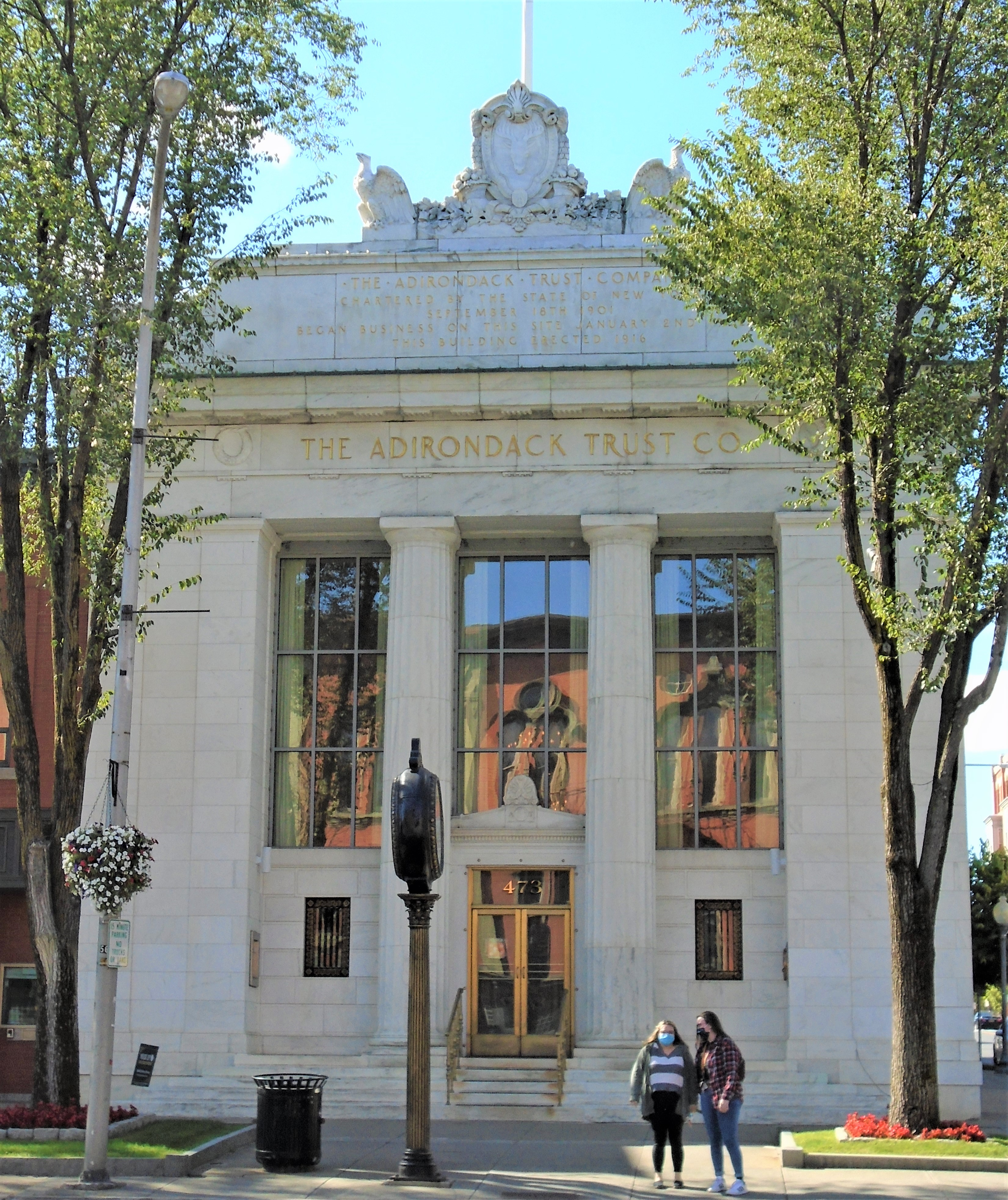
Adirondack Trust Company Building

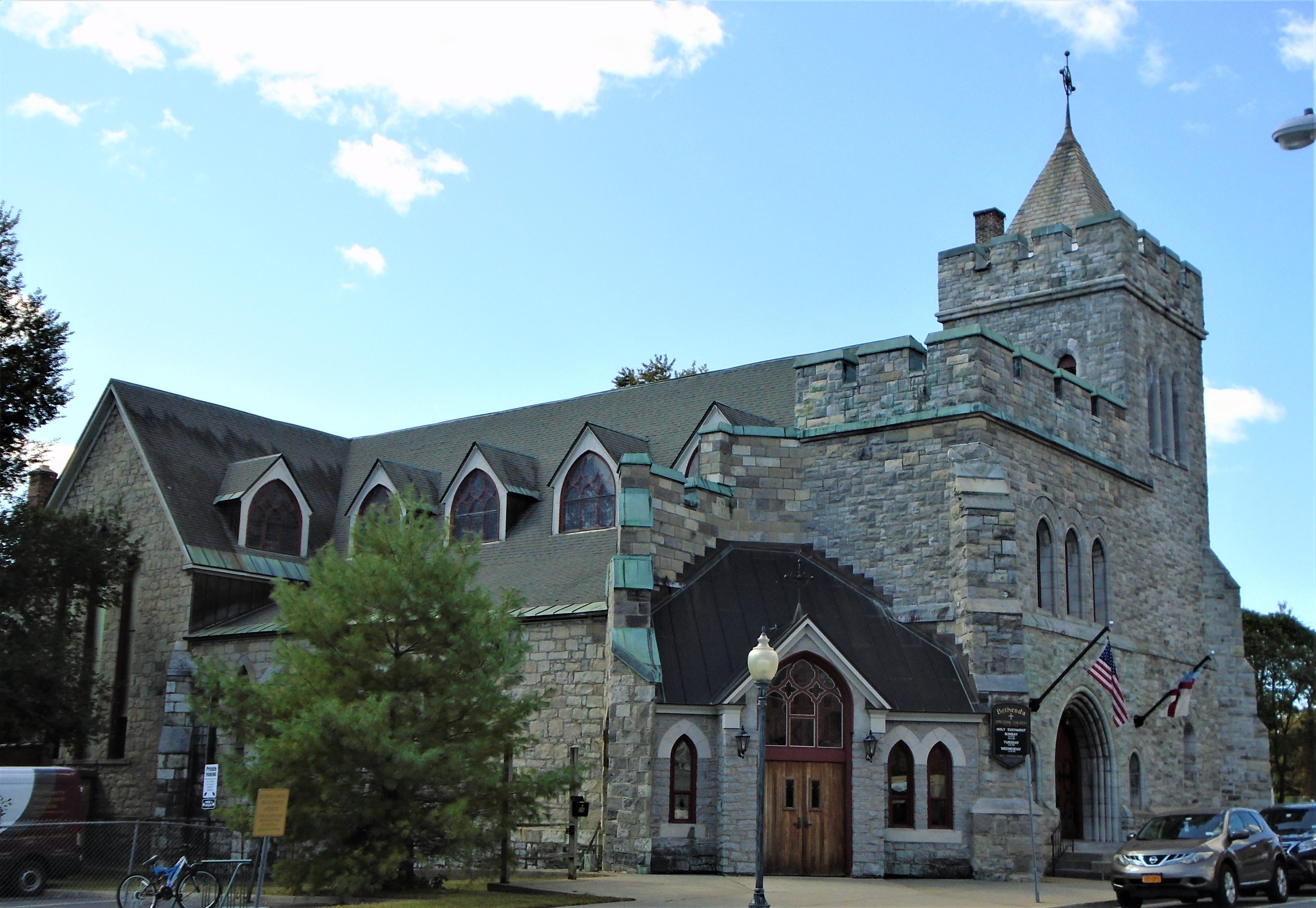
Bethesda Episcopal Church

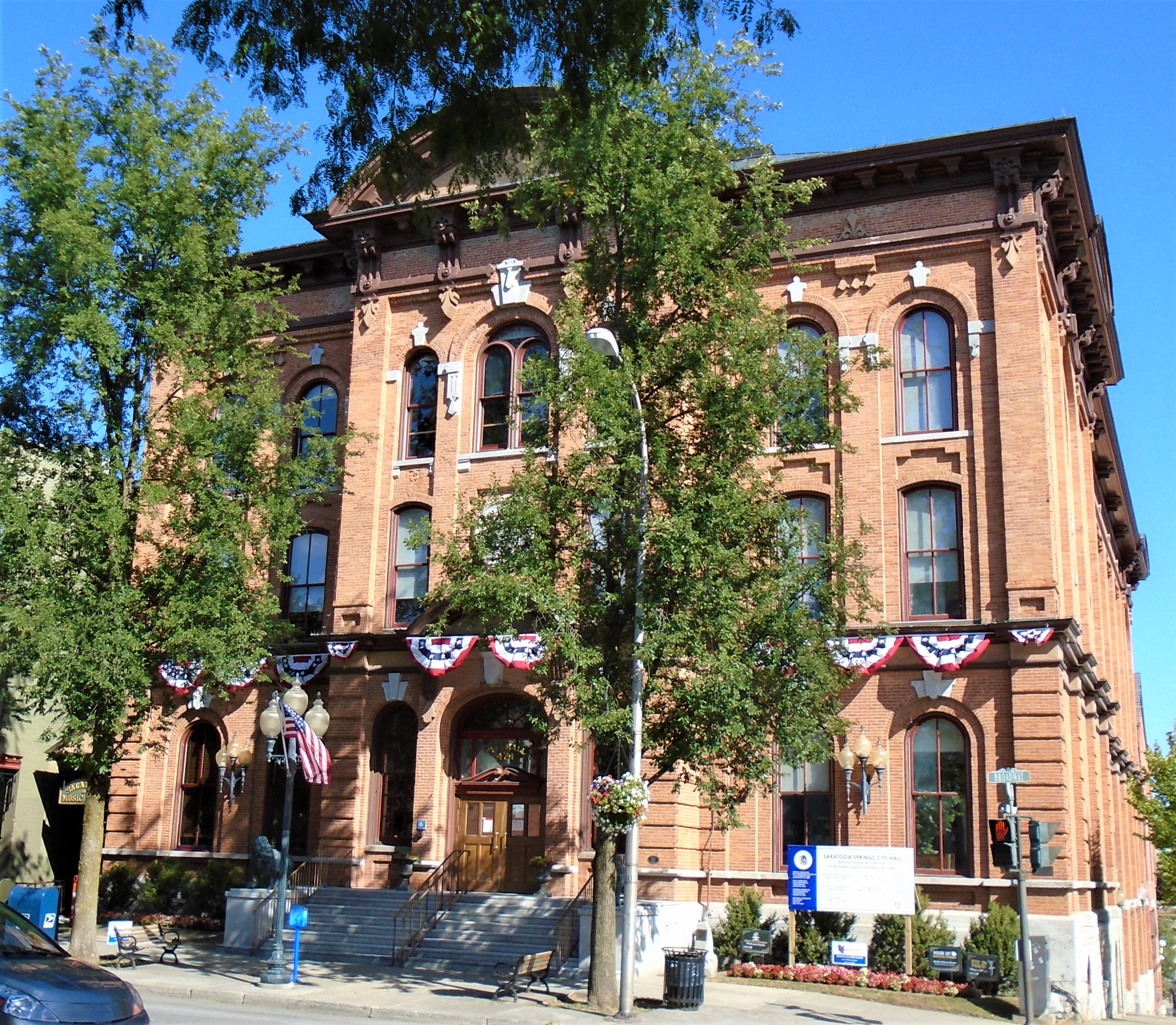
City Hall

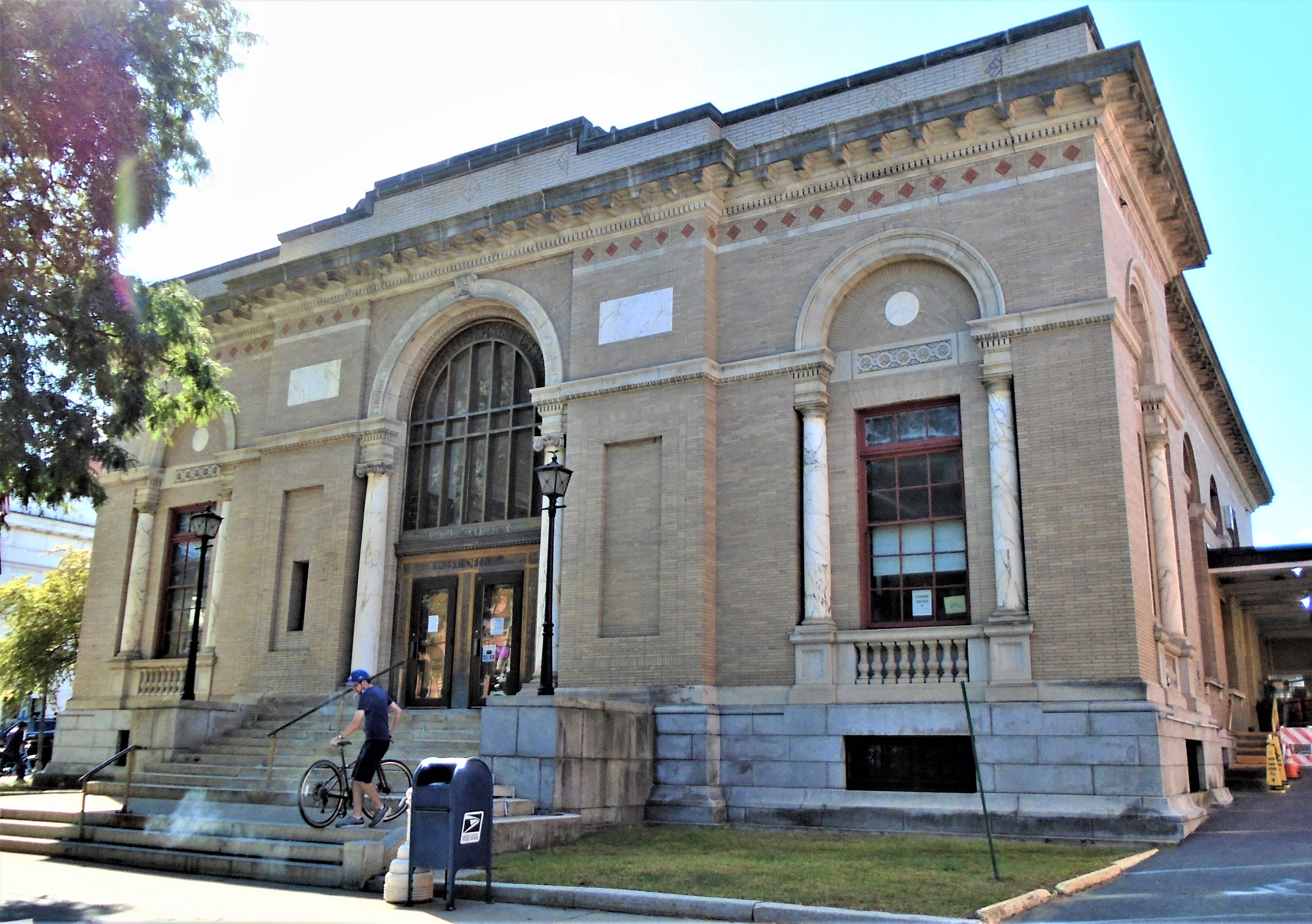
U.S. Post Office

== See also ==
- National Register of Historic Places listings in Saratoga County, New York
- Casino-Congress Park-Circular Street Historic District.
- East Side Historic District (Saratoga Springs, New York)
- West Side Historic District (Saratoga Springs, New York)
- Union Avenue Historic District (Saratoga Springs, New York)
