= Canfield Casino and Congress Park =

- U.S. National Register of Historic Places
- U.S. National Historic Landmark District
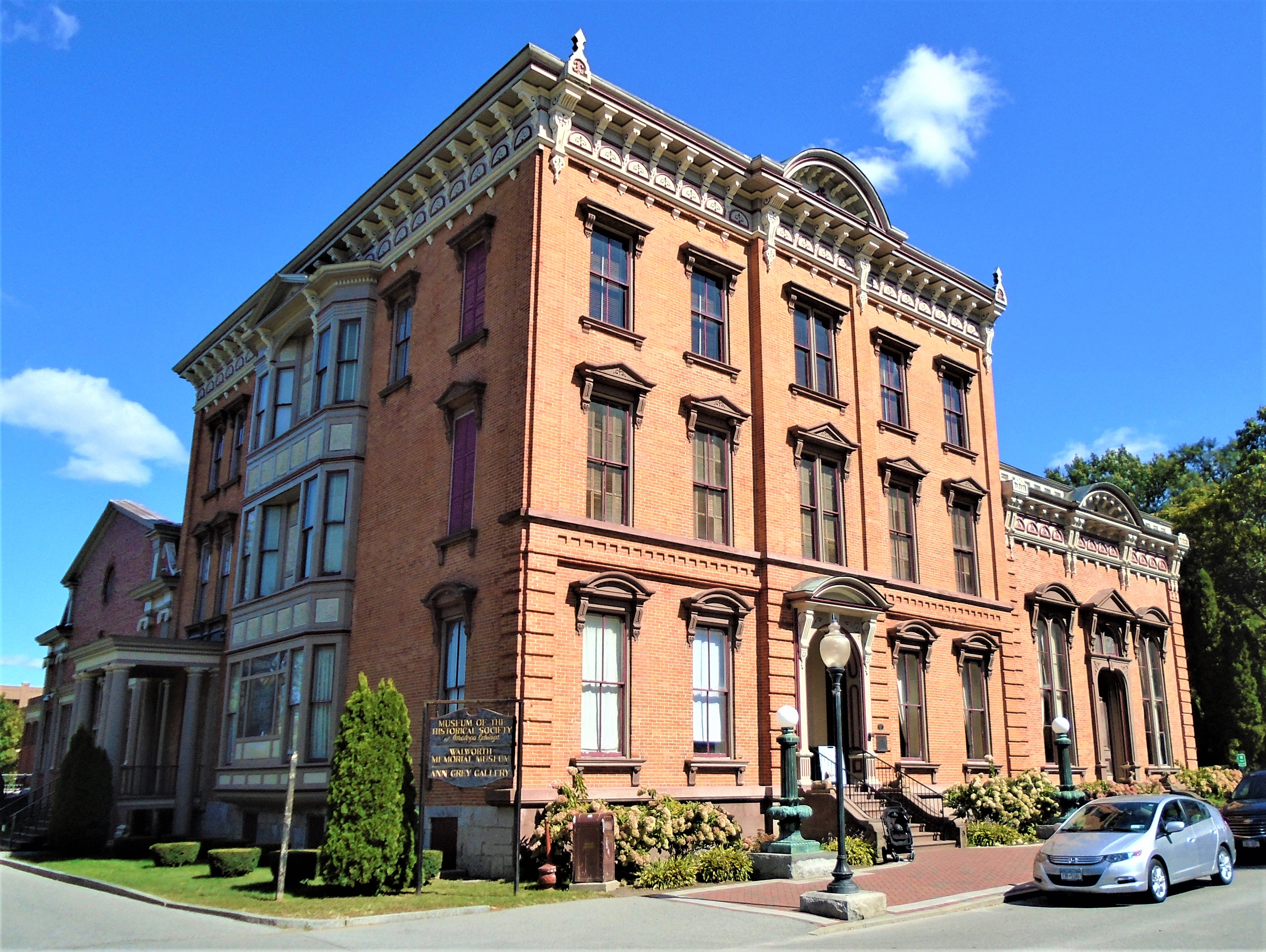
- Canfield Casino main building (left) and east wing (right), with kitchen and dining wing (left background) (2020)

- Location within New York Location within the United States
- Location: 1 Congress Street; Saratoga Springs, New York
- Coordinates: 43°4′44.68″N 73°46′56.28″W
- Area: 17 acres (6.9 ha)
- Built: 1825
- Architectural style: Renaissance Revival
- NRHP reference No.: 72000910, 87000904

Significant dates
- Added to NRHP: June 19, 1972
- Designated NHLD: February 27, 1987

Canfield Casino and Congress Park is a 17-acre (6.9 ha) site in Saratoga Springs, New York, United States. It was formerly the site of the Congress Hotel (also called Congress Hall), a large resort hotel, and the Congress Spring Bottling Plant, as well as Canfield Casino, which together brought Saratoga Springs international fame as a health spa and gambling site. At the peak of its popularity it was a place where the wealthy, major gamblers and stars of the entertainment world mingled. The park's artwork includes a statue by Daniel Chester French and landscape design by Frederick Law Olmsted, among others.

The site was listed on the National Register of Historic Places (NRHP) as the Casino-Congress Park-Circular Street Historic District in 1972, and was then declared a National Historic Landmark in 1987. The later listing excluded some of the property outside the park and halved the overall size of the district.

Congress Park is a City of Saratoga Springs park, bounded by Broadway, Spring Street, and Circular Street. The Canfield Casino buildings, built in 1870, 1871 and 1902–03, house the Saratoga Springs History Museum, an art gallery and spaces which host public and private events. Gambling was ended by reformers in 1907.

== Geography ==
The district boundaries are curved and irregular, generally following those of the park itself. It is bordered by Spring Street on the north and Circular Street down to its intersection with Park Place. It follows the 300-foot (91 m) elevation contour line on the west, excluding some of the buildings on Broadway southwest of the park, and then joins Broadway south of Union Avenue, back to its northwest corner at Spring Street.

The original historic district included some houses on Circular and Spring Streets and Whitney Place. Their removal from it made the district about 16 acres (6.5 ha) smaller

A short, narrow street, named East Congress Street – because it extends Congress Street from Broadway – runs across the park from east to west. Stone walls set off the park from the nearby street. The section north of the road is dominated by the casino and the parkland around it, the section to the south is primarily hilly parkland.

The park is a buffer between the developed commercial areas at the south end of downtown Saratoga Springs, and the residential neighborhoods on the east and west. Many of the surrounding areas are also included in the city's other historic districts. The Broadway Historic District is just to the north, with the East and West Side districts on either side. Union Avenue is also a historic district out to the racetrack.

== Property ==
The two major historical resources on the property are the casino and the park. The former are the only surviving buildings from the resort era; the latter has many notable art objects in addition to its landscaping.

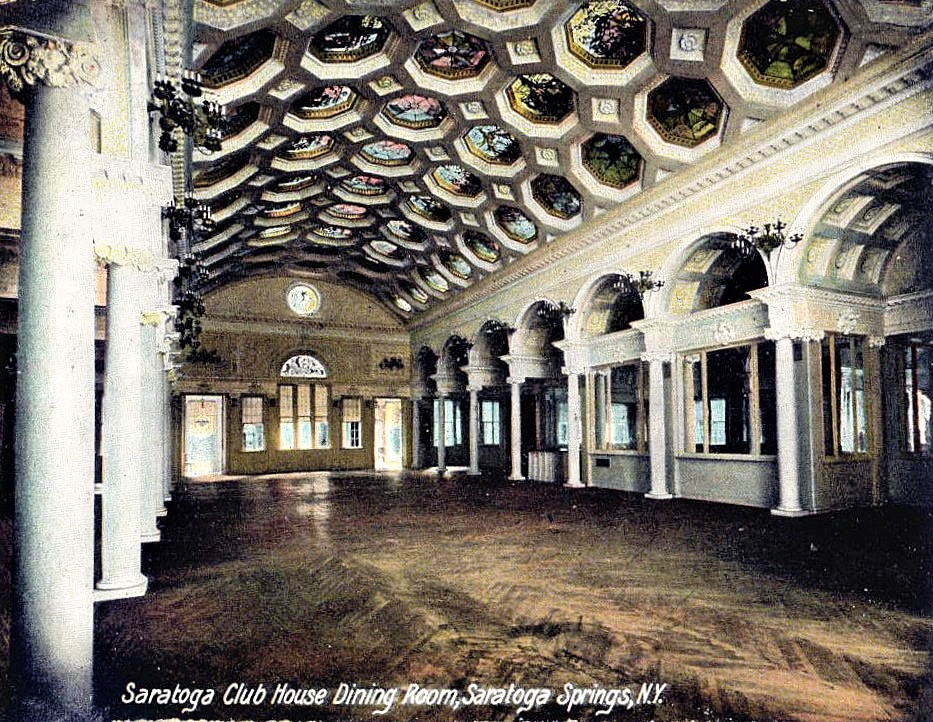
1907 postcard of dining room

=== Casino ===
The casino's main building was built in 1870; its architect is unknown. It is a three-story building faced in brick on an exposed basement, topped by a flat roof, and bordered by an ornate bracketed cornice. On the south (front) facade the brick around the doorway and at the corners is laid to look like rusticated stone. A belt course divides the first two floors.

All three stories have sandstone window trim with a different treatment — segmented pediments on the first, triangular ones on the second and rectangular on the third. A free-standing segmental pediment distinguishes the roofline on the front center as well.

Inside the main building, the entrance opens onto a central hall with staircase. The office and library are on the west. To the east the original dining room opens onto the gambling room. Private gambling rooms were upstairs, and living quarters on the third floor.

The east wing, built in 1871, used for gambling when the casino was constructed, is a two-story, three-by-five-bay structure with front windows one and a half stories high. It has a similar window treatment to the first story of the main block, and a more elaborate cornice, also with central segmented pediment. The gambling room has many of its original interior details, including mirrors and statuettes.

To the north is the dining room and kitchen wing – built in 1902-1903 and designed by Clarence Luce – a 93-by-58-foot (28 by 18 m) steel frame brick structure. At either end are stained glass windows depicting horses in different historical periods. The dining room roof is of riveted arches supported on columns. Its barrel vaulting has octagonal coffers. The parquet flooring is original, and the early air conditioning system of wall vents and the open coffer windows still works.

From 1959 until into the first decade of the 21st century Cornelius Vanderbilt Whitney and Marylou Whitney, and then after the former's death, Marylou hosted a racing season opening gala at the casino which was often over the top and known for Marylou's grand entrances.

=== Park ===
Congress Park
- Interactive map of Congress Park
- Type: Public park
- Location: Saratoga Springs, New York
- Area: 17 acres (6.9 ha)
- Created: 1913
- Operator: City of Saratoga Springs
- Open: Year round

The basin-shaped park contains Grecian pavilions around the various springs, Italian gardens, groves of trees and lawns. A Doric columned pavilion has been built over the site of the original Congress Spring, with water piped in from another spring. To its west is the Columbian Spring tapped by Gideon Putnam, the founder of Saratoga Springs, restored in 1983 and topped with a similarly Greek-inspired domed pavilion. The Congress 3 spring to the south was bottled and distributed worldwide in the 19th century, and the Freshwater Spring is still popular with city residents.

The water from the springs has been channeled into streams and fountains. One surrounds The Spirit of Life, a statue by Daniel Chester French memorializing Spencer Trask, a great benefactor of the Saratoga area who founded the Yaddo writers' colony. It sits on the south side of the large lagoon in the park. Two vases, Night and Day, by Danish sculptor Bertel Thorvaldsen, are positioned on the lawn in front of the casino.

On the north side of the park, just inside the entrance off the intersection of Spring and Putnam streets, is a carousel which has roots extending back to Coney Island, where its 28 horses were carved in 1904 by Marcus Charles Illions, a Lithuanian-born woodcarver considered to be the "Master Carer" of the carousel world. The carousel was originally installed in Kaydeross Amusement Park on Saratoga Lake in 1910. In 1987 the park was being sold for development, with the carousel being intended to be sold at auction, however local volunteers raised the money to purchase it. After restoration, the carousel was opened to the public in 2002. It is one of only 6 carousels carved by Illions remaining in the world, and the only double-row carousel. It is open from the beginning of May through Columbus Day each year, and for special events. The carousel is in need of restoration, and a campaign has been started to raise the necessary funds.

== History ==
Congress Spring was named in 1792 when it was visited by a group that included two members of the newly established U.S. Congress. A decade later, in 1803, an entrepreneur named Gideon Putnam bought the acre (2,000 m^{2}) around the spring and built a hotel for guests, the Congress Hotel or Congress Hall, in what was still a largely unsettled frontier. Two years later he bought the 130 acres (53 ha) around the original acre and laid out plans for the town of Saratoga Springs.

This led to two enlargements of the hotel. He died in 1812 while yet another was underway. The new town competed with nearby Ballston Spa and other spa towns in Pennsylvania and Virginia for visitors. It was at an early disadvantage since one of the first temperance societies in the country had been established in Saratoga Springs, and not only alcohol but gambling and dancing were at first forbidden in the town.

Those bans were gradually relaxed to attract more resort business, and by 1820 were effectively repealed. John Clarke, who had run the first soda fountain in New York City, moved to Saratoga a few years afterwards and bought the spring property. He began to bottle and sell Saratoga water, promoting the iodine he had discovered in the water as a curative. This success allowed him to improve the site and create the crescent-shaped lawn, as well as drain some of the swampy areas.

John Morrissey, who opened the Saratoga Race Course, ca. 1860

By the middle of the century the city and the hotel were one of the country's most popular resorts, due to its railroad access. It lost some business during the Civil War when its Southern clientele could not visit, but during that time former heavyweight boxing champion John Morrissey opened the Saratoga Race Course, giving the city another major tourist attraction. He also began the Saratoga Clubhouse, which would later become the Canfield Casino, after the war, in 1866.

In 1866, Morrissey was elected to Congress as a Democrat who was part of New York City's Tammany Hall political machine. He was well-connected, acquainted with tycoons of the era like Jay Gould, William R. Travers and Commodore Cornelius Vanderbilt, who were among his partners in the hotel and racetrack. They gave both a reputation for wealthy and fashionable guests that it continued to enjoy long afterwards. In 1876, Morrissey got Frederick Law Olmsted and Jacob Weidenmann to do some landscaping on the park.

After Morrissey's death in 1878, ownership passed to Albert Spencer and Charles Reed. In 1893, Richard Albert Canfield took a partnership in the Saratoga Clubhouse, and bought it outright in 1894 for $250,000. ^nventory Nomination Form Canfield invested an estimated $800,000 in enhancing the building and the grounds of Congress Park to bring them up to the standards of the top European establishments. In 1902-3, he added a sumptuous dining room to the back of the Clubhouse fitting it with stained glass windows and an early form of air conditioning. He ordered marble statuary for the Italian gardens in the northeast corner of Congress Park. The elegant atmosphere made the cream of society feel welcome to bet their money on the Clubhouses's many games of chance. Canfield was recognized as the King of the Gamblers and Saratoga Springs was seen as the American Monte Carlo. Canfield kept the Clubhouse going until 1907. The clientele during this period included not only members of wealthy families like the Whitneys, Vanderbilts and J. P. Morgan's, but gambling legends like Diamond Jim Brady and John Warne "Bet-a-Million" Gates, and prominent entertainers like Gate's girlfriend Lillian Russell and impresario Florenz Ziegfeld.

This socially distinctive era, regarded as the city's golden age, ended in 1907 when reformers succeeded in banning gambling in the city. Canfield retired and sold the hotel and grounds to the city four years later, in 1911. The Pure Food and Drug Act hurt sales of bottled Saratoga Water, and the year after buying from Canfield, the city bought the Congress Hall hotel and bottling plant and demolished them.

In 1912, the city bought Congress Spring Park and tore down the Congress Hotel and the Congress Spring Bottling Plant. Their sites would later host a public library – built in 1949 and expanded in 1967, now the headquarters of Saratoga Arts – and the Trask Memorial Fountain. The park and the grounds of the casino were combined into Congress Park in 1913. In 1914, Henry Bacon and Charles Leavitt were engaged to do further work on the park's landscaping.

== Gallery ==
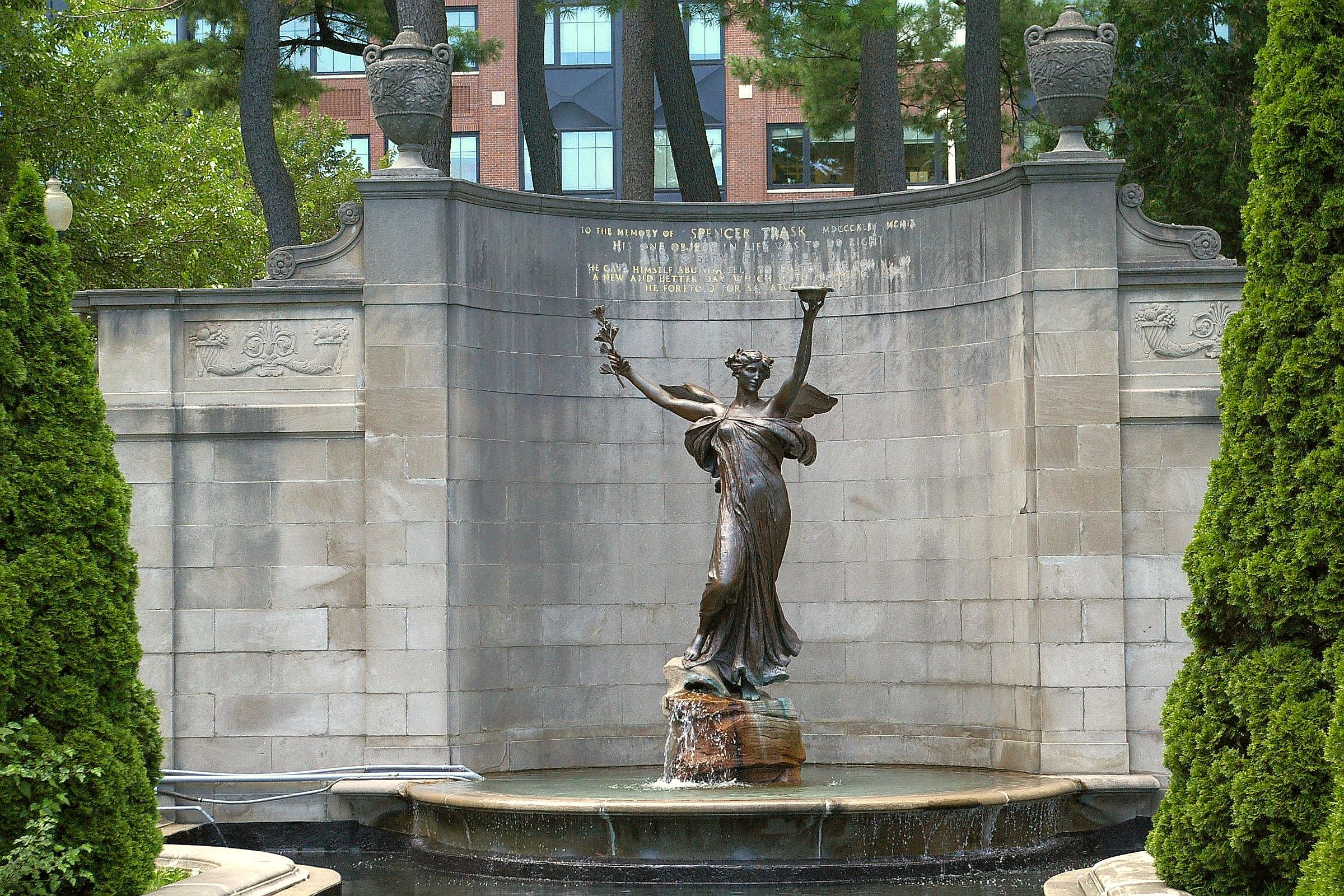
The Spirit of Life (1914) by Daniel Chester French is part of the Trask Memorial Fountain

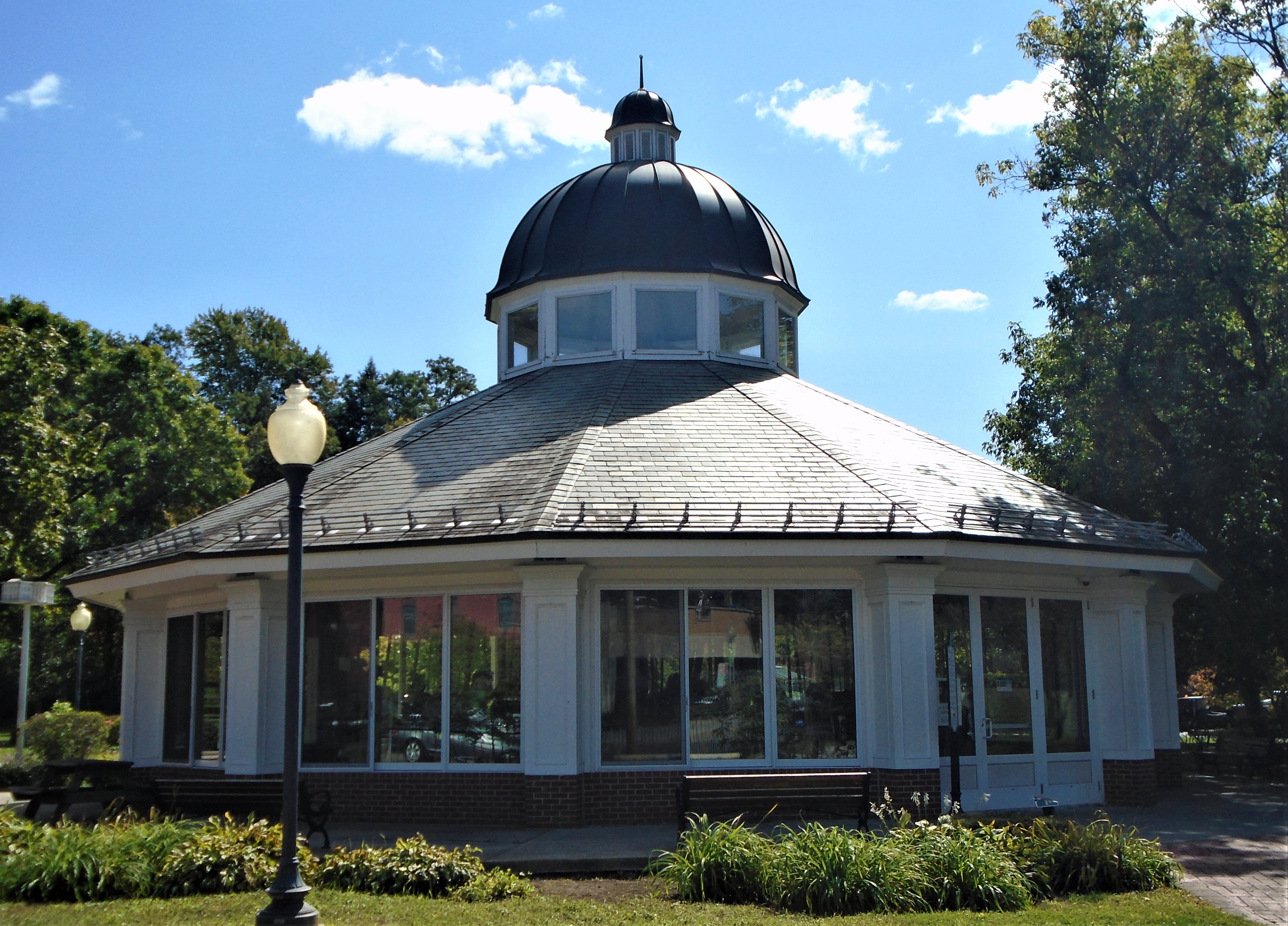
The Carousel in Congress Park was moved from Kaydeross Park on Saratoga Lake and re-opened in 2002

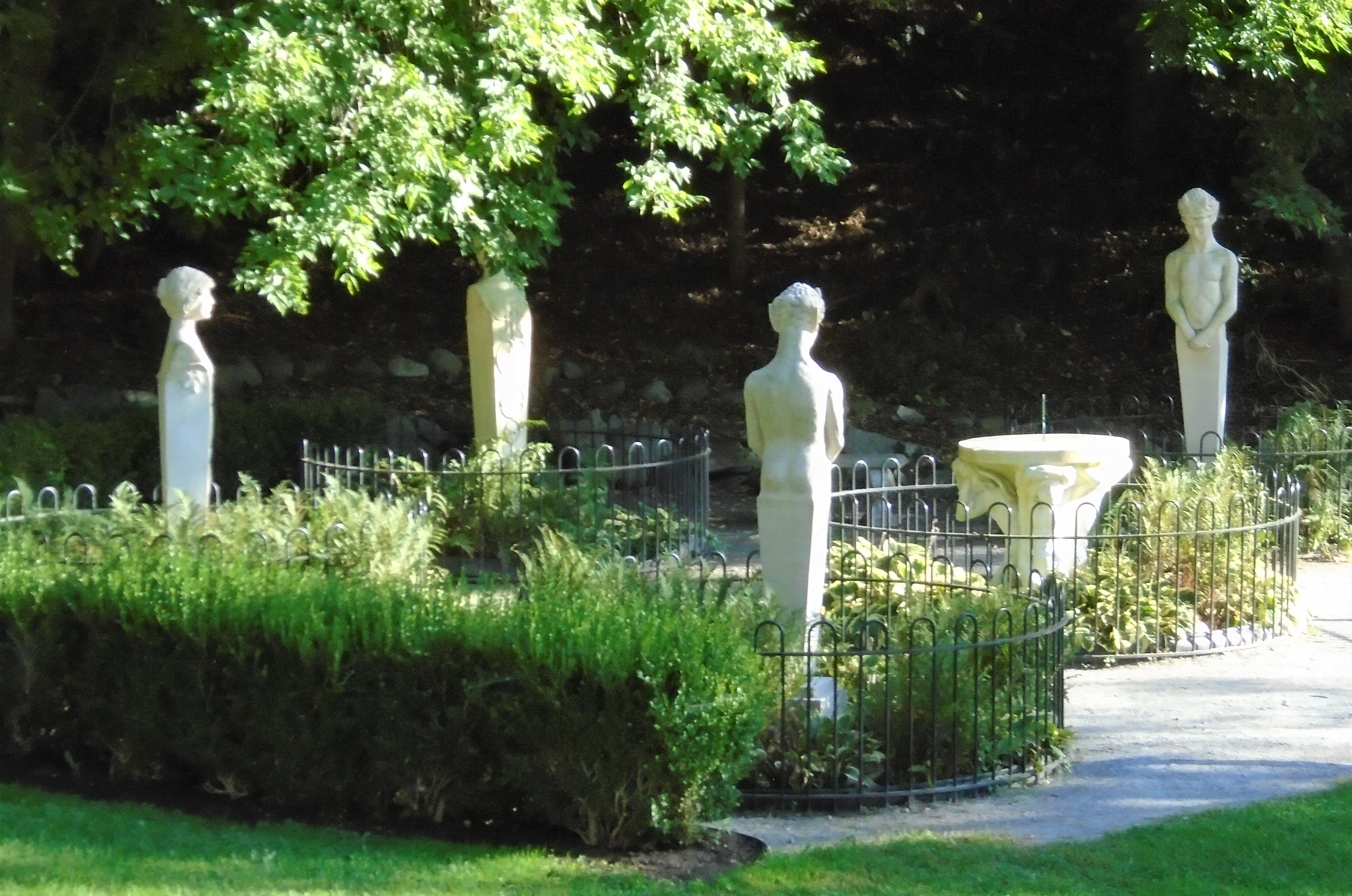
The Palladian Circle, featuring statues of satyrs and Maenads around a sundial, is part of the Italian Gardens

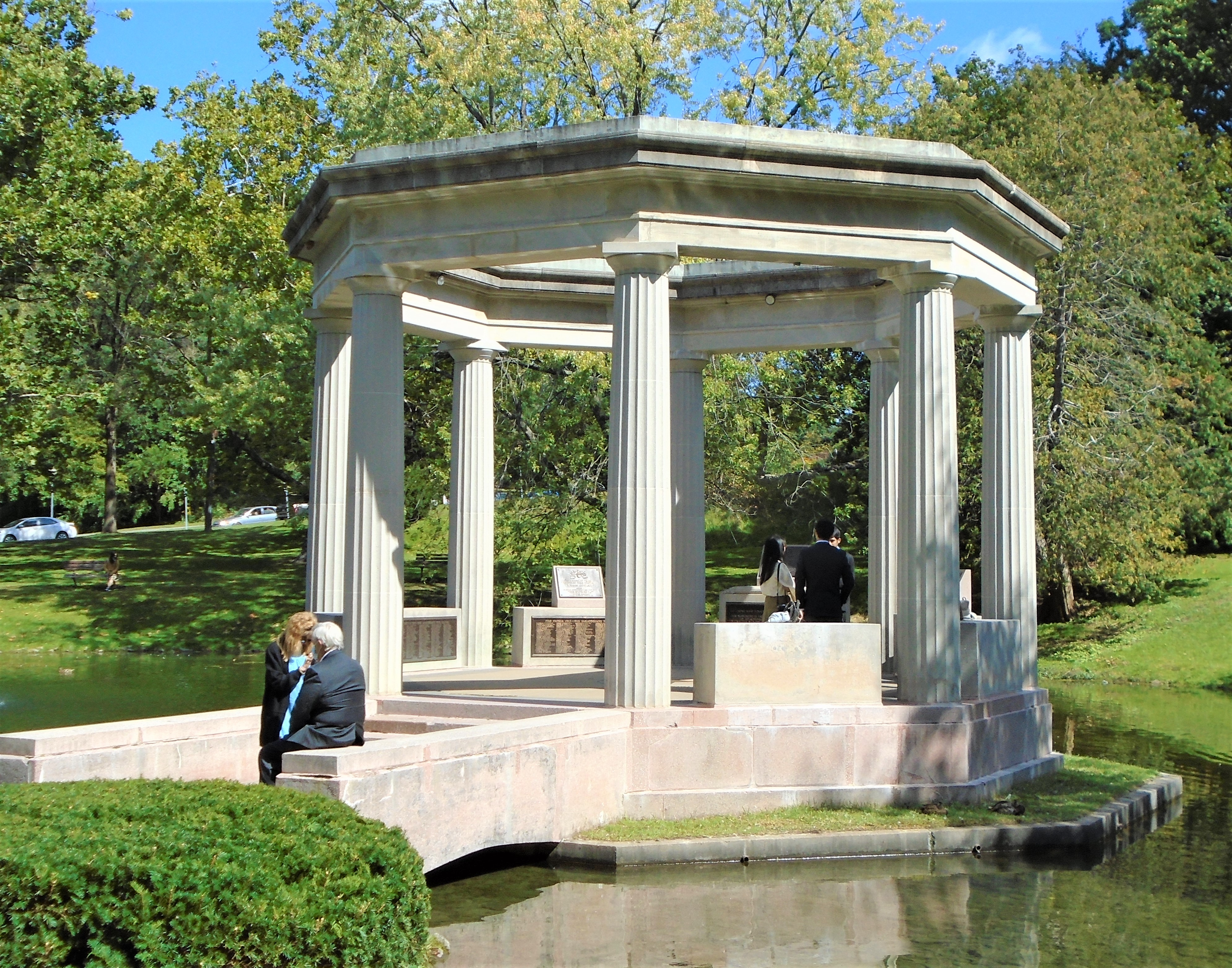
The World War Memorial Pavilion was dedicated in 1931

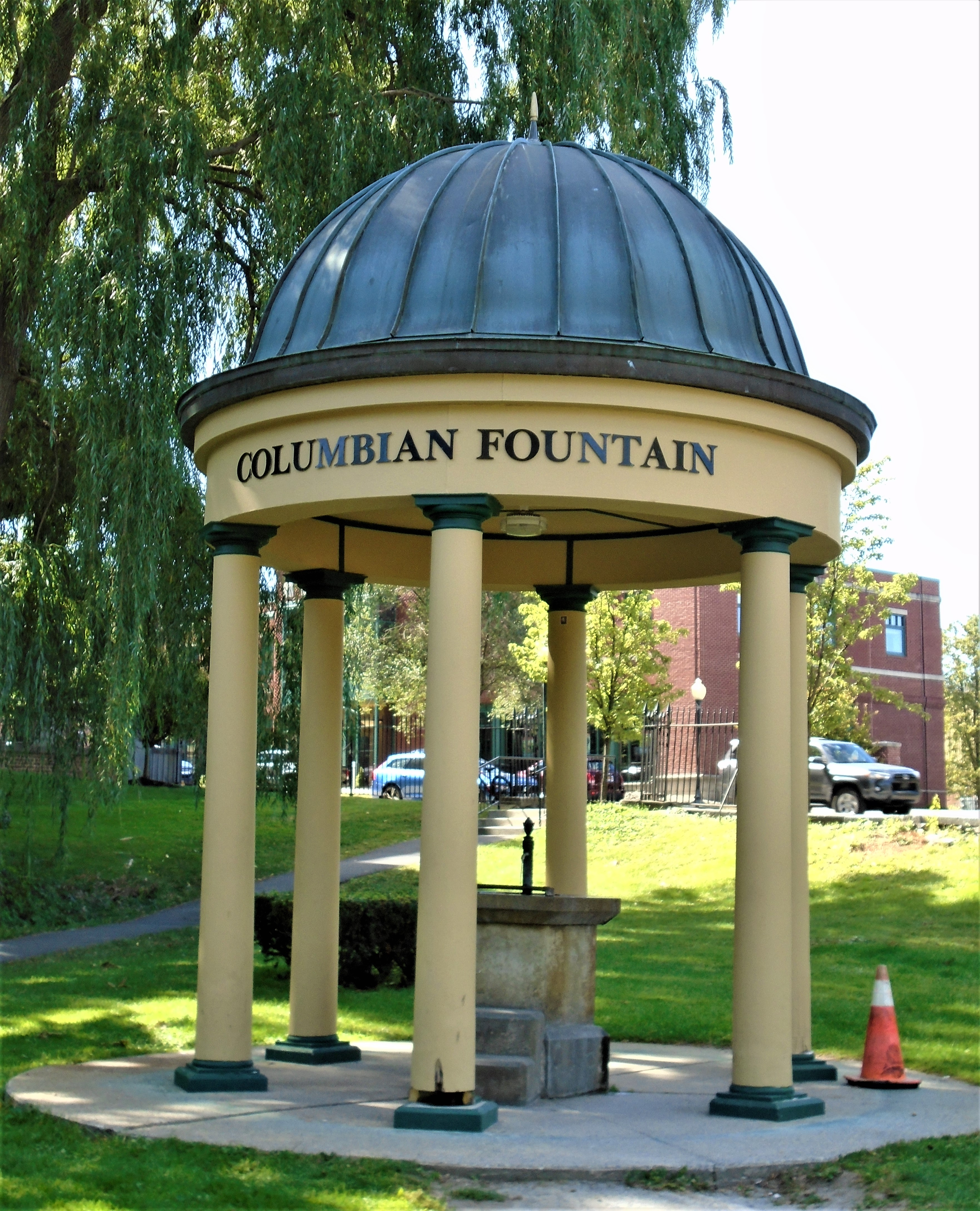
The Columbian Fountain's domed pavilion is a modern reproduction

== See also ==
- List of National Historic Landmarks in New York
- National Register of Historic Places listings in Saratoga County, New York
- Broadway Historic District (Saratoga Springs, New York)
- East Side Historic District (Saratoga Springs, New York)
- Union Avenue Historic District (Saratoga Springs, New York)
- West Side Historic District (Saratoga Springs, New York)
