= Union Avenue Historic District (Saratoga Springs, New York) =

Historic district in New York, United States

- U.S. National Register of Historic Places
- U.S. Historic district
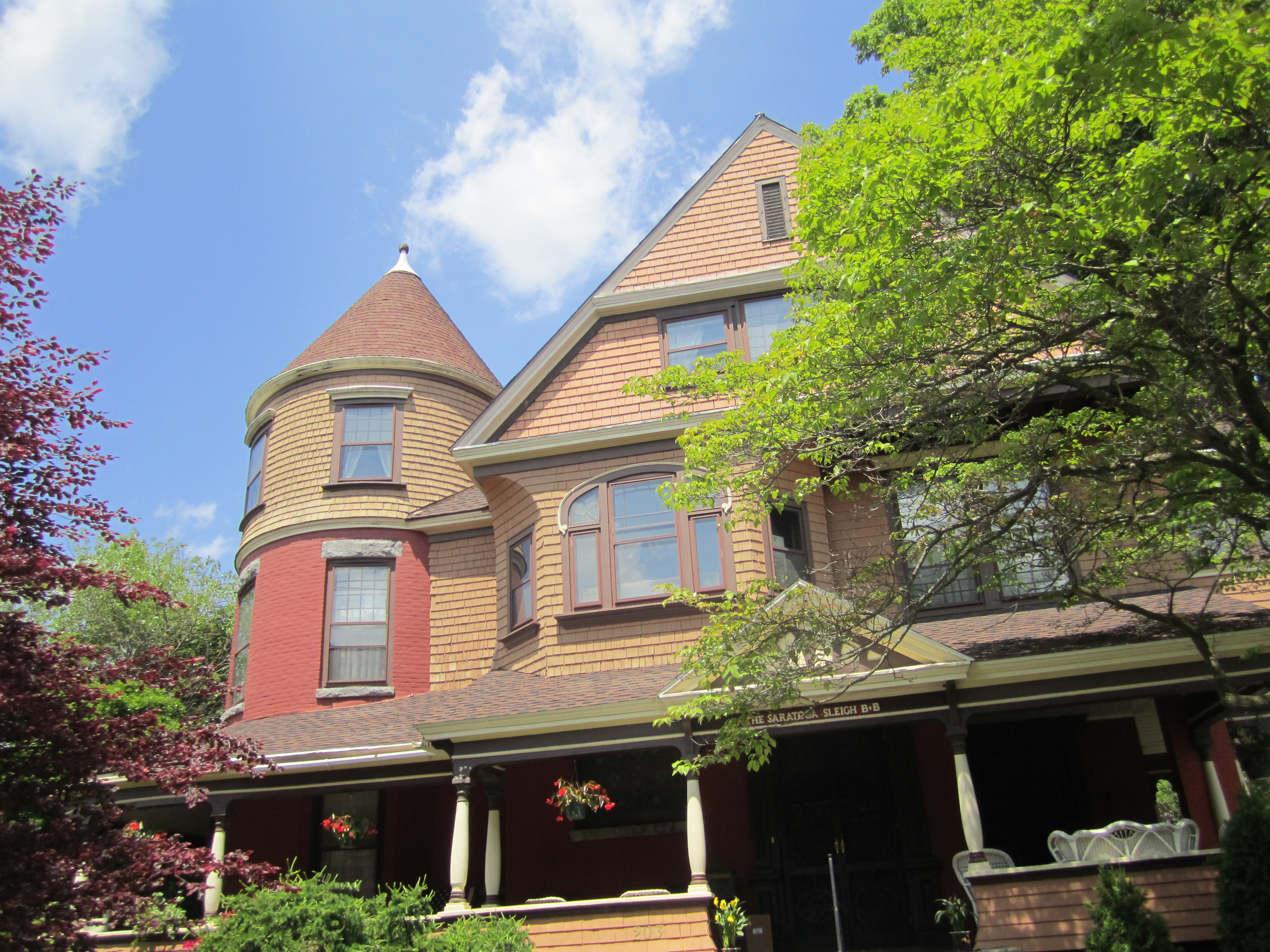
- 203 Union Ave, a Queen Anne style home and contributing property

- Location within New York Location within the United States
- Location: Union Ave., Saratoga Springs, New York
- Coordinates: 43°4′16″N 73°45′56″W
- Built: 1863
- Architect: Multiple
- Architectural style: Colonial Revival, Gothic, Queen Anne
- NRHP reference No.: 78001906
- Added to NRHP: April 04, 1978

Union Avenue Historic District is a historic district in Saratoga Springs, New York. It was listed on the U.S. National Register of Historic Places in 1978.

It includes at least the Congress Park portion of the Canfield Casino and Congress Park, a U.S. National Historic Landmark District. Union Avenue, which is part of New York State Route 9P, includes a number of stately Victorian homes built in the second half of the nineteenth and early twentieth centuries, as well as buildings owned by Empire State College, some of which were once Skidmore College Buildings. Both the Saratoga Race Course and Yaddo are located on Union Avenue.

== See also ==
- National Register of Historic Places listings in Saratoga County, New York
- Broadway Historic District (Saratoga Springs, New York)
- Casino-Congress Park-Circular Street Historic District.
- East Side Historic District (Saratoga Springs, New York)
- West Side Historic District (Saratoga Springs, New York)
