= Bethesda Episcopal Church (Saratoga Springs) =

Historic church in New York, United States

Coordinates: 43°4′47.5″N 73°47′15″W

Bethesda Episcopal Church Saratoga Springs, New York
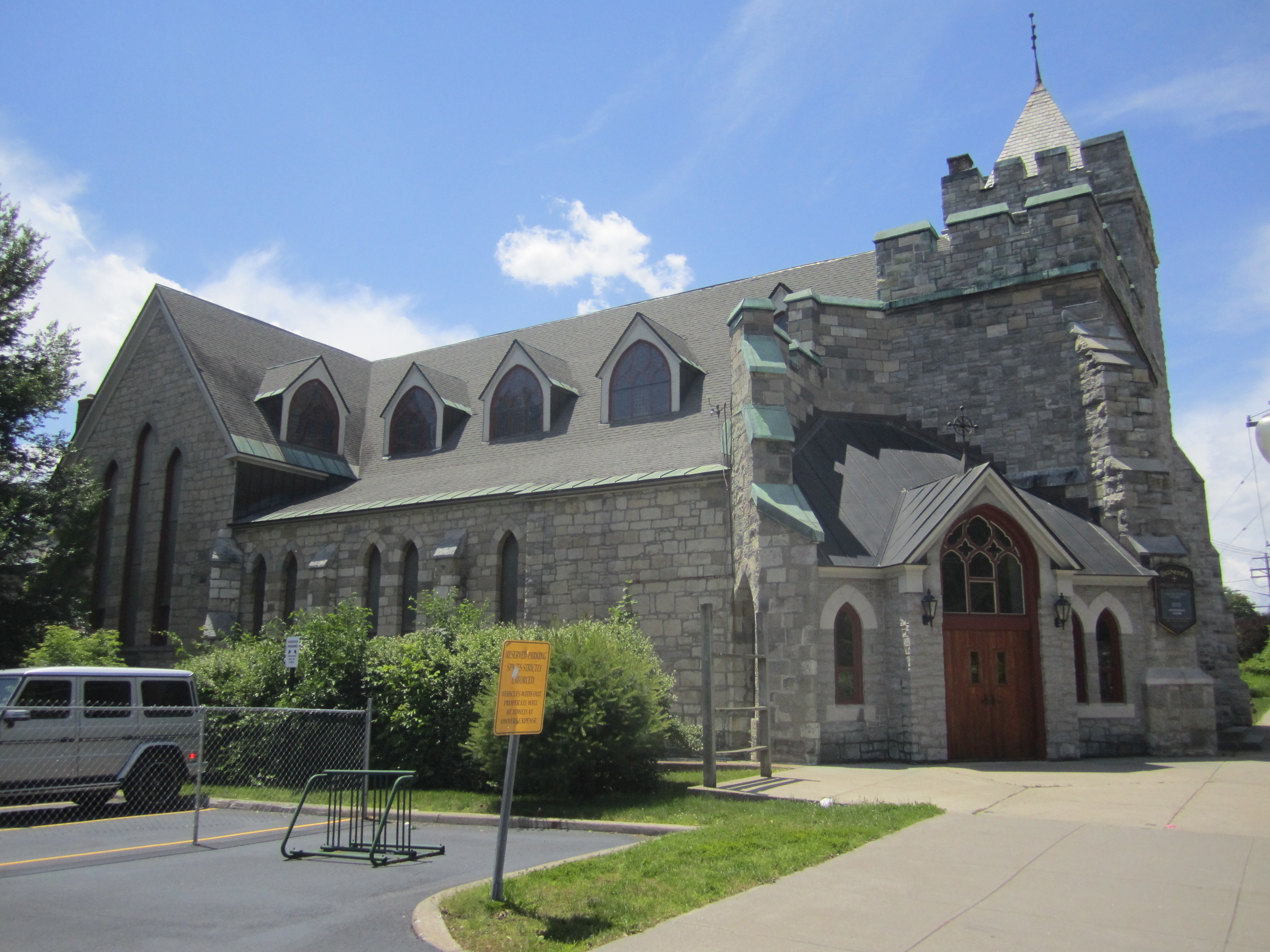
- Bethesda Episcopal Church in 2013
- Bethesda Episcopal Church; Saratoga Springs, New York
- Denomination: Episcopal
- Website: bethesdachurch.org

Administration
- Province: Two
- Diocese: Episcopal Diocese of Albany
- Parish: Bethesda

Bethesda Episcopal Church is an Episcopal Church in Saratoga Springs, New York.

The parish was incorporated in 1830, and in 1841 it purchased the site of its present church at 26 Washington Street. Architect Richard Upjohn drew up plans for the church in English Gothic style, and construction began in 1842.

The first services were held in the building in 1844, and side aisles were added in 1856. In 1886, Mrs. Rockwell Putnam, widow of the owner of the Grand Union Hotel in Saratoga Springs, donated money for construction of a tower in memory of her late husband. Architect A. Page Brown designed the additions in Norman Romanesque style, and the work was completed in 1887. A notable feature of the renovation was the addition of Tiffany windows in the front facade.

The church is listed in the National Register of Historic Places as a contributing property of the Broadway Historic District in Saratoga Springs.

== See also ==
- National Register of Historic Places listings in Saratoga County, New York
