= Anne Diggory =

American painter

Anne Diggory (b.1951) is an American artist.

Diggory received a BA from Yale University in 1973, and an MFA from Indiana University in 1976. In 1977 she moved to Saratoga Springs, New York and began work inspired by local landscapes including the Adirondack Park and Saratoga Springs.

In 2001 The New York Times chronicled a painting and backpacking trip to the Adirondacks by Ms. Diggory and others.

== Work ==
In addition to numerous smaller paintings, she has executed multiple large-scale pieces, including murals for the Adirondack Trust Company, Five Seasons of the Adirondacks in 1998 and The Flume in 2001, and a frieze (with Alice Manzi and Beverly Mastrianni) for the facade of the Saratoga Springs Amtrak Station in 2003.

Her painting Layers of Clarity and Ambiguity was featured in the October, 2001 issue of American Artist magazine.
