= Henry Walton =

Henry Walton may refer to:

- Henry Walton (politician) (died 1896), New Zealand farmer and politician
- Henry Walton (judge) (1768–1844), prominent citizen of Saratoga Springs, New York
- Henry Walton (English painter) (1746–1813), English painter and art dealer
- Henry Walton (American painter) (1804–1865), American artist active in Ithaca, New York
- Henry F. Walton (1858–1921), American politician from Pennsylvania

== See also ==
- George Henry Walton (1867–1933), Scottish architect and designer
- Harry Walton (disambiguation)
