= Grand Union Hotel (Saratoga Springs, New York) =

Hotel in Saratoga Springs, New York, United States

Coordinates: 43°4′46.2″N 73°47′10.62″W

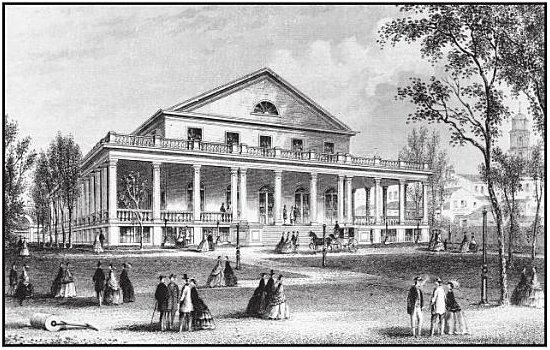
Opera House at the Grand Union Hotel, Saratoga Springs, 1865

The Grand Union Hotel was located on Broadway in Saratoga Springs, New York. The hotel began as a boarding house, built by Gideon Putnam in 1802, but grew into the world's largest hotel, before it was demolished in 1953.

The initial draw to the area were summer vacationers attracted by the mineral spas. Over time this became a luxury hotel that catered to the wealthy elite. Renovations and expansions saw the hotel grow to serve over 2,000 guests as a destination resort. The Grand Union Hotel Stakes race was run at the Saratoga race track until 1958 and was named after this historic hotel.

== Gideon & Doanda Putnam years (1802–1836) ==
The Grand Union Hotel, built by city founder Gideon Putnam, began as Putnam's Tavern and Boarding House in 1802. The original building would not have been considered a true hotel, because the concept of a modern hotel was invented by American architect Isaiah Rogers decades later in 1823. (Note: Rogers first introduced in his Tremont House, Boston Massachusetts in 1823 and widely publicized by William Harvard Eliot in A Description of Tremont House, with Architectural Illustrations, Boston, Gray and Bowen, 1830. Roger’s hotel, and Eliot’s book about it, transformed the whole concept of travel accommodations throughout the world. A hotel was to be something like a public palace, great in scale with palatial interior spaces, especially a grand dining room and ballroom. After the publication of this book, Union Hall was upgraded to conform to this new ideal)

Putnam bought a one-acre building site adjacent to Congress Spring from Judge Walton. The boarding house was finished in 1803. The building was a mortise and tenon clapboard structure that was described as two Federal style houses placed end to end. It had 10 windows across the front, whitewashed exterior, and dark shutters. The structure was 70 feet long, three stories high, and had 70 guestrooms. The original structure most likely contained small private guestrooms, the Putnam's living spaces, and probably a few formal parlors. A large porch was added in 1822, and Gideon's wife, Doanda Putnam, painted a sign for Putnam's Tavern depicting Israel Putnam's famous eradication of the last wolf in Connecticut (Note: The painting shows “Israel Putnam, hero of the American Revolution, leaning into a cave and grasping the wolf by the jaws. A black servant stands nearby with a musket, with two neighbors nearby.”)

During the hotel's early days, it was probably open only during the summer. This was common practice in upstate New York; the similar Sans Souci and Aldridge House hotels in Ballston Spa were also only open in the summertime. The mineral springs, which were purported to have great health effects, were the main attraction for this region and were typically visited only in the summer. Ballston Spa was the original vacation destination, and Putnam hoped to tap into the tourist trade by opening his hotel close to the mineral springs. The first summer that the boarding house was open, it was filled to capacity with 70 guests and was a huge success.

During Putnam's lifetime the building was expanded to over twice its original size. Following Gideon Putam's death in 1812, Doanda oversaw the running over the boarding house until 1836. The name of the boarding house was changed to Union Hall sometime prior to Doanda's death.

== Rockwell and Washington Putnam years (1836–1864) ==
In 1836, following their mother's death, Rockwell and Washington Putnam bought their brothers’ and sisters’ interest in the Union Hall and ran the establishment from 1836–1864.

The hotel itself constantly expanded. It retained a “U” shape for most of its existence, with one large section of building fronting Broadway and two large wings extending down the side streets. The entire first floor of the hotel would have been used as public space.

In an advertisement dated 1843, the Union Hall was described as having 400 feet of frontage on Broadway and included “spacious saloons, dining halls, and piazzas, and also the delightful garden and pleasure grounds.” These covered about four acres of land. Congress Spring was about 200 feet to the west of the building. This 1846 advertisement claimed that the building “has again undergone thorough repair, been repainted and otherwise renovated, and an addition of 70 feet has been made to the dining hall, so that it is now capable of seating 450 persons.” The dining hall was over 200 feet in length.

Whether they were original to the complex or later additions, by 1860 Union Hall had a great number of out-buildings, including sundry barns and stables.

The hotel had been renovated to include at least four floors by the 1860s and contained two formal parlors. The piazza out front was three stories high. The main entrance and office was at the center of the Broadway front, in a rotunda, which was 80 feet in diameter and extended to the top of the building, with balconies on each of the five stories overlooking the entrance and grand saloon. To the left of the office were reception rooms and a grand saloon parlor. Beyond the drawing room were smaller private parlors. On the Congress Street wing was the dining hall, which was expanded several times. The dining hall had frescoes and was furnished with mirrors.

The rooms of the hotel were furnished with hand-made, elegant furnishings. There were several suites for family use.

Summertime at Union Hall was meant to be an event of epic proportions. The dining hall had elaborate meals every day, “it is like attending a dinner party every day, and a full-dress party every night.” There was frequently dancing in the ballroom following dinner, especially on weekends. The elite came to stay at Union Hall, including millionaires, governors, senators, congressmen, judges, presidents, literary figures, and many others. Dinner menus at the Union Hall (1854) included Vermicilli for soup, for fish baked bass with port wine sauce, boiled leg of mutton, corned beef, chicken with pork, beef a la mode, Phipps ham, beef and tongues. Roasts were beef, veal, saddle of mutton, turkey, saddle of lamp, venison with currant jelly, ducks. Entrees included chicken pie French style, mutton with vegetables, rice croquettes flavored with wine, Ficandeau of veal, tomato sauce, breaded lamp chops, broiled pigeons, a la Americans, stewed mutton with potatoes, casserole de Ris a la Finacore, macaroni Italian style. Pastries included pineapple pie, apple pie, charlotte russe a la vanilla, and deserts were raisins, almonds, walnuts, nuts, nutmeg, melons, oranges, apples, and watermelons.

In the 1840s, the United States hotel was built by Elias Benedict. For many years, Union Hall and Congress Hall were the most spectacular hotels in Saratoga Springs. When the United States Hotel was built, it passed the Union Hotel in prestige and beauty. The hotel industry was incredibly competitive, and there became a constant need to make improvements, enlargements, and more ornate decorations to the hotels in order to remain competitive in the market and to draw the richest, most elite clientele.

== Leland Brothers years (1864–1872) ==
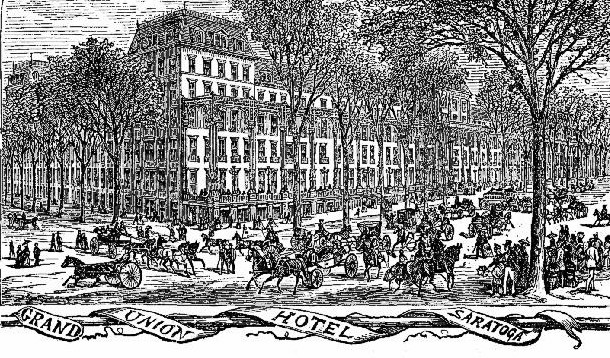
The Grand Union Hotel c. 1870

Warren Leland, Charles Leland, George E. Leland, and Lewis Leland bought the hotel in 1864. During this period of time, the Grand Union Hotel reached the pinnacle of its popularity and fame. The Leland brothers were already well-known hotel proprietors and also owned additional hotels in the area, such as Montgomery Hall. Under the direction of the Leland brothers, the hotel saw constant improvements and enlargements in order to respond to the growing competition in the hotel industry. The hotel grew to four stories with incredibly ornate interiors.

The Leland brothers changed the hotel's name to Union Hall (1864) and then the Grand Union Hotel (1869).

The exterior of the hotel morphed until it reflected the Second Empire architectural style. This style was reflected in the ornate mansard roofs with slate shingles (added in 1870), cornices at the tops of the roofs and brackets under the eaves. There were four large rectangular towers with one being larger than the others by one floor and rotunda on the top. All four towers had dormer windows on the top floor and flags flying high on the tops of each tower. There were classical columns along the piazza. The ornamentation was designed to make the structure appear huge, imposing, and expensive.

The Leland brothers’ first order of business was to erect a 1,600 seat opera house on the grounds of the Union Hotel, near Federal Street. The Opera House opened on July 4, 1865, and General Ulysses S. Grant, hero of the Civil War and subsequently President of the United States was present for the opening. On either side of the Opera House were erected what were called “cottages,” which were like private houses clustered together and provided private and spacious accommodations for the very wealthy.

The dining room was one of the focal points of the hotel's design. The hall was expanded several times until it was able to seat 1000 people, the tables placed across the room at intervals of five feet and a 10-foot passageway down the middle of the room. The dining room was expanded after the Civil War years to serve up to 1,400 people at a time.

A billiards room and reading-rooms were added in later expansions. There was a wine storage room purported to be worth $50,000.

In an advertisement in 1871, the Leland brothers write “This establishment is by far the largest and most complete hotel in the world, and with its various buildings, cottages, lawns, groves, and promenades, occupies seven acres of land comprising nearly an entire block of the town…four hundred large and airy rooms on the first and second floors, all rendered easy of access by Atwood’s vertical railway. Many of these in suites for the accommodation of families and several detached cottages, built and furnished expressly for family accommodations. Each cottage contains eight airy pleasant rooms with bath and closet. The banqueting room, an important feature of this establishment, has ample and sumptuous accommodations for 1,200. its enormous size—240 feet by 60, ceilings 25 feet high, lighted by 40 large windows and detached from the culinary department renders this superb apartment airy and pleasant at all times.”

During this area, private baths were unheard of except for the extremely wealthy, and the Grand Union offered spacious bath houses with hot and cold showers, plunge and swimming baths.

Concerts were held every morning on the piazzas of the Grand Union from 1865 on. Evenings were reserved for hops, afternoons for garden parties. Once a week there were children's garden parties.

The Canfield Casino (“Morrissey’s Club House”) was built in 1862 by John Morrissey and the Saratoga Race Course opened in 1864. The two gambling locations were received with explosive fame, and attendance to Saratoga Springs and to the Grand Union Hotel increased exponentially.

The additions on the building proved too expensive for the Leland brothers, and they declared bankruptcy on February 28, 1872.

== A. T. Stewart years (1872–1876) ==
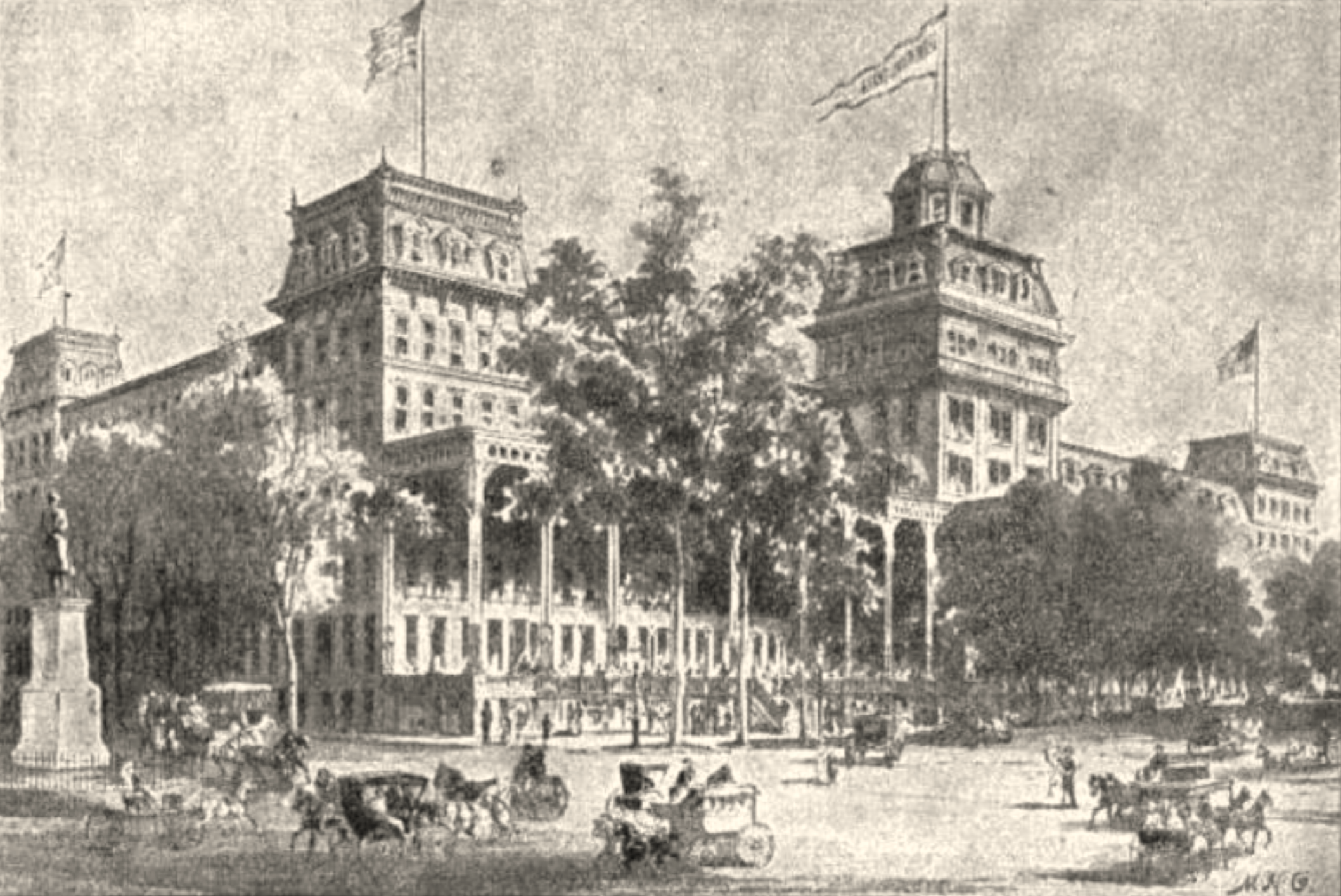
Sketch of the Grand Union Hotel in Saratoga Springs

Alexander Turney Stewart bought Union Hall from the bankrupt Leland brothers for $532,000 on March 13, 1872 and immediately began adding on. Keeping with tradition the hotel catered to the tourist trade, opening around the first of May and closing around the first of October.

Under Stewart's ownership the hotel's frontage was 1400 feet, 450 on Broadway. A rear interior piazza was added in 1876, described in an advertisement a year later "18 feet in width, three stories in height, 1250 feet in length." The whole interior was remodeled, and the 4-acre garden renovated.

The second major change in 1876 was the addition of an ornate 60 x 85 foot white and gold ballroom where the Opera House used to be. Three huge partially electric crystal chandeliers, banners, and flags hung from the ceiling. Over a white pine floor hung an allegorical painting by Adolphe Yvon, The Genius of America, weighing 600 pounds.

Napier Lothian conducted the Boston Symphony Orchestra at the Grand Union Hotel for many years, from 1880 through the 1890s. The Concerts were given every morning on the piazzas of the hotel and hops on occasional evenings in the ballroom. Entertainment for children was held every week.

The guestrooms were expanded to accommodate 2000 guests. The dining room is listed as 55 × 280 feet and could accommodate 1200 guests, and the ballroom at 60×85 feet. There are listed bowling alleys and billiard rooms, as well as private dining and supper rooms. Elevators were installed by 1872, possibly earlier.

By 1877 there was indoor plumbing, with "ice-cold spring of pure and delicious fresh water, connected by underground pipes, whereby a constant and abundant supply, both hot and cold, is furnished in every room of the hotel."

By 1876 the Grand Union Hotel could claim the title as the world's largest hotel.

Society's elite stayed in Saratoga Springs during the summertime, and the Hotel sought to attract the most wealthy to it. There is at least one account of Commodore Cornelius Vanderbilt and his friend William Wilson Corcoran dining at the Grand Union in August 1866.

The famous actress Lillian Russell first appeared in Saratoga with railroad tycoon Diamond Jim Brady on her arm in 1882. Her appearances continued beyond 1900. She often traveled down Broadway in her Victorian carriage and two matching thoroughbreds, or shocked observers by riding a gold-plated bicycle with handlebars bearing her initials spelled out in diamonds and emeralds.

In 1877, Henry Hilton, the manager of the hotel and executor of Stewart's will, denied entry to Jewish Joseph Seligman and his family, creating nationwide controversy. It was the first antisemitic incident of its kind in the United States to achieve widespread publicity.

After Stewart's death in April 1876, his heirs decided that the enormous hotel was too big a burden. They first leased the building to Woolley and Gerrans in 1892, and W. Edgar Woolley ran it until 1911.

== Woolley years (1892–1911) ==
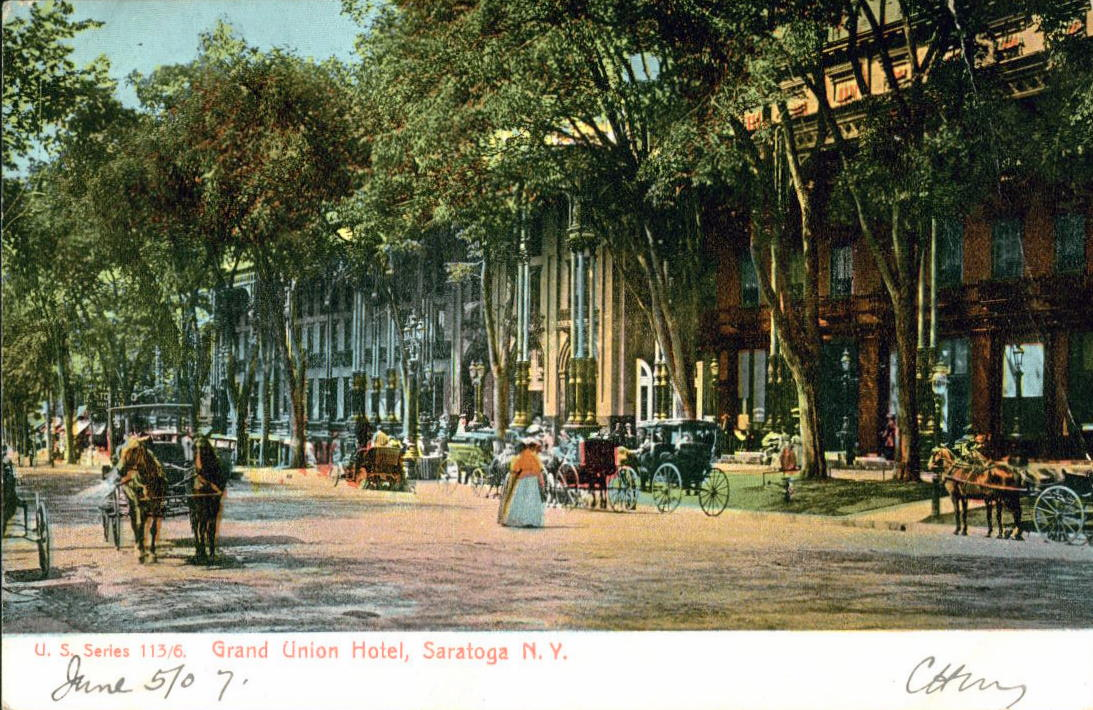
From a 1907 post card

W. Edgar Woolley was the father of Edgar Montillion "Monty" Woolley of the stage, radio and screen fame. W. Edgar Woolley leased the Grand Union Hotel during the late 1890s and into the early part of the 1900s. Woolley and Gerrans were prominent in hoteliers in New York State during this time period.

Woolley brought the famous Victor Herbert Orchestra to the Grand Union Hotel in 1892, and the orchestra continued to play through at least 1905. During these years, the hotel handled its greatest businesses due in large part to the attraction of the orchestra. The Victor Herbert Orchestra played with over 50 members and held several concerts a day on the piazza and in the ballroom. It is rumored that the famous Babes in Toyland operetta (1903) was written and performed at the Grand Union during this time.

Woolley sought to make the Grand Union Hotel a convention center. The Republican State Convention came to the hotel in 1894, 1895, 1896 and 1904. The Department of New York Grand Army of the Republic came to the hotel in June 1896, the Grand Commandery of the Knights Templar of the State of New York and the Sessions of the Appellate Division of the Supreme Court both came in 1905, the Ancient Order of Hibernians and the State Department of the Grand Army of the Republic both came in 1906. The 30th Triennial Convention of the Templar Orders of the United States came to the Grand Union on July 6, 1907 and the National Encampment of the Grand Army of the Republic came on September 9–14, 1907. Other conventions included the World's Temperance Congress and the National Hotel Men's Convention, the Grand Council Royal Arcanum, and many others.

The Grand Union also sought to cash in on the success of the regatta during this time period that was held on Saratoga Lake.

At least one crystal chandelier in the ballroom was purchased for US$20,000 (equivalent to $740,000 in 2025) in 1902.

Woolley did not renew its lease on the hotel in 1911. At least one article attributes their decline to re-lease the hotel on the ban on horse racing, which occurred in 1911. The hotel was still owned by the Stewart Estate. The legal team representing the owners planned to auction off the furnishings of the hotel and demolish the hotel, claiming that the land would be more valuable than the hotel itself. The hotel was saved from demolition by Frank Hathorn.

== Frank and Florence Hathorn years (1912-1950) ==
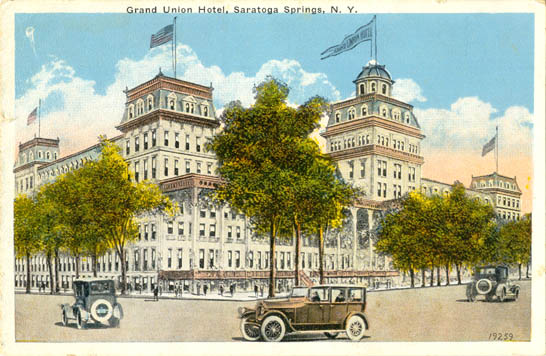
Grand Union Hotel Postcard c.1920

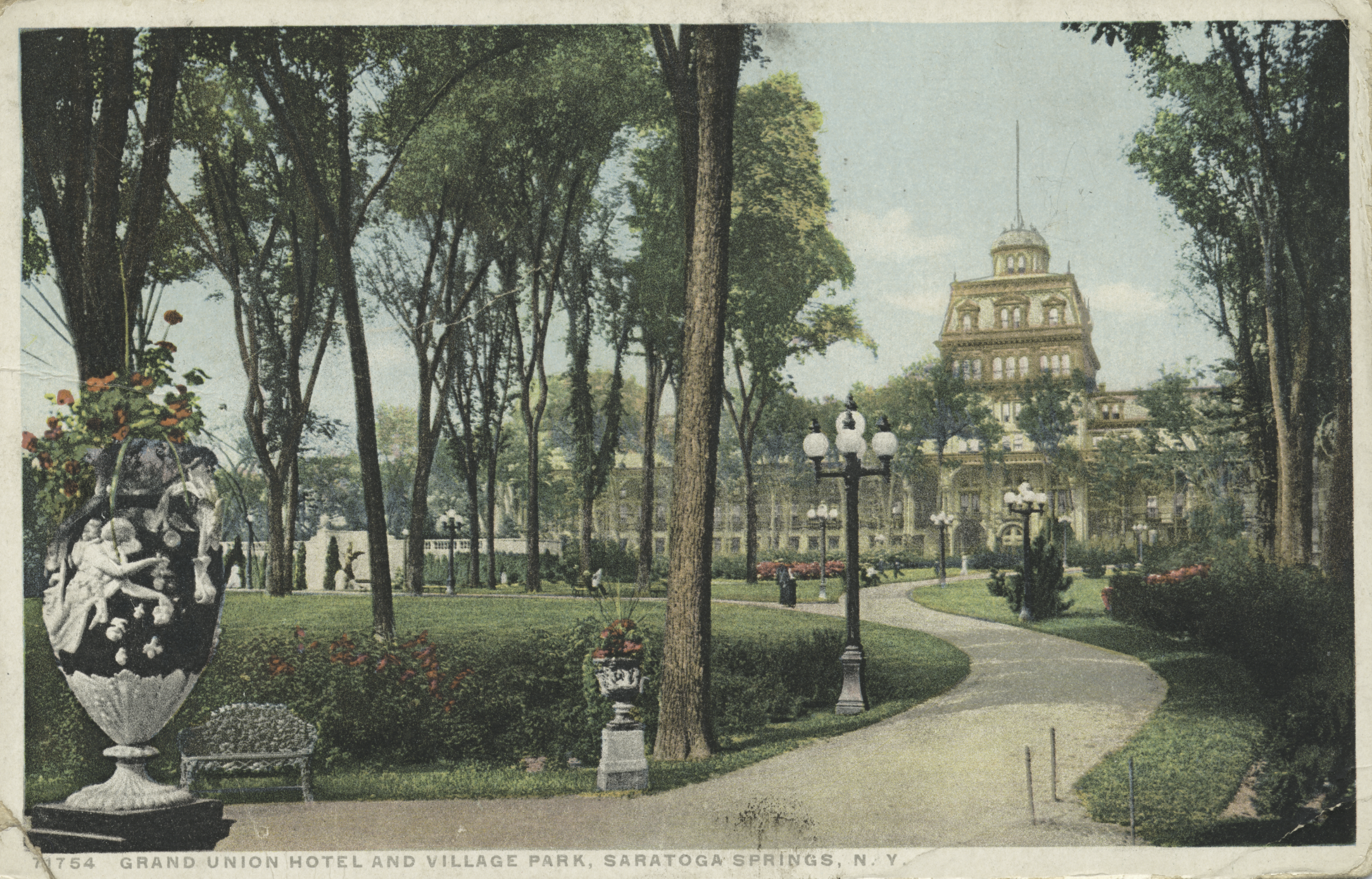
Park and hotel

Frank Hathorn purchased the Grand Union Hotel in 1912 to save the hotel for Saratoga Springs, but Hathorn died one year later. His daughter, Florence Hathorn, ran the Grand Union for many years; she sought to modernize the hotel during her proprietorship. She managed to refurnish and redecorate the lobby in green and white colors. She also sought to bring conventions to the hotel as Woolley had done before her, and was successful in bringing the Spanish War Veterans, Grand Lodge of Knights of Pythias, New York State Food Merchants Association, and the New York State CIO in 1944.

Dining was still served in the large dining room, and dancing was scheduled for Saturday nights, with music by Bernie Collins, a well-known band leader. The following year the hotel saw 14 conventions booked at the hotel. Rates for a room plus meals were $10 and $12 per day (for a room without a private bathroom). Private baths took up approximately 30% of the hotel, and rates for those rooms were $15 and $18 for singles and $22 to $40 for a double. The managers of the hotel estimated that it would cost $50,000 to get to the hotel ready for the summer season, that cost involving painting, papering, upholstering, plumbing, and restocking the inventory.

However, the Great Depression, followed by World War II took a heavy toll on the vacation industry and funds for updating the enormous structure. The city also enforced heavy taxes on the building. Florence Hathorn eventually sold the hotel to Tikvah Associates, Inc. of New York City. Irving Barasch was the president of this company, whose family owned the Empire and Brooklyn Hotels also located in Saratoga Springs.

Eventually the, Grand Union Hotel was purchased by a group of citizens as stockholders. The hotel was conducted by the late Edward C. Sweeny until 1950 when it was sold to Broadway Saratoga Corporation, headed by Louis Ginsberg from Glens Falls, for $150,000. The last corporation gave up the struggle to run the hotel after two years and sold it to the Grand Union Company.

The turn of the century saw a rise of anti-gambling sentiment. The Canfield Casino closed in 1904, and the Saratoga Race Course did not run in 1911 or 1912. This loss created a major economic loss for the city of Saratoga and for the Grand Union Hotel. The future of the hotel was foreshadowed by the demolition of Congress Hall Hotel in 1913. Frank's father Henry H. Hathorn previously owned and rebuilt the Congress Hall Hotel.

== 1950 – Demolition ==
Dismantling the Grand Union Hotel in Saratoga Springs, c. 1952

The Grand Union Hotel was sold to auctioneers George & Hyman Siegel for $400,000. That price included $100,000 for the furnishings and $300,000 for the real estate.

The building was demolished little by little, from 1952 to 1953, on the 150th anniversary of the building of the hotel. Prior to the demolition, the auctioneers sold the contents of the hotel. The famous crystal chandeliers ended up in a hotel in Washington, D.C. after being sold for $1,500, and the inlaid wood floors ended up in a factory in Cohoes, NY.

The Genius of America was donated to the New York State Education Department.

In the vacant spot, a supermarket was constructed. Ironically, the name of the supermarket was the Grand Union, although the name was purely coincidental.
