= Green Island Bridge =

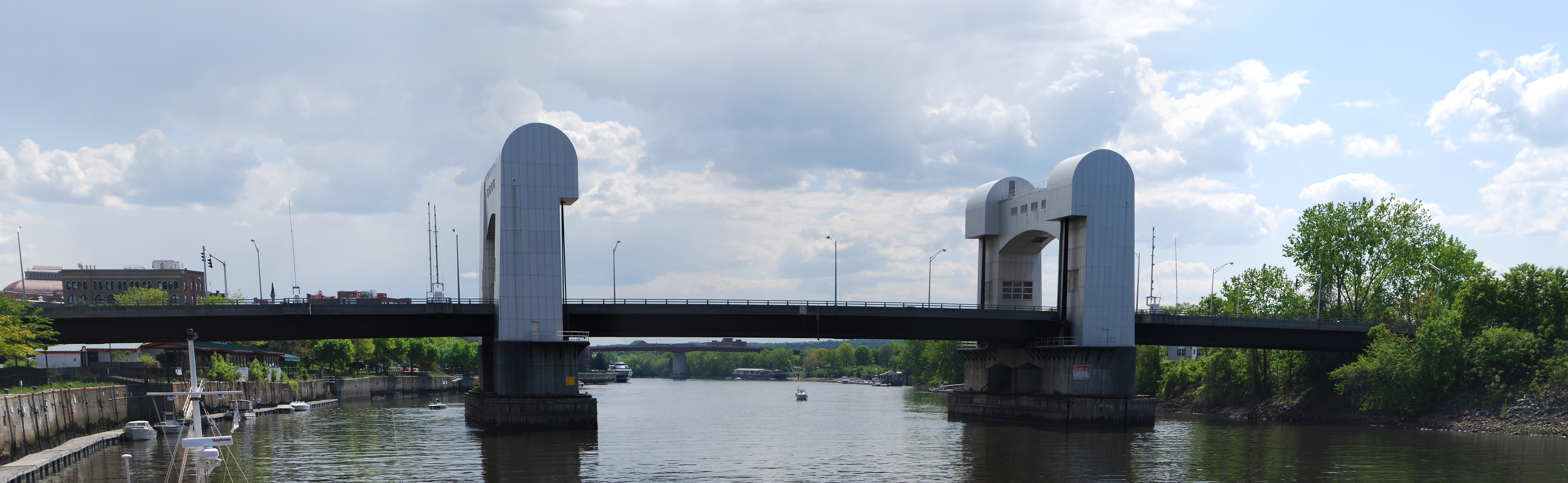
- View from the north
- Coordinates: 42°44′7.66″N 73°41′23.12″W
- Carries: 4 traffic lanes of NY 915B
- Crosses: Hudson River
- Locale: Village of Green Island and City of Troy, New York
- Official name: Green Island-Troy Bridge
- Other name(s): Green Island-Troy Bridge
- Maintained by: New York State Department of Transportation
- ID number: 1095910

Characteristics
- Design: Vertical-lift bridge

History
- Opened: September 12, 1981

The Green Island Bridge crosses the Hudson River in New York, connecting Green Island with Troy, passing through Starbuck Island. It opened September 12, 1981.

== History ==
The original Rensselaer and Saratoga Railroad bridge was a wood-truss covered bridge built in 1832. On May 10, 1862, it caught fire from the sparks of a passing locomotive and soon fell into the river. Parts of the burning structure, floating with the current, imperiled the steamboats and the smaller craft tied up along the wharves. The devastating wind-driven fire also consumed more than 500 buildings covering 75 acres (300,000 m^{2}) of downtown Troy. This bridge was replaced by a second wooden bridge.

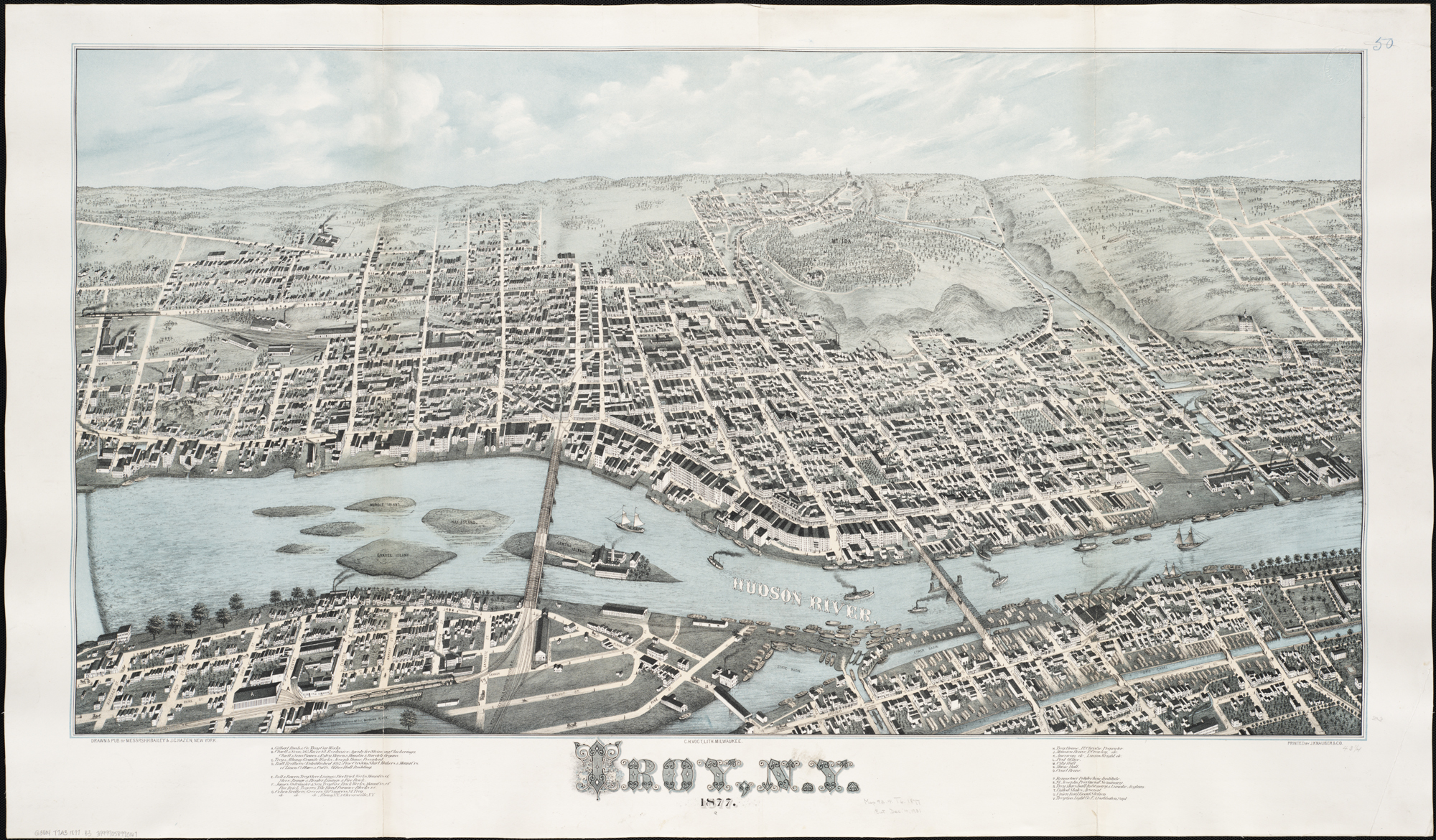
Bird's eye view of Troy from 1877 showing the rail line across the bridge curving towards the right to the rebuilt Union Station

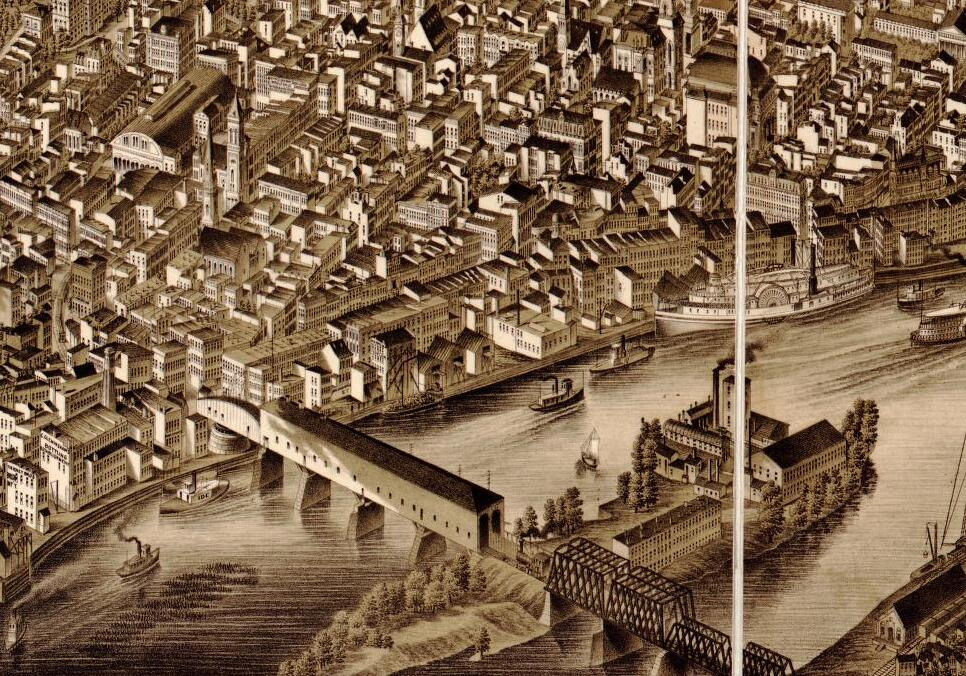
1881 bird's eye view of Troy, cropped for the rebuilt bridge and Union Station

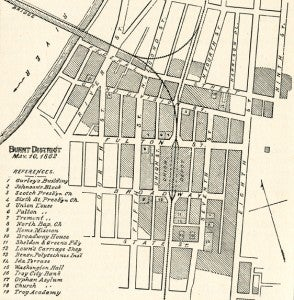
Map of the extent of the fire damage, including Union Station

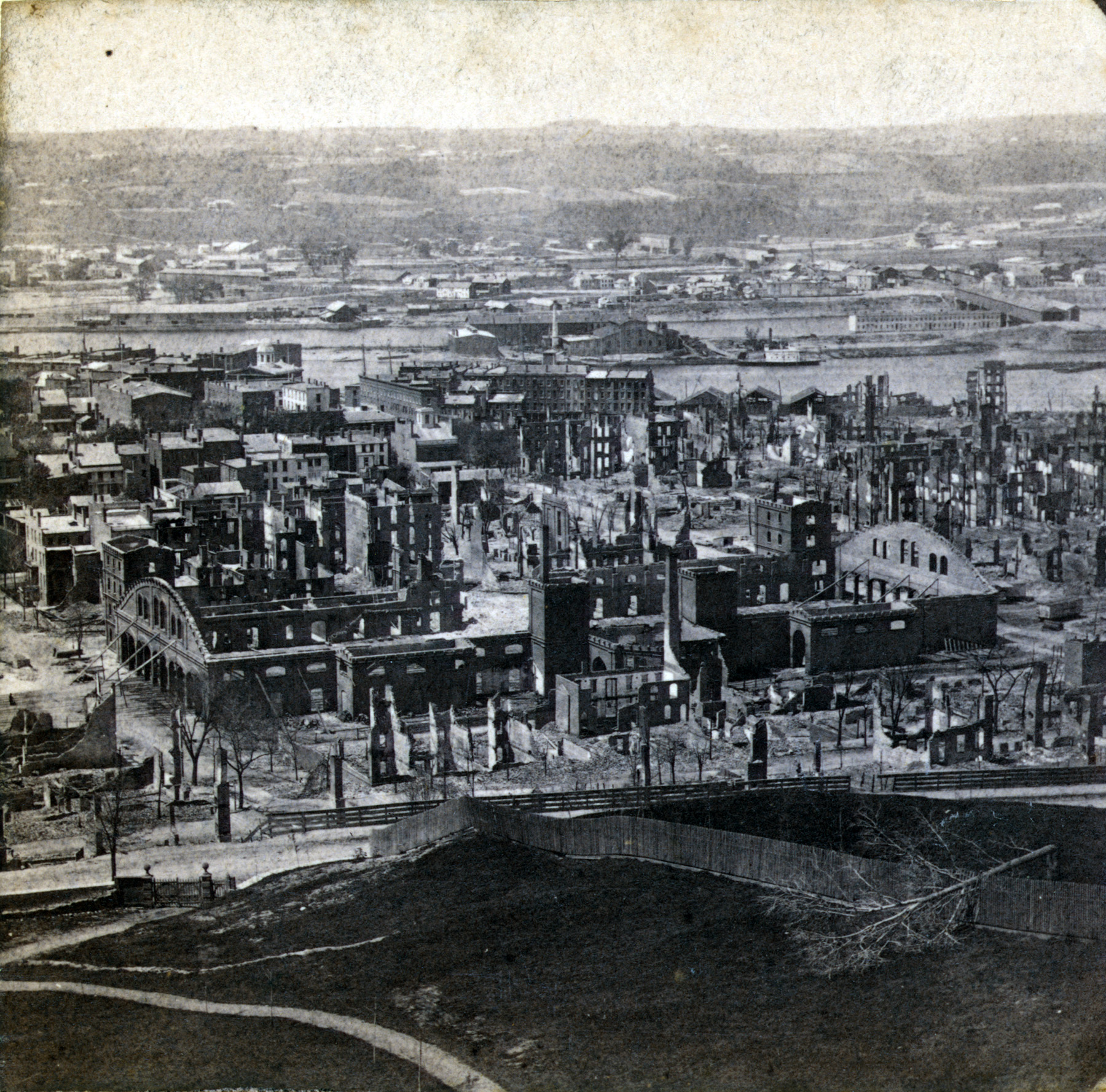
Photo of the burned Union Station, looking towards the river - Remaining part of the Western portion of the covered Green Island Bridge is just visible above right

In 1884 a steel railroad bridge replaced the second wooden bridge. The steel bridge was really two parallel bridges owned by the Delaware and Hudson Railroad. When rail service ended in Troy on July 27, 1963, it was converted for automobile traffic. Until then the northern span was a rail bridge, and the southern span was a toll bridge for cars, trolleys, and pedestrians. It had a lift span added in 1924-25 for river shipping. This bridge failed on March 15, 1977, due to flooding caused by 2.7 inches (69 mm) of heavy weekend rains, coupled with melting snows and heavy runoff. The flood-induced scour undermined the lift span pier, causing the western lift tower and roadbed span of the bridge to collapse into the Hudson River. Luckily, NY Telephone personnel were working in that area and noted that things were not right, managing to stop traffic so that people were not on the bridge when it fell.

The current Green Island Bridge (shown in the photos) was opened four-and-a-half years later on September 12, 1981. Construction costs topped $23,000,000. The bridge is a vertical lift bridge which is raised only occasionally for river traffic. The two metal-covered frames, which straddle the roadway, house the counterweights and lift mechanisms. The lift bridge joins Troy and Center Island (once known as Starbuck Island), an island in the river. There is another bridge that connects Center Island with the village of Green Island (which is no longer an island).

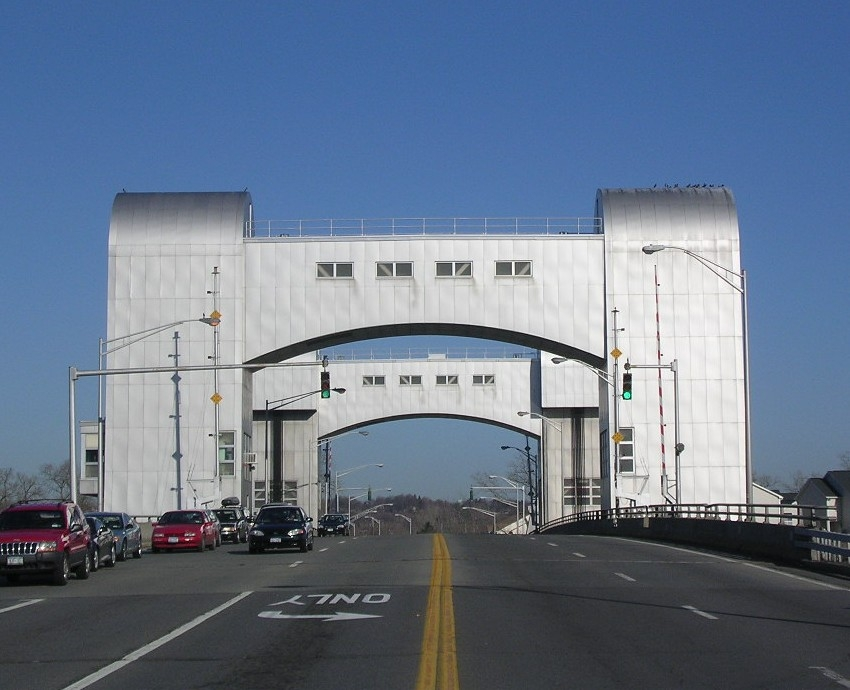
Green Island Bridge - roadway view

== See also ==
- List of fixed crossings of the Hudson River
- List of reference routes in New York
