= Great Fire of Troy =

Large fire in Troy, New York, in 1862

Coordinates: 42.732°N 73.687°W

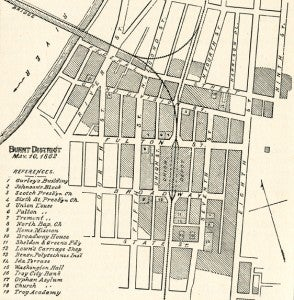
A map of the areas in Troy hit by the Great Fire.

The Great Fire of Troy occurred on May 10, 1862, and destroyed a large part of the downtown area of Troy, New York. The damage caused by the fire was approximately $3,000,000, with between about 500 to 600 buildings destroyed over 75 acres (30 ha).

== Background ==
The Rensselaer and Saratoga Railroad Green Island Bridge was a wood-truss covered bridge built in 1832, and used by trains to cross the Hudson River from downtown Troy. The majority of the buildings in downtown area were also made of timber, making them susceptible to fires.

Troy had recently bought new steam-powered fire trucks, which were more efficient than the handheld pumpers used at the time.

== Incident ==
On May 11, 1862, a strong wind was blowing in downtown Troy. Around noon, a train, driven by George C. Troyibald, had left the Troy Union Depot and was crossing the Green Island Bridge when sparks from the engine caused the wooden shingles on the roof of the bridge to catch on fire. Parts of the burning structure, floating with the river current, imperiled the steamboats and the smaller craft tied up along the wharves. Fueled by heavy winds, the embers from the fire spread throughout the downtown.

== Impact ==
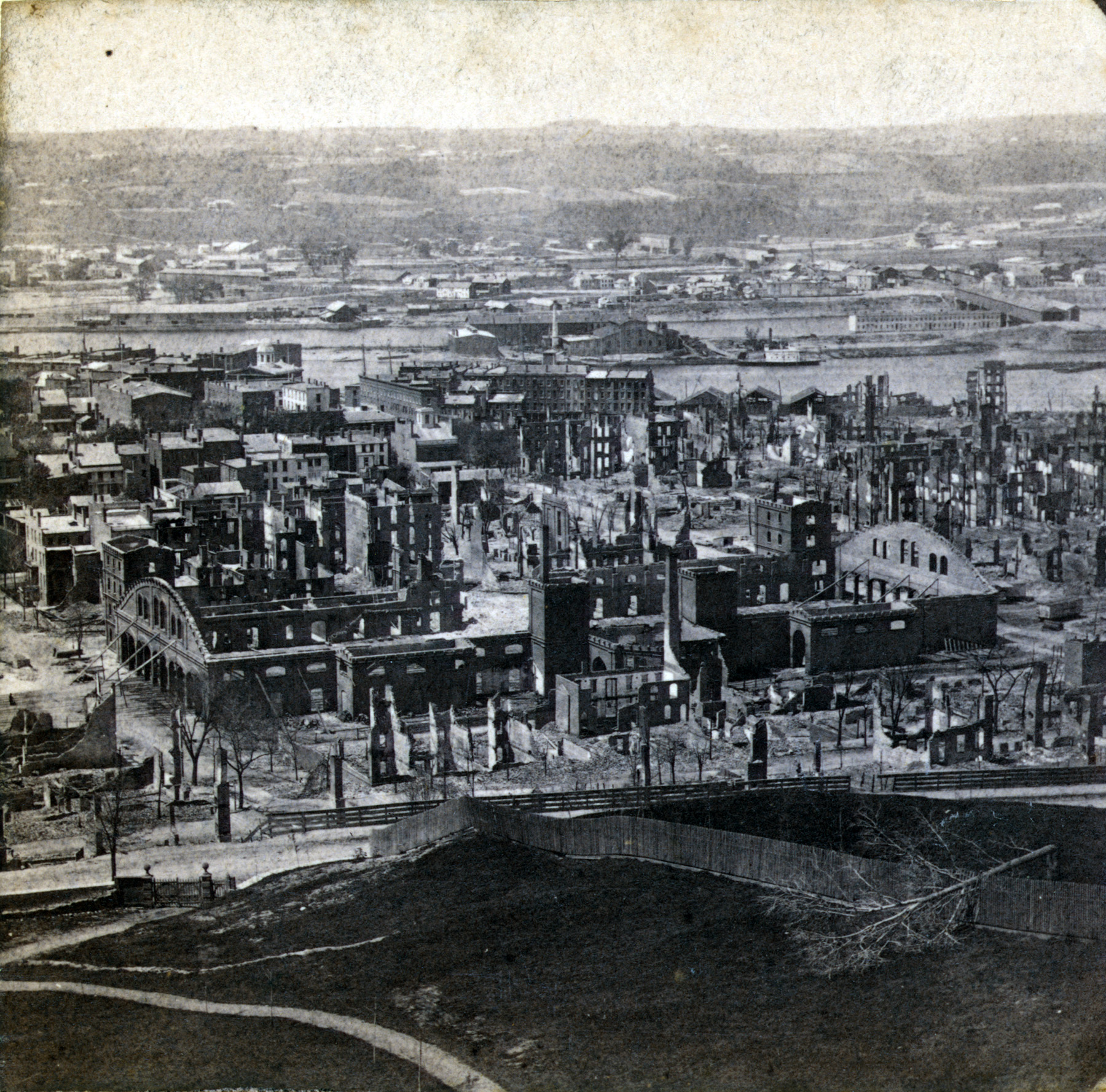
Downtown Troy with roofless Union Station after the fire

Within six hours, the fire had been extinguished, partly due to the use of the new fire appliances. However, the fires had burned through over 500 buildings and taken the lives of 8 people. Most of the destroyed buildings were private residences.

The entire campus of Rensselaer Polytechnic Institute, located in downtown Troy at the time, was destroyed by the fire.

== Aftermath ==
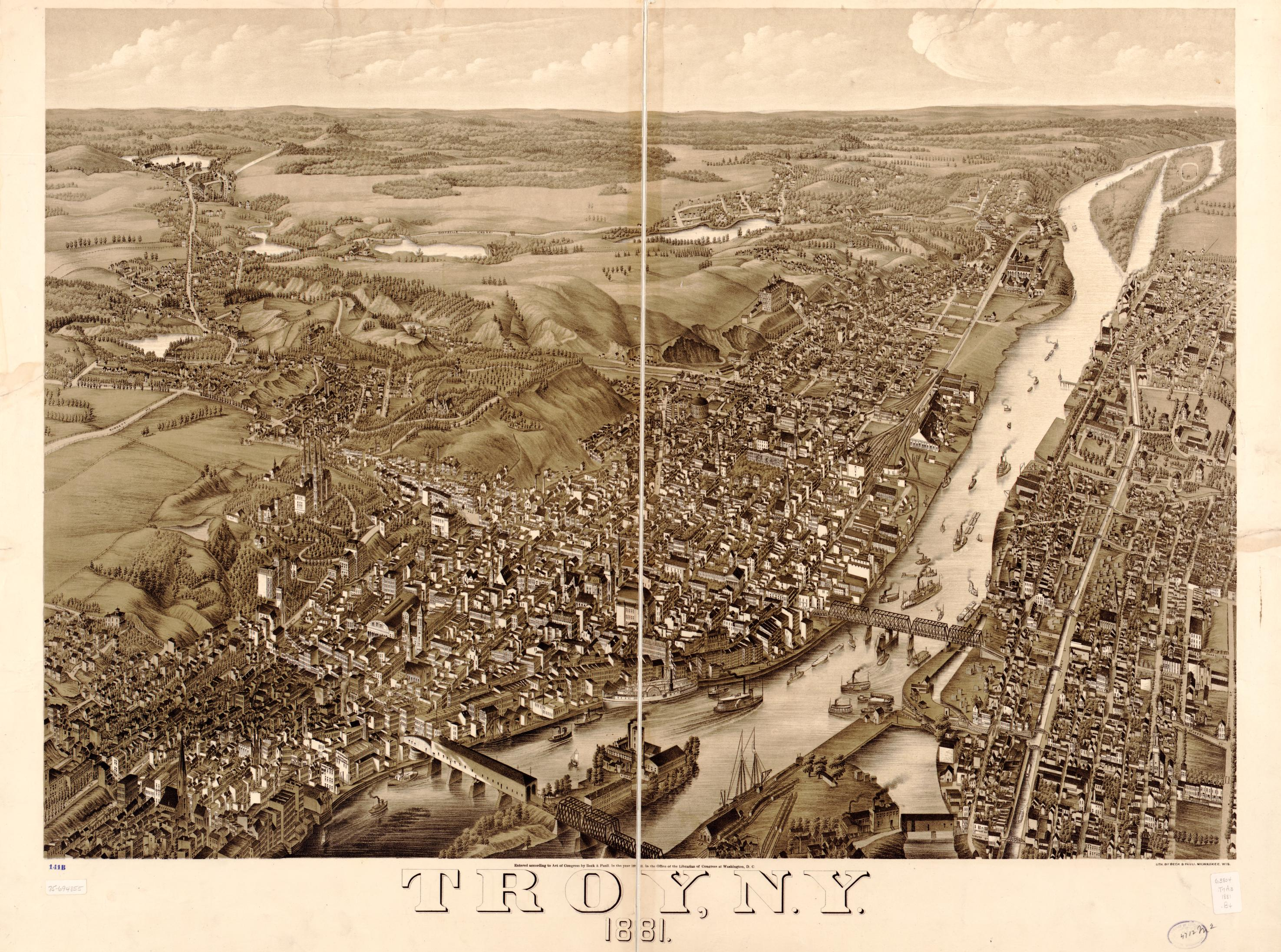
Bird's eye view of Troy in 1881, looking south and showing both the covered bridge to Green Island at the bottom and the Union Station rebuilt on the left

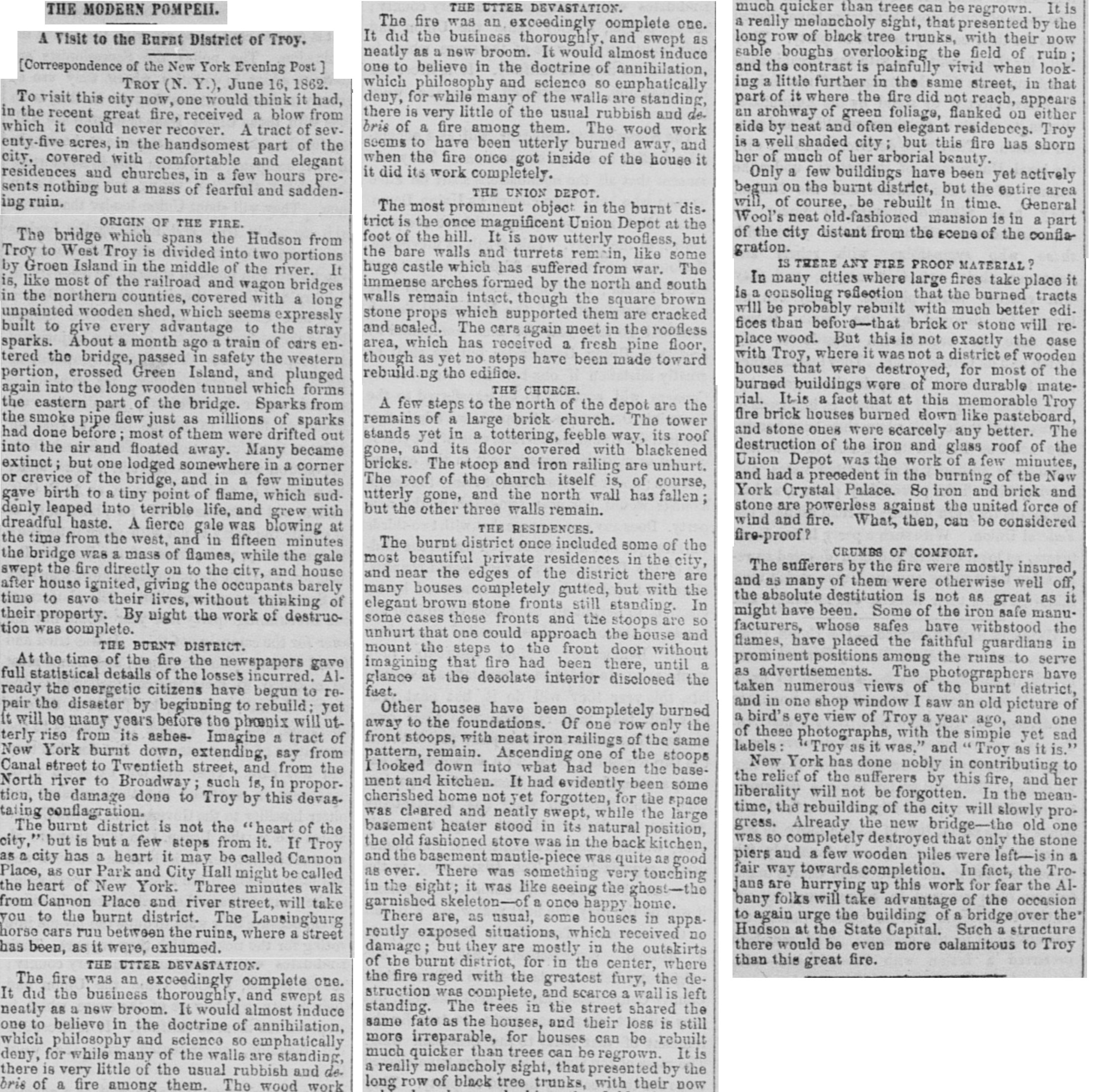
News article from the summer of 1862 printed in the New York Evening Post and reprinted in the Sacramento Daily Union, claiming the bridge itself was the first priority to rebuild

Troy quickly rebuilt, fueled by the need to get production back up for the Civil War, with most of the burnt areas either been rebuilt or in the process of being rebuilt in six months after the fire.

== Exhibit ==
In 2012 the Rensselaer County Historical Society opened an exhibit commemorating the 150th anniversary of the fire.
