= Green Island, New York =

Green Island
- Town and village
- Town of Green Island; Village of Green Island
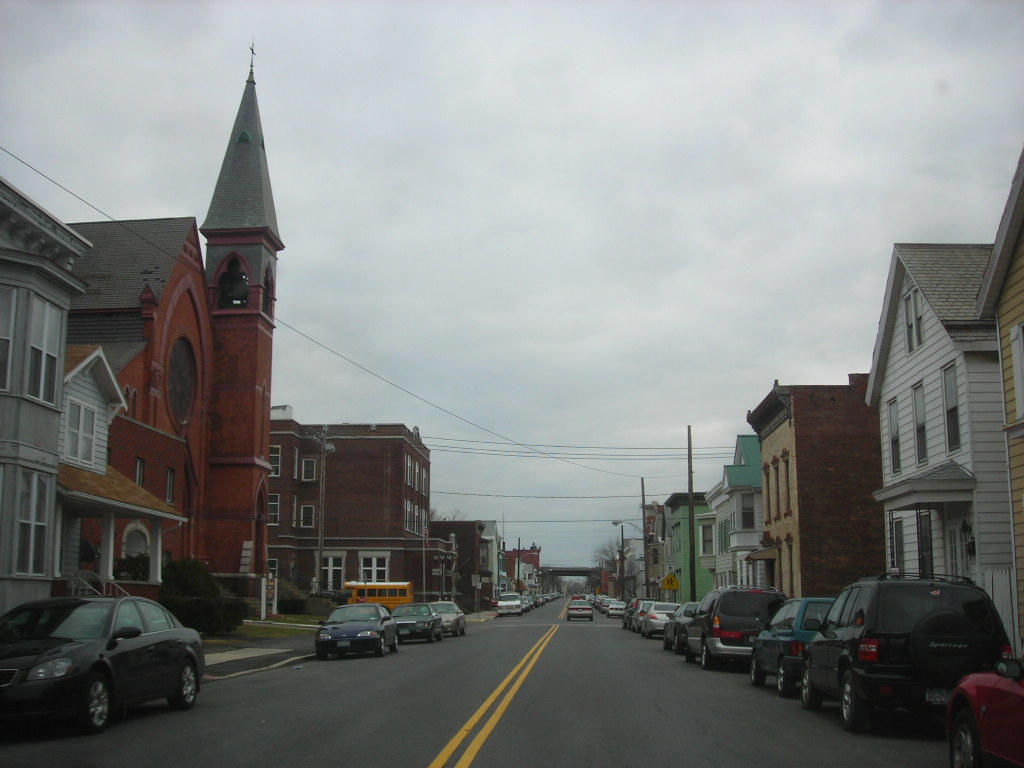
- George Street looking south towards the former St. Joseph's Church

- Seal

- Location in Albany County and the state of New York.

- Location of New York in the United States

- Location in New York Green Island (the United States)
- Coordinates: 42°44′39″N 73°41′29″W
- Country: United States
- State: New York
- County: Albany
- Incorporation as village: 1853
- Incorporation as town: 1896

Government
  - Mayor: Ellen McNulty-Ryan (D) Town Council: Theodore Konioka (D); Michael Neaton (D); Philip Gross (D); Melvin Bouchey (D)

Area
  - Total: 0.93 sq mi (2.42 km^{2})
  - Land: 0.75 sq mi (1.94 km^{2})
  - Water: 0.19 sq mi (0.48 km^{2})
- Elevation: 23 ft (7.0 m)
- Lowest elevation: 0 ft (0 m)

Population (2020)
  - Total: 2,934
  - Density: 3,927.0/sq mi (1,516.23/km^{2})
- Time zone: UTC-5 (EST)
  - Summer (DST): UTC-4 (EDT)
- ZIP Code: 12183
- Area code: 518
- FIPS code: 36-001-30532
- FIPS code: 36-30521
- GNIS feature ID: 0951697
- Wikimedia Commons: Green Island, New York
- Website: villageofgreenisland.com

Green Island is a coterminous town-village in Albany County, New York, United States, some 8 miles (13 km) north of Albany. Green Island is one of only five such town-village amalgamations in New York. The population was 2,934 at the 2020 census, and the ZIP code is 12183. While the town of Green Island was once an island, it was connected to the mainland on the west side of the Hudson River in the 1960s.

Green Island is also the smallest town, by area, in New York, covering 0.7 square miles (1.8 km^{2}); by contrast, the largest towns in the state by area are Brookhaven, which covers an area of 531.5 square miles (1,377 km^{2}) (though much of that is water), and Webb, which has the largest land area at 483 square miles (1,250 km^{2}).

== History ==
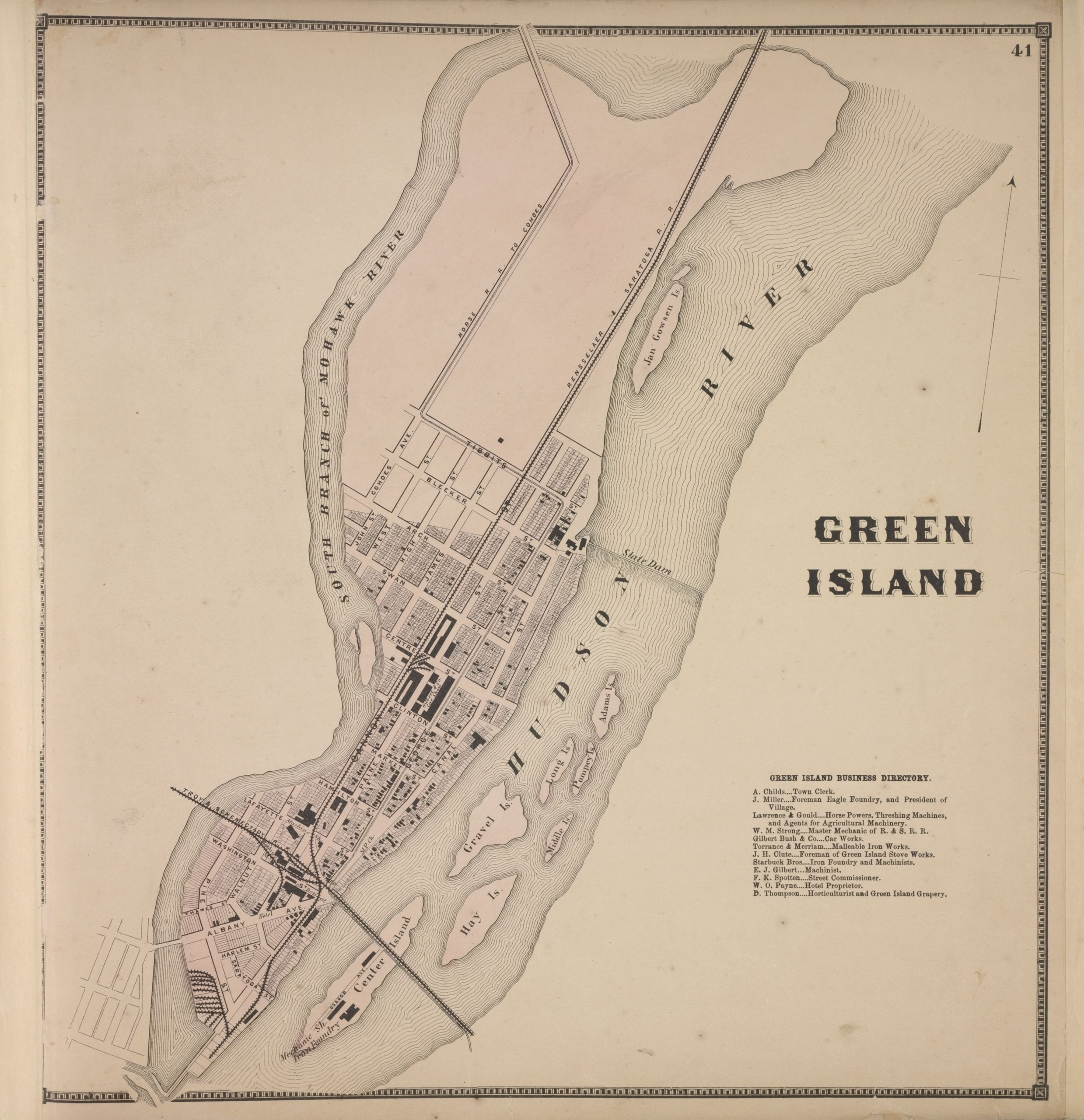
Green Island in 1866

Today's town and village of Green Island is connected to the mainland on the west side of the Hudson River. However, it was once called Tibbett's Island and is situated on land that was, in the past, an island. The First (or South) Branch of the Mohawk River delta once ran between the island and Watervliet, separating the island from mainland Albany County. The river branch was filled in during construction of Interstate 787 in the 1960s.

Green Island was called by the Native Americans Pachanhanit or Nehanenesick, and was owned by the natives Amenhanit, Aepjen, and Wanapet until they sold it in 1665. The island was part of the Manor of Rensselaerswyck begun by the Patroon Kiliaen van Rensselaer, whose great-grandson (Colonel Kiliaen van Rensselaer) sold the island in 1708 to Colonel Pieter Schuyler. The island was sold, in 1714, to Hendrick Oothout. In 1796, the northern part of the island was purchased by George Tibbits, after whom the island received its name of Tibbits Island; while the southern portion of the island was sold by the Oothout family in 1833 to Daniel Cady. The next year, Cady sold the land to the Tibbits family.

Much like its larger neighboring cities; Troy, Watervliet, and Cohoes; Green Island was a major manufacturing and transportation center. In 1823, the Federal Dam was built between Green Island and Troy, allowing for year-round navigation north on the Hudson River to Waterford and Lansingburgh. In 1834, a terminal was built on the island by the Rensselaer and Saratoga Railroad, which the following year built the first Green Island Bridge for railroad use from Green Island to Troy. The Rensselaer and Saratoga Railroad built its locomotive and car shops in 1842 in Green Island. Even after the Delaware and Hudson Railroad (D&H) took over and consolidated operations to the Colonie Shops (just west of Watervliet), the Green Island Shops continued to be a repair shop and were frequently mentioned in trade magazines during the 1930s regarding their experiments with new methods and materials; such as light weight steel. Green Island, population 800, was incorporated in 1853 as a village in the town of Watervliet. In that same year the Gilbert Car Company had a railroad car factory built in Green Island after their Troy location burned, it too would experience a fire in 1862, and finally went out of business in 1895. The town of Green Island was formed in 1896, which also created the city of Watervliet, a year after the division of the original town of Watervliet that created the town of Colonie.

It was automobile manufacturing, and not the railroads, that would soon become important to Green Island when Thomas Edison; whose General Electric was located in nearby Schenectady and who frequently fished off the northern end of Green Island; introduced his friend, Henry Ford, to the village. In 1919 Ford, Edison, John Burroughs, Harvey Firestone, Harvey Firestone Jr., and the manager of Ford's Upper Peninsula of Michigan operations camped and fished on land in Green Island, that would, in 1922, become The Ford Motor Company's plant manufacturing radiators and springs. At one point the plant employed close to 1,000. The location was convenient because of the Federal Dam which was used to provide hydroelectric power to operate the plant. Edison also considered building a factory at Green Island as well, which Ford believed would use electricity generated at his hydro power plant. The Ford plant served as Green Island's largest employer until it was closed in 1989. Although the factory portion was demolished in 2004, the dam remains active and continues to produce electricity, now owned by the Green Island Power Authority (GIPA). The cheap electricity supplied by GIPA has lured many businesses to Green Island's north end, including Zak Incorporated, Honeywell Friction Materials, Long Island Pipe Supply, General Control Systems, Crystal IS, the New York State Department of Taxation and Finance, Sealy Mattress Company, Reliable Brothers, and Case Window & Door Inc.

The Rensselaer and Saratoga Railroad: Green Island Shops and St. Mark's Episcopal Church are listed on the National Register of Historic Places.

=== McNulty political dynasty ===
One of the Capital Region's most powerful political families first came to power in 1917 when John "Jack" McNulty Sr. was elected Green Island tax collector. He took over as head of the Green Island municipal Democratic Party in 1919, a position that he held until his death fifty years later in 1969. His son, John "Jack" McNulty Jr., was elected to the post as his immediate successor. He would be succeeded by his son Michael R. McNulty in the 1970s, marking the sixth decade the post had been held by a McNulty. McNulty Jr. won his first election as town supervisor in 1949, a position his son Michael would also hold. Jack Jr., his son Michael and his daughter Ellen McNulty-Ryan have each served terms as Green Island's mayor. Michael was also elected to Congress, representing New York's 21st congressional district from 1989 to 2009 (numbered as the 23rd for his first two terms).

== Green Island Power Authority ==
The town/village has its own electric company in the form of the Green Island Power Authority (GIPA) which owns and operates a hydroelectric power plant in the Hudson River off the island. GIPA was created in 1986 by the state and used eminent domain to seize the former Ford Plant hydroelectric dam in 2000, from then-owner Niagara Mohawk. GIPA sells the electricity into the state's wholesale market, administered by the NYISO, and then buys from the New York Power Authority cheaper hydroelectric power generated at Niagara Falls. This cheap power is credited with attracting manufacturers and high-tech industry to the island's historically industrial north end. The hydro plant on the Hudson River has four turbines and generates approximately six megawatts. As of 2008, GIPA's rates are approximately 40% cheaper for the residents and businesses in Green Island than the traditional utilities in neighboring communities.

== Geography ==
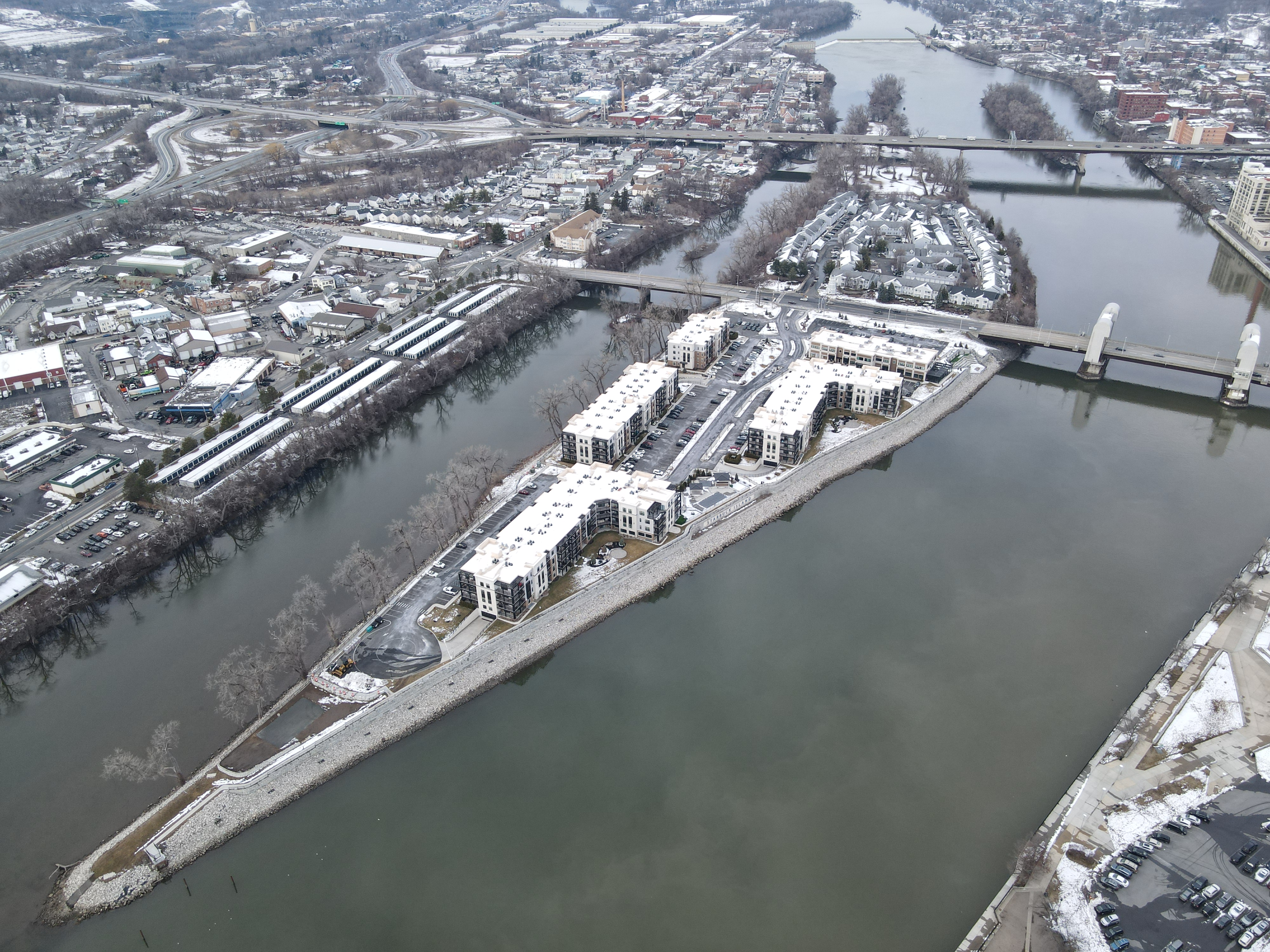
Center Island (also called Starbuck Island) in March 2023

Green Island is located at 42°44′39″N 73°41′39″W (42.744178, -73.694219).

According to the United States Census Bureau, the village has a total area of 0.9 square miles (2.3 km^{2}), of which 0.7 square miles (1.8 km^{2}) is land and 0.2 square miles (0.52 km^{2}) (23.91%) is water.

Green Island is located south of where the Mohawk River empties into the Hudson River in Albany County, New York. To the west is the hamlet of Maplewood within the town of Colonie, to the north is the city of Cohoes, the city of Watervliet is to the south-west, and the city of Troy in Rensselaer County is to the east across the Hudson River.

The village of Green Island, in addition to the former island of the same name, has two other islands, Center Island (also known as Starbuck Island) and McGill Island. Center Island is crossed by the Green Island Bridge and directly east of the mainland and west of Downtown Troy. The River's Edge apartment complex lies to the north of the bridge. McGill Island is a small unpopulated island north of Center Island. It is frequently flooded.

== Demographics ==
Historical population
Census	Pop.	Note	%±
1860	1,600		—
1870	3,135		95.9%
1880	4,160		32.7%
1890	4,463		7.3%
1900	4,770		6.9%
1910	4,737		−0.7%
1920	4,411		−6.9%
1930	4,331		−1.8%
1940	3,988		−7.9%
1950	4,016		0.7%
1960	3,533		−12.0%
1970	3,297		−6.7%
1980	2,696		−18.2%
1990	2,490		−7.6%
2000	2,278		−8.5%
2010	2,620		15.0%
2020	2,934		12.0%
U.S. Decennial Census

=== 2020 census ===
As of the 2020 census, Green Island had a population of 2,934. The median age was 37.6 years. 15.7% of residents were under the age of 18 and 16.2% of residents were 65 years of age or older. For every 100 females there were 95.3 males, and for every 100 females age 18 and over there were 95.0 males age 18 and over.

100.0% of residents lived in urban areas, while 0.0% lived in rural areas.

There were 1,493 households in Green Island, of which 20.4% had children under the age of 18 living in them. Of all households, 20.0% were married-couple households, 32.1% were households with a male householder and no spouse or partner present, and 38.3% were households with a female householder and no spouse or partner present. About 45.8% of all households were made up of individuals and 15.0% had someone living alone who was 65 years of age or older.

There were 1,816 housing units, of which 17.8% were vacant. The homeowner vacancy rate was 3.0% and the rental vacancy rate was 9.3%.

Racial composition as of the 2020 census
Race	Number	Percent
White	2,155	73.4%
Black or African American	228	7.8%
American Indian and Alaska Native	16	0.5%
Asian	196	6.7%
Native Hawaiian and Other Pacific Islander	0	0.0%
Some other race	49	1.7%
Two or more races	290	9.9%
Hispanic or Latino (of any race)	137	4.7%

=== 2000 census ===
As of the census of 2000, there were 2,278 people, 1,073 households, and 580 families residing in the village. The population density was 3,262.1 inhabitants per square mile (1,259.5/km^{2}). There were 1,188 housing units at an average density of 1,701.2 per square mile (656.8/km^{2}). The racial makeup of the village was 96.88% White, 1.32% African American, 0.13% Native American, 0.35% Asian, 0.09% from other races, and 1.23% from two or more races. Hispanic or Latino of any race were 0.75% of the population.

There were 1,073 households, out of which 24.9% had children under the age of 18 living with them, 34.9% were married couples living together, 14.4% had a female householder with no husband present, and 45.9% were non-families. 38.9% of all households were made up of individuals, and 12.9% had someone living alone who was 65 years of age or older. The average household size was 2.12 and the average family size was 2.83.

In the village, the population was spread out, with 21.2% under the age of 18, 9.1% from 18 to 24, 32.1% from 25 to 44, 22.3% from 45 to 64, and 15.3% who were 65 years of age or older. The median age was 37 years. For every 100 females, there were 93.4 males. For every 100 females age 18 and over, there were 88.9 males.

The median income for a household in the village was $32,500, and the median income for a family was $38,011. Males had a median income of $31,403 versus $27,422 for females. The per capita income for the village was $17,795. About 10.8% of families and 10.0% of the population were below the poverty line, including 13.3% of those under age 18 and 5.2% of those age 65 or over.

== See also ==
- Green Island Bridge collapse and rebuilding
