= Gideon Putnam Burying Ground =

Historic cemetery in New York, United States

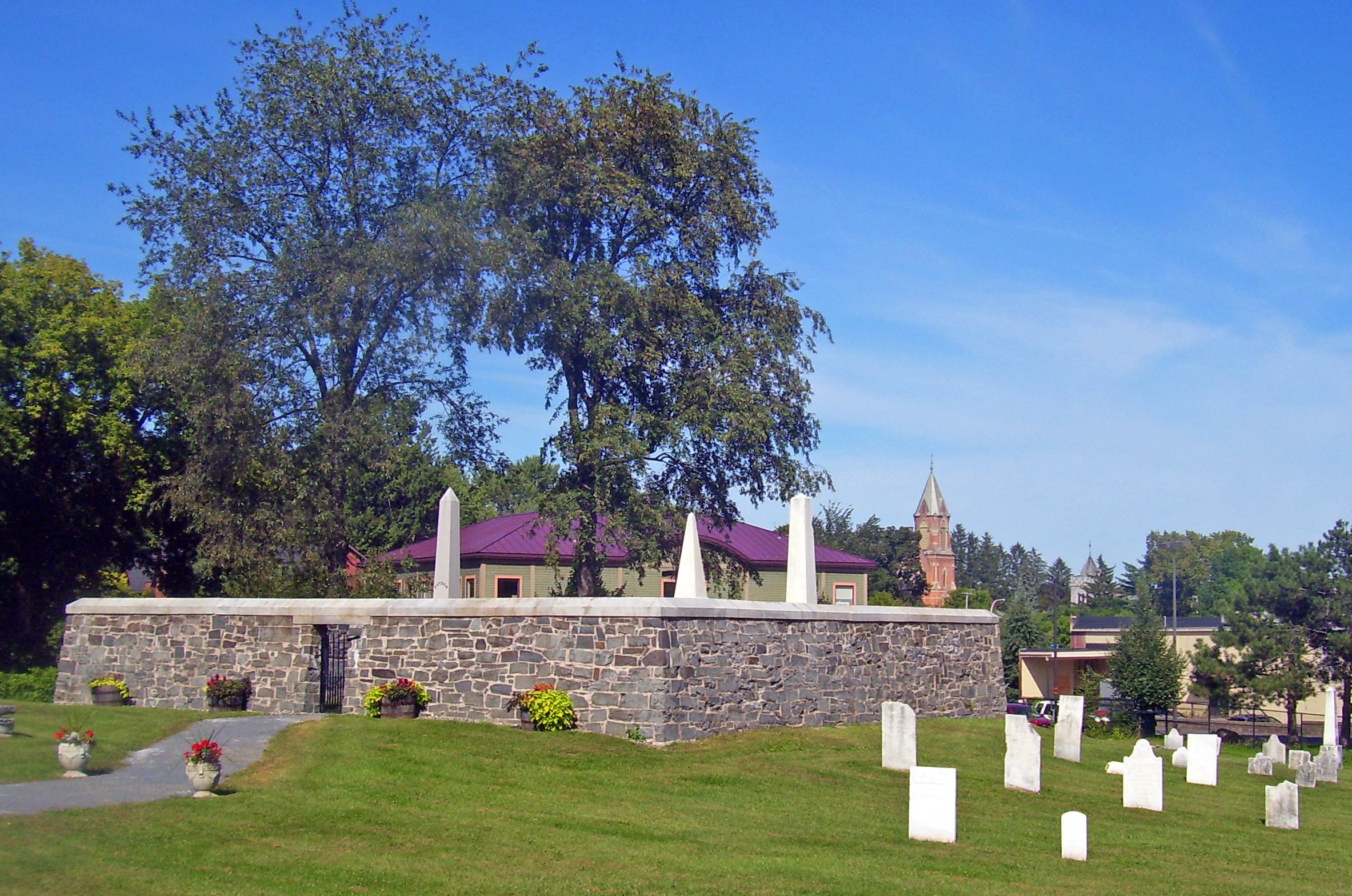
- Stone wall around Putnam family plot, 2008
- Interactive map of Gideon Putnam Burying Ground

Details
- Established: 1810
- Location: Franklin St., Saratoga Springs, New York
- Country: United States
- Coordinates: 43°4′42″N 73°47′30″W
- Type: public
- Size: 1.1 acres (4,500 m^{2})
- No. of graves: 161
- Gideon Putnam Burying Ground
- U.S. National Register of Historic Places
- NRHP reference No.: 03001279
- Added to NRHP: December 12, 2003

The Gideon Putnam Burying Ground is located on South Franklin Street in Saratoga Springs, New York, United States. It contains over 150 graves of early and mid-19th century residents of the city, all from the period between 1812 and 1871. It was restored in the 1980s after suffering from almost a century of neglect.

Gideon Putnam was the city's founder. He built one of its first resort hotels, and laid out the grid plan that guided its subsequent development. He intended for this parcel to be used as a public cemetery, and became its first burial after his death from injuries sustained in a construction accident. His grave is the only extant remnant of his presence in the city he founded.

His premature death and burial meant that, apart from the Putnam family plot, it was not used much as a public cemetery since no plans or preparation had been made for that purpose. In 2003 it was listed on the National Register of Historic Places.

== Property ==
The cemetery is on an irregularly shaped 1.1-acre (4,500 m^{2}) plot on the east side of South Franklin just south of Grand Avenue, opposite the Oak Street junction. It is just outside the Broadway and West Side historic districts. The neighborhood is residential, with houses across South Franklin to the west and an apartment complex on the east. A chainlink fence runs along South Franklin.

There are 161 marked graves scattered around the property, in no regular pattern. Most headstones are of marble or granite; some are unadorned and others show common 19th-century funerary art such as urn-and-willow motifs. On a rise in the north central portion is the Putnam family plot, surrounded by a fieldstone wall with smooth stone coping. Access to it is provided by a wrought iron gate with stone lintel. The graves of Gideon Putnam and his wife are marked by obelisks.

== History ==
Putnam arrived in the area in 1789 from his native Connecticut to get into the lumber business. He soon saw the potential of the springs to attract visitors to the region, and built the first hotel, Putnam's Tavern (later the Union House) in 1802 near Congress Spring in what is today Congress Park. It was a success.

Three years later, in 1805, he bought the 130 acres (53 ha) surrounding the spring and began laying out a plan for the village of Saratoga Springs. When published in 1810, it included the current parcel as a non-sectarian community burial ground.

The next year, Putnam fell from a scaffold while overseeing the construction of another hotel, Congress Hall. He ultimately died of complications from the injuries late in 1812 and became the burying ground's first occupant. Since it had not yet been prepared for use as a cemetery, and there was no entity to oversee its use, no plan was in place.

The Putnams continued to use it as their family plot, and allowed other local residents to be buried there with their permission. They turned it over to the village in 1835, three years after the construction of the Schenectady & Saratoga Railroad and the extension of South Franklin Street had required new boundaries on the east and west.

Burials increased in the 1830s and 1840s after it became a public graveyard. The neighborhood around it continued to grow and be developed, leaving it somewhat isolated from other open space and the village's downtown. In 1844 a new, larger public cemetery was opened on the west of the village, and burials trailed off until the last one occurred in 1871.

Maintenance declined, and within four years residents deplored the neglected condition of the cemetery, with overturned headstones and overgrown graves. A survey conducted in 1876 recorded 250 separate inscriptions, but as the neglect continued into the 20th century, the decay and vandalism took their toll. By 1922 the local Daughters of the American Revolution could identify just 89 graves.

Extensive restoration efforts in the 1980s led to the current number of graves identified. Since then it has been regularly maintained and secured.

== See also ==
- National Register of Historic Places listings in Saratoga County, New York
