= Gideon Putnam =

American miller and entrepreneur

Gideon Putnam (April 17, 1763 – December 1, 1812) was an entrepreneur and a founder of Saratoga Springs, New York. He also worked as a miller and built the city's Grand Union and Congress Hotels. The Gideon Putnam Hotel in the Saratoga Spa State Park is named after Putnam.

Putnam was a nephew of revolutionary war generals Rufus Putnam and Israel Putnam.

== Early life ==
Putnam was born to Mary (née Gibbs) and Stephen Putnam in 1763 in Sutton, Massachusetts. He was one of twelve children. In 1787, when Putnam was 19 years old, Putnam married 16-year-old Doanda Risley of Hartford, Connecticut. They went on to have five sons and four daughters. Their son Lewis was the "first white child born in Saratoga". The couple traveled to Middlebury, Vermont, where Putnam attempted to make a living as a miller. The settlement is now within the grounds of Middlebury College. Since the nearest gristmill was 40 miles (64 km) away with thick woods in between, he devised a method to grind grain on his own, "[cutting] out the top of [a] stump, and with a wooden pestle fitted to the excavation [grinding] their grain". Finding these circumstances undesirable, the Putnams moved to Rutland, Vermont, where their first son Benjamin was born.

In 1788 the Putnams traveled to Bemis Heights, New York, with Doanda's sister and brother-in-law, Anne (née Risley) and Dr. Clement Blakesley, respectively. Putnam found the land and wood in Bemis Heights to be especially agreeable, so he resolved to stay, constructing a loghouse for shelter. However, in spring of that year, torrential rains swept into the area, and the families were marooned by floods. A neighbor, Zophar Scidmore, came to their rescue in a sailboat. After staying in Scidmore's home for several days, the families departed, following an Indian trail to Saratoga Springs.

== Saratoga Springs ==
In spring 1789, the Putnams settled in western Saratoga Springs, where 25-year-old Putnam constructed a log cabin adjacent to a freshwater spring. In reflection of his new life, Putnam said, "This is a healthy place; the mineral springs are valuable, and the timber is good and in great abundance, and I can build me a great house".

=== Sawmill ===
In 1791, Putnam rented 300 acres of land from Dirck Lefferts and opened a sawmill on Fish Creek, which flows from Saratoga Lake to the Hudson River. With the help of wheelwright William Patching, Putnam's sawmill produced staves and shingles. The first shipment of lumber was sold in New York City; shortly thereafter his business became successful.

=== Hotel ===
In 1802, Putnam purchased an acre of land from Henry Walton beside Congress Spring and hired carpenters to build the first hotel of Saratoga Springs. Completed and opened in 1803, the three-story guesthouse was named "Putnam's Tavern and Boarding House", though designated "Putnam's Folly" by locals for its "pretentiousness" and his "optimism and ambition". The guesthouse was rather conspicuous, for the entire area was blanketed in wilderness. At the time, the village comprised "a few log cabins, and the visitors were all invalids". New settlers in the area had the opportunity to buy plots of Putnam's property, and they instantly sold out. A couple years later, Putnam expanded the hotel, including a parlor, dining room, and ballroom. The guesthouse's name was later changed to "Union Hall". It was owned by Putnam's progeny until 1864, when it was sold to the Leland Brothers, who renamed it "Grand Union" in 1869.

=== Planning the village ===
On his map, which is now extant, Broad street is laid out in front of Union Hall, one hundred and twenty feet in width....At the time he made his map there were three springs discovered near Union Hall. The Congress, Columbian, and the Hamilton. Putnam so laid out his village that each of these springs was left in a public street....Broadway extended south far enough to bring within it the Columbian spring. Congress street he laid out sixty-six feet wide, and this left the Congress spring near the centre of the street, and therefore public property. The Hamilton spring was also left by Gideon Putnam far in the street....Gideon Putnam also contemplated laying out a large public park, to be forever free to the public.

— Nathaniel Bartlett Sylvester, History of Saratoga County, New York, with Illustrations Biographical Sketches of Some of Its Prominent Men and Pioneers

In 1805, Putnam purchased more land from Walton—130 acres adjacent to the acre he had originally purchased near Congress Spring—and began to allocate the area. On the west side of the land, he arranged a village, which was to have broad roads, with the springs in the center. The springs were to be public—"forever remain open and free to the people". The southwest area was "set aside ... for a cemetery, which he later gave to the village, and he also provided land for a church of whichever denomination was established first". The Baptists were the first to build a church there. Putnam also had a plot for a school, and planted poplars alongside Broad street.

=== Springs ===
Putnam uncovered and tubed several mineral springs: in 1806, Washington Spring, in 1805, Columbian Spring, Hamilton Spring (named after Alexander Hamilton, son-in-law of Philip Schuyler, who was an earlier settler of Saratoga), and lastly, in 1809, Congress Spring. Gradually, more newcomers began visiting the village, so "to accommodate whom he built a bath house near the present Congres[s] Spring". Inhabitants of nearby Ballston came to eat dinner with Putnam and drink from Congress Spring. In 1811, seeing the success of the hotel, Putnam decided to build another one, which later became Congress Hall.

== Death ==
While overseeing the construction of the future Congress Hall, Putnam fell off the scaffolding and broke some ribs. On December 1, 1812, at the age of 49, he died of a lung disease complication and pneumonia. It is said that some guests have seen the ghost of Mr. Putnam roaming the halls of the hotel. He was the first to be buried in Putnam's Cemetery, which he had himself laid out.

== Legacy ==
Putnam is the namesake of the Gideon Putnam Hotel in Saratoga Spa State Park.

Considering Putnam's accomplishments and contributions, in Our County and its People: a Descriptive and Biographical Record of Saratoga County, New York, George Baker Anderson concluded that "Gideon Putnam, though not the pioneer, was in reality the founder of the village of Saratoga Springs." He said, "To Gideon Putnam belongs the credit for starting the boom which made Saratoga Springs a formidable rival of the famous Ballston Spa, a movement which eventually gave to the former place the prestige and glory which originally accompanied the name of the latter. It was his capital which laid the foundations of the famed Grand Union hotel, and gave that village a name which it has ever since borne—the prince of watering places in America, and the peer of any in the world."

Richard L. Allen, Putnam's grand son-in-law, opined in An Analysis of the Principal Mineral Fountains at Saratoga Springs, "It was to Putnam that we are indebted, more than to any other individual for improvements at the Springs, during this period of its history. His enterprise and energy cleared away the forest trees from the adjacent plains, converted the rich pineries into materials and means for the further development of the town, erected public buildings for the accommodation of visitors, opened highways about the town, improved and laid out streets in the village; excavated, tubed and secured the mineral springs.... He was emphatically the man of his day in this locality, and he made such an impression on the place of his choice, that his name must be co-existent with the history of the village which his energy did so much to develop. He possessed a will which no ordinary obstacle could long withstand, and by his exertions the din and hum of civilization soon took the place of the deep and solemn murmur of the primitive pine forest."

Nathaniel Bartlett Sylvester declared in History of Saratoga County, New York, with Illustrations Biographical Sketches of Some of Its Prominent Men and Pioneers, "Gideon Putnam was in every sense a remarkable man. Possessed of indomitable perseverance, stern resolution, and invincible energy, he early encountered the trials and privations incident to a pioneer life, and carved out from the primitive forest one of the most beautiful villages in the country, and which has proved one of the most popular places of summer resort. Its broad streets, free fountains, and abundant religious and educational advantages bear testimony alike to his comprehensive ingenuity, his liberality, and his respect for truth. He not only gave the burial-ground to the village, but also the ground for the village academy, and to the Baptist church the ground on which it stands. He made such an impression on the place of his choice that his name must ever stand first among those whose early self-denials and energetic lives have conferred so much upon the village."

== Bibliography ==
- Allen, Richard L. (1858). An Analysis of the Principal Mineral Fountains at Saratoga Springs. Ross & Tousey.
- Anderson, George Baker (1899). Our County and its People: a Descriptive and Biographical Record of Saratoga County, New York. Boston History Company.
- Bradley, Hugh (1975). Such Was Saratoga. Ayer Publishing. ISBN 0-405-06901-4.
- Britten, Evelyn Barrett (1959). Chronicles of Saratoga: a Series of Articles.
- Corbett, Theodore (2001). The Making of American Resorts: Saratoga Springs, Ballston Spa, Lake George. New Brunswick, NJ: Rutgers University Press. ISBN 0-8135-2842-9.
- "Country Life". Country Life. 173. 1983.
- Gazetteer and Business Directory of Saratoga County, N.Y.: and Queensbury. Warren County, for 1871. Printed at the Journal office. 1871.
- "Geo". GEO. 2 (2). Gruner + Jahr. 1980.
- Holmes, Timothy (2008). Saratoga Springs, New York: A Brief History. The History Press. ISBN 978-1-59629-452-3.
- Hotaling, Edward (1995). They're Off!: Horse Racing at Saratoga. Syracuse, NY: Syracuse University Press. ISBN 0-8156-0350-9.
- Klopott, R. Beth (1999). American National Biography: Putman-Roush. New York: Oxford University Press. ISBN 0-19-512797-8.
- Livingston, William Farrand (1901). Israel Putnam: pioneer, ranger, and major-general, 1718–1790. New Brunswick, NJ: G. P. Putnam's Sons. ISBN 0-8135-2842-9.
- New York, a Guide to the Empire State (4 ed.). US History Publishers. 1949. ISBN 9781603540315.
- Proceedings of the Davenport Academy of Natural Sciences. Vol. 7. Davenport Academy of Natural Sciences. 1899.
- Putnam, Eben (1891). A History of the Putnam Family in England and America. Vol. 1. Salem Press Publishing and Printing Co. ISBN 9780598998705.
- Sterngass, Jon (2001). First Resorts: Pursuing Pleasure at Saratoga Springs, Newport, and Coney Island. Baltimore: JHU Press. ISBN 0-8018-6586-7.
- Sylvester, Nathaniel Bartlett (1878). History of Saratoga County, New York, with Illustrations Biographical Sketches of Some of Its Prominent Men and Pioneers. Philadelphia: Everts & Ensign.
- Taintor, Charles Newhall (1875). Saratoga Illustrated: the Visitor's Guide of Saratoga Springs. Taintor.
- John Fiske (1900). "Putnam, Israel" . In Wilson, J. G.; Fiske, J. (eds.). Appletons' Cyclopædia of American Biography. Vol. 5. New York: D. Appleton.
