= Rensselaer and Saratoga Railroad: Green Island Shops =

- U.S. National Register of Historic Places
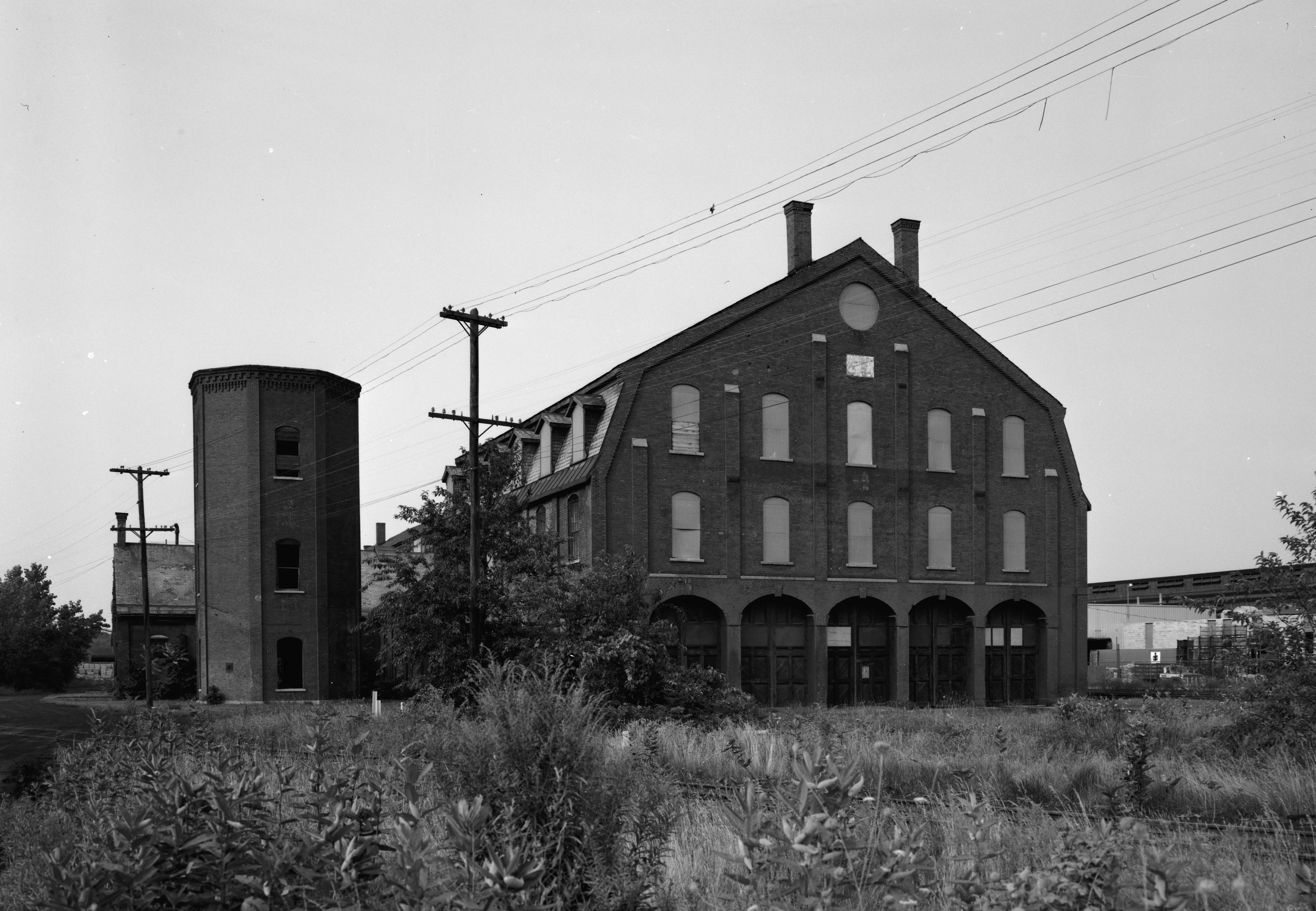

- Location within New York Location within the United States
- Location: James and Tibbits Streets and the Delaware and Hudson Railroad tracks, Green Island, New York
- Coordinates: 42°45′2″N 73°41′34″W
- Area: 10 acres (4.0 ha)
- Built: 1871
- NRHP reference No.: 73001161
- Added to NRHP: May 24, 1973

The Rensselaer and Saratoga Railroad: Green Island Shops were two historic buildings and one historic structure located at Green Island, Albany County, New York. The buildings were built in 1871 by the Rensselaer and Saratoga Railroad. They are: the three-story, five-bay, brick car shop building measuring approximately 100 by 300 feet (30 by 91 m); the one-story, semicircular, brick roundhouse; and the 40-foot-tall (12 m) octagonal water tower. The shops remained in operation into the late 1930s.

It was added to the National Register of Historic Places in 1973.

On March 3, 2011, the structure caught fire. The fire started on the third floor and quickly spread to the first. The building was demolished a few weeks later.

== See also ==
- National Register of Historic Places listings in Albany County, New York
