= Saratoga and Schenectady Railroad =

Map

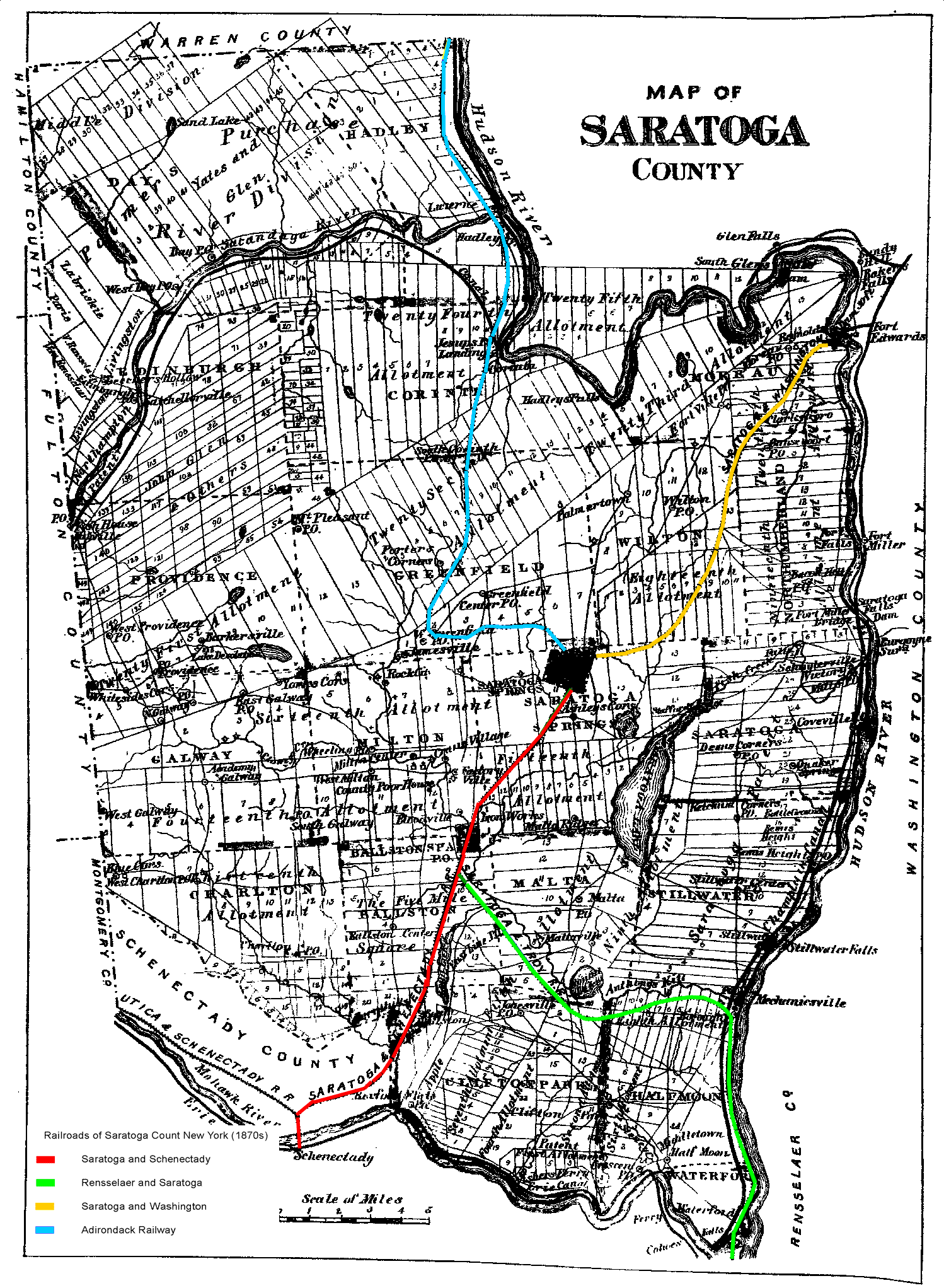
Railroad lines in Saratoga County before 1978 (Saratoga and Schenectady Railroad in red)

The Saratoga and Schenectady Railroad was incorporated on February 16, 1831. The founders were Henry Walton, John Clarke, William A. Langworthy, John H. Steele, Miles Beach, Gideon W. Davison, and Rockwell Putnam. The line was opened from Schenectady to Ballston Spa on July 12, 1832, and extended to Saratoga Springs in 1833 for a total of 20.8 miles (33.5 km). The Rensselaer and Saratoga Railroad leased the line on January 1, 1851, and the lease was reassigned to the Delaware and Hudson Canal Company on May 1, 1871.

Initially, most of the business of the line was passenger travel in the summer. It lost money until the Rensselaer and Saratoga Railroad and the Saratoga and Washington railroad linked it into a continuous line between the Hudson River and Lake Champlain by 1848.

== Rail trails ==
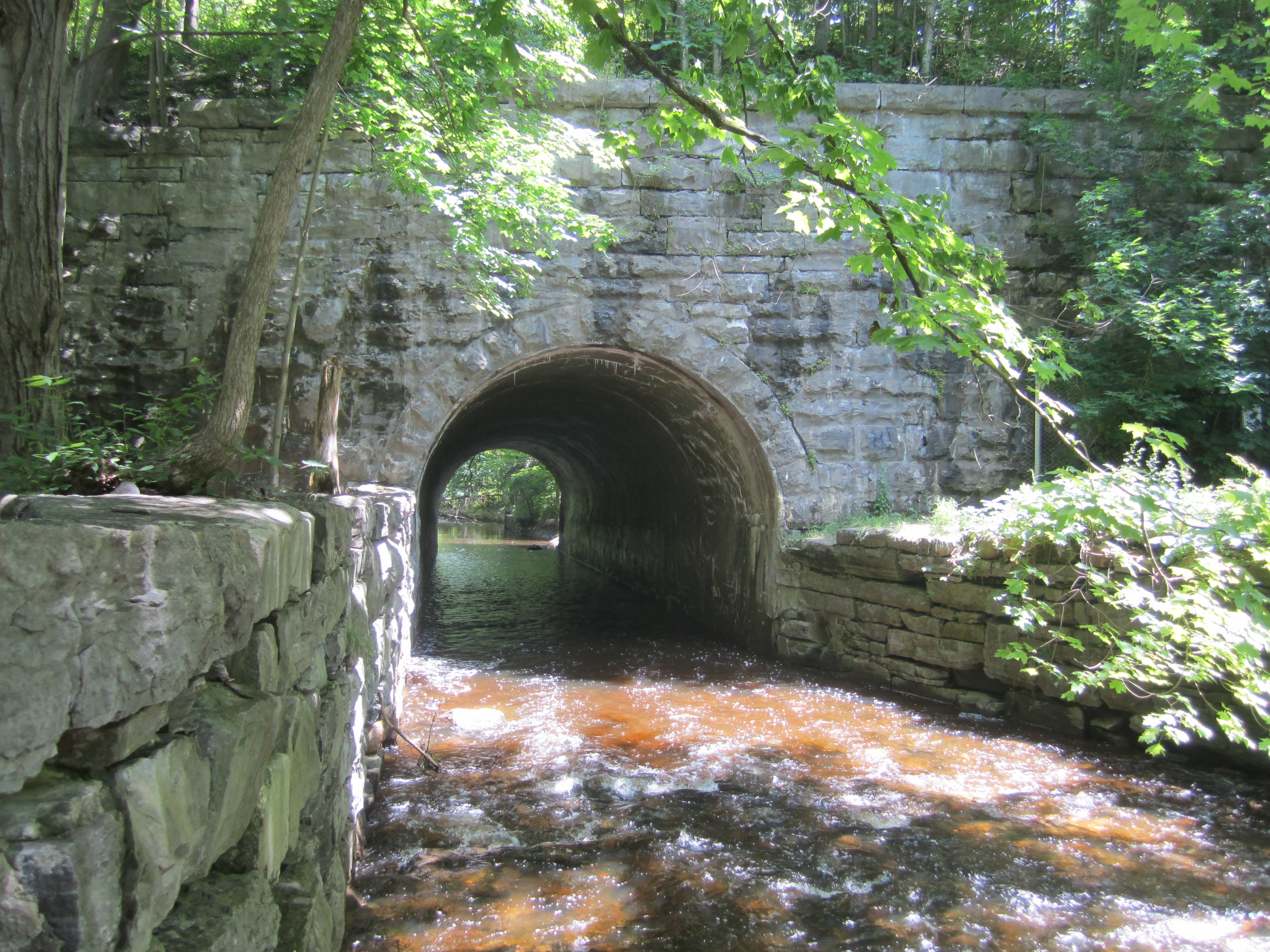
Saratoga and Schenectady Railroad bridge, Ballston Spa, NY

Much of the original right-of-way has been abandoned and adapted for recreation.

- The Ballston Veterans Bike Trail runs for 3.5 miles (5.6 km) along the west shore of Ballston Lake in the town of Ballston.
- Since 2005, the James Tedisco Fitness Trail follows the route of the Saratoga and Schenectady for approximately .5 miles (0.80 km) through the village of Ballston Spa from Front Street to Prospect Street.
- The Railroad Run trail in Saratoga Springs runs for .5 miles (0.80 km) between West Circular Street and Congress Avenue.
