= Harry Walton =

Harry Walton may refer to:

== People ==
- Harry Walton (writer), in Travelers of Space
- Harold Walton (cricketer), New Zealand cricketer

== Fiction ==
- Harry Walton's Success, book on List of works by Horatio Alger Jr.
- Harry Walton, character in Shuffle Along

== See also ==
- Henry Walton (disambiguation)
