= St. Mark's Episcopal Church (Green Island, New York) =

Historic church in New York, United States

- U.S. National Register of Historic Places
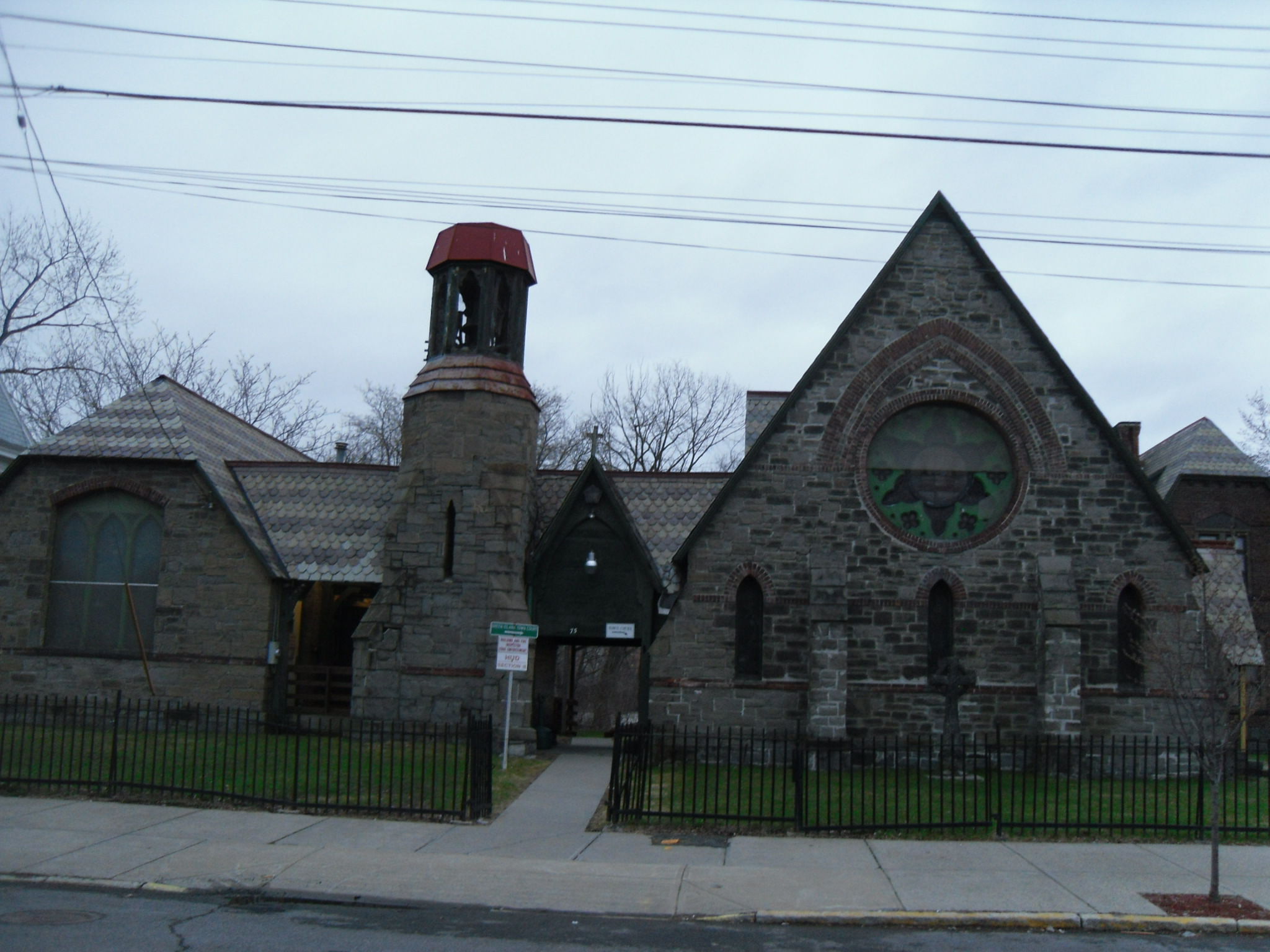
- St. Mark's Episcopal Church, March 2010

- Location within New York Location within the United States
- Location: 69-75 Hudson Ave., Green Island, New York
- Coordinates: 42°44′30″N 73°41′30″W
- Area: 0.5 acres (0.20 ha)
- Built: 1866
- Architect: Littel, Emlyn T.; Clarke, Otis
- Architectural style: Late Victorian, American Gothic Revival
- NRHP reference No.: 78001839
- Added to NRHP: November 7, 1978

St. Mark's Episcopal Church is a historic Episcopal church at 69-75 Hudson Avenue in Green Island, Albany County, New York. It was built in 1866–1867 in a Gothic Revival style. It is a rectangular, brick trimmed stone church building with a steeply pitched roof with three steeply pitched dormers, covered in polychrome slate. The front gable features three pointed Gothic windows and a rose window. It also has a stone bell tower. The two story brick rectory was added in 1883–1884.

It was listed on the National Register of Historic Places in 1978.
