= Sans Souci Hotel (Ballston Spa) =

Demolished hotel in New York, United States (1803–1887)

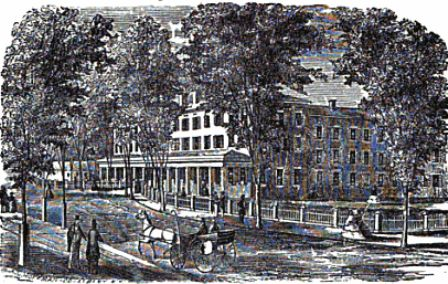
Sans Souci Hotel, Ballston Spa, New York. Hand colored.

The Sans Souci Hotel was a hotel located in Ballston Spa, Saratoga County, New York. It was built in 1803, closed as a hotel in 1849, and the building, used for other purposes, was torn down in 1887.

== Early history ==
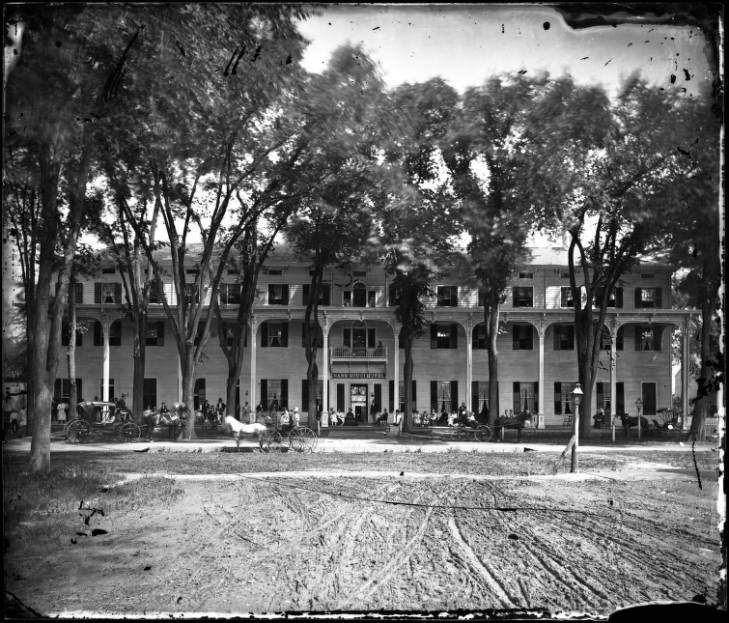
Sans Souci Hotel, Ballston Spa, NY (George P. Hall & Son, glass negative)

The Sans Souci Hotel was erected by Nicholas Low in 1803. It was designed by Joseph Newton, an architect from New York City. Low was a major property owner in Ballston Spa and had many commercial interests; the Sans Souci was only one of Low’s enterprises during the day. He hired Andrew Berger to run the hotel when it was completed in 1804. Low paid Berger $500 for the first year and $1,000 for the second year. Ballston Spa, like its neighboring town of Saratoga Springs, contained many mineral springs located throughout the town. Tourists came from early in the 18th century to enjoy the mineral waters. Low sought to capitalize on the tourist trade and opened the Sans Souci hotel as a destination resort. The building of the hotel was overseen by carpenter James Hawkins.

The hotel was 156 feet long with a wing extending back from each end at 150 feet, all of them three stories high and contained lodging for 250 people. This was an enormous structure during its day, rivaled only by Putnam’s Tavern and Boarding House (later the Grand Union Hotel in Saratoga Springs). The Sans Souci and the Grand Union Hotel had similar architectural styles in their beginnings, with plain white clapboard siding and dark shutters (“venetian blinds”) with a “verdigrise” (green) pigment. Both hotels were laid out in a “U” shape with an inner courtyard. The Sans Souci building and grounds occupied the entire block bounded by Front Street, Milton Avenue, Washington Street, and Spring Street. The Sans Souci’s large piazza was built at the same time as the hotel.

The first floor of the hotel had several parlors and a 70 x 30 ft ballroom. On the first floor of one wing were located several private parlors, and on the first floor of the other wing was the expansive dining room. A "temple" was added to the end of the east wing, which was two stories tall. The cost of the addition was $250. Low then added a similar addition to the end of the other wing of the hotel for a billiards room. Low rented the billiards tables out at $10 per day and backgammon at $6 per day. The front hall was hung with elegant chandeliers; live music played and balls were geld.

Cost in the first year for a stay at the Sans Souci was about $8 per day; poorer lodging in the Ballston Spa area could be found for $4 per week.

Eventually the hotel was expanded so that it had 162 feet (49 m) of frontage, the two wings 152 feet (46 m) deep. The hotel then had 180 rooms and accommodated 300 guests. A white picket fence wrapped around the property, bordering the sidewalks.

The hotel included many outbuildings, including a stable, wash house, manager’s home, small four-season hotel, bath house, billiards room, and a three-story outhouse that dumped waste into Gordon Creek.

Guests to the Sans Souci included some of the most elite members of politics and economy during the 19th century: Daniel Webster, Henry Clay, John C. Calhoun, Martin Van Buren, General John E. Wool, James Fenimore Cooper, Franklin Pierce, Commodore Isaac Hull, Commodore Stephen Decatur, Commodore Thomas Macdonough, Andrew Jackson, Stephen Douglas, William Seward, William L. Marcy, Edward Everett, Silas Wright, and Washington Irving. Joseph Bonaparte, the ex-king of Spain, stayed there in 1821.

The Sans Souci operated only in the summertime because of the expense of heating it during the off-season.

A travel journal from guests Mr. Elkanah Watson and Mr. Bayard in 1805 describes the hotel as follows: "We seated ourselves at a sumptuous table, with about a hundred guests of all classes, but generally, from their appearance and deportment, of first respectability, assembled here from every part of the Union and from Europe, in the pursuit of health and pleasure, or matrimony or vice. This is the most splendid watering place in America and is scarcely surpassed in Europe in its dimensions, and the taste and elegance of its arrangement. The building contains about one hundred apartments, all respectability furnished. The plan upon which it is constructed, the architecture, the style of the outbuildings and the gravel walks girded with shrubbery—are all on a magnificent scale… In the evening, we attended a ball in the spacious hall, brilliantly illuminated with chandeliers, and adorned with various other appliances of elegance and luxury. Here was congregated a fine exhibition of refinement of the beau monde… Instead of the old-fashioned country dances and four-hand reels of revolutionary days, I was pleased to notice the advance of refined customs, and the introduction of the graces of Paris… There was a large display of servants, handsomely attired, while the music of a choice band enlivened the occasion."

== Decline of the hotel ==
There are several reasons cited for the decline of the Sans Souci Hotel. The first was the business sense of the owner, Nicholas Low. A New York City native, Nicholas Low sought to import goods from merchants that he knew in New York City and servants from New York City. Very little of the money that the Sans Souci Hotel generated during its heyday was used to develop the village of Ballston Spa.

Low was a major landowner in Ballston Spa, and he leased out (99 year leases) most of the downtown area for commercial pursuits. Low saw that the town’s geographical area situated close to the Hudson River would be beneficial for manufacturing and then shipping goods down to New York City. Consequently, he built and leased out many factories and mills along the Kayderosseras Creek beginning in 1790, such as the “Blue Mill” which he sold to Hezekiah and Michael Middlebrook in 1792. While these were largely profitable to Low, it had a negative impact on the Sans Souci Hotel. The rich and elite did not care to spend their money and vacation time looking at the backs of factories and mingling with factory workers. That, combined with the success of the hotel industry in nearby Saratoga Springs, meant that most of the wealthy moved to the large hotels in Saratoga and abandoned the Sans Souci.

Another reason cited for the decline of the Sans Souci was the failing of the mineral springs. The springs were prone to block and stop flowing, and tapping into the waters was an expensive endeavor. Furthermore, Low sought to create a monopoly on the springs. Consequently, he arranged and subdivided his land so that the springs were only accessed by private homesteads; this is in contrast to the springs in Saratoga Springs which were frequently located in the middle of roadways and in parks, where they were free for the public to use and enjoy. The private nature of the springs in Ballston Spa was a deterrent to vacationers looking for the health benefits of the water.

A recession hit the upstate New York region in 1808 and 1809, and the Sans Souci saw significantly fewer guests that previous years. At the height of summer, the hotel only had 40 guests, which devastated Low.

== Law school (1849–1853) ==
In 1849 the Sans Souci Hotel was sold to John W. Fowler, who there established the State and National Law School in the hotel. The school opened with a faculty of eminent professors and secured a large student body. At the examination in 1849, Ex-president Martin Van Buren, Governor Hamilton Fish, Horace Greeley, and Henry Clay were present. Ex-present Tyler was present at the commencement of 1850. Chester Arthur was a student of the law school. The law school closed its doors after only three years of operation.

Only July 25, 1860, during the presidential nominee Stephen A. Douglas spoke to a large assembly on the piazza of the Sans Souci. He was introduced by Judge Scott.

== Ladies’ seminary and later years (1853–1887) ==
The hotel was again opened as a hotel under the direction of Richard Chase until it was sold to Reverend D. W. Smith of Galway Ladies’ Seminary for a women’s boarding school in 1863. It ran as a boarding school until 1886.

The hotel was opened a third time as a hotel and ran as such until 1887 when the property was purchased by Hon. Eugene F. O’Connor of New York.

== Demolition ==
The Sans Souci hotel was torn down in 1887 to make room for business blocks.
