= Henry Walton (American painter) =

American painter

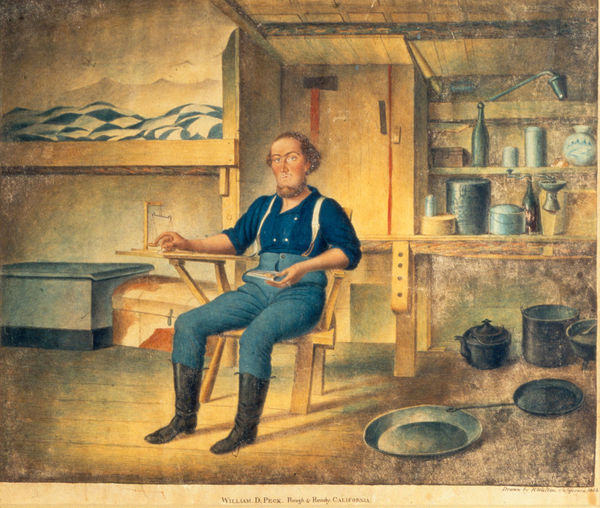
A Miner in His Cabin, Henry Walton, c. 1853, California

Henry Walton (1804–1865) was an American painter and lithographer active chiefly in Ithaca, New York and California.

== Biography ==
Walton was born in Saratoga Springs, New York in 1804, the son of Judge Henry Walton and Mathilda (Cruger) Yates.

He moved to Ithaca before 1836, where he is believed to have been working for a company republishing David Burr's 1829 Atlas of New York State. He produced both portraits and landscapes including View of Geneva (1837), Henry Clay (1844), Lithographic View of Jefferson (1847) (Jefferson is now Watkins Glen), and oil paintings of Addison (1850) and Painted Post (1851).

In 1840, during his stay in Ithaca, he was involved in a dispute over a portrait of William Henry Harrison, which political opponents claimed was actually a portrait of Andrew Jackson over which Walton had written the name Harrison.

In 1851 he joined the California Gold Rush, arriving in San Francisco on the steamer Oregon. In California he continued producing artistic works such as the watercolor View of Grass Valley (1857), and presumably other works which have been lost.

In 1857 he moved to Michigan, where he died in Cassopolis 1865. His wife Jane Orr died there in 1890. There is no record of children.

== Art work and career ==
His early works include lithographs of scenes from Saratoga Springs, Flat Rock Spring and the Pavilion Hotel. His First works were thought to be in 1820. Henry Walton also did portraits. He worked in the Finger Lakes area for a time where he engraved for the Stone and Clark firm. Walton's work can be seen in New York, Virginia, and Vermont.
