= Rensselaer and Saratoga Railroad =

American railway company

Map

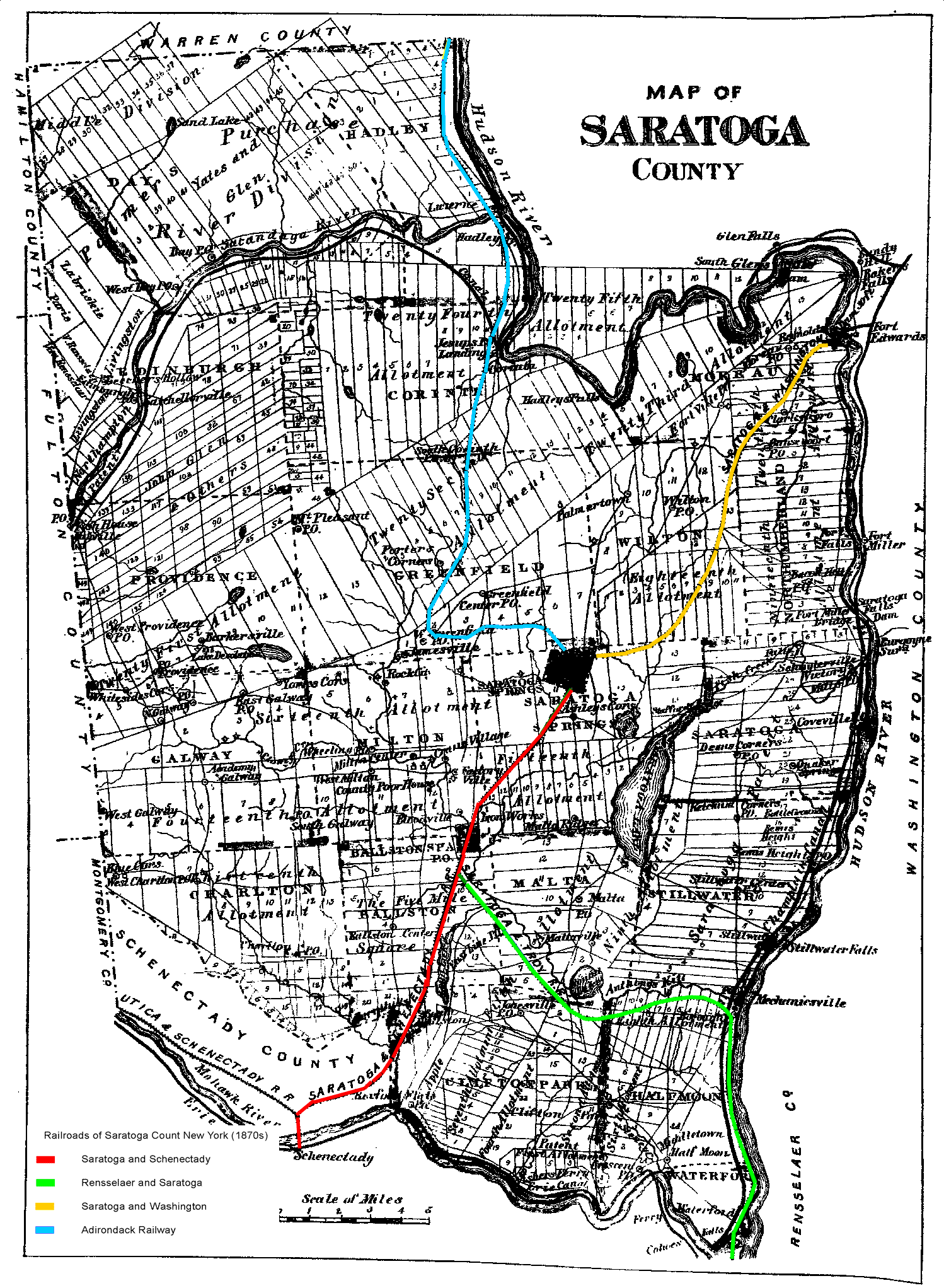
Railroad lines in Saratoga County before 1978 (Rensselaer and Saratoga in green)

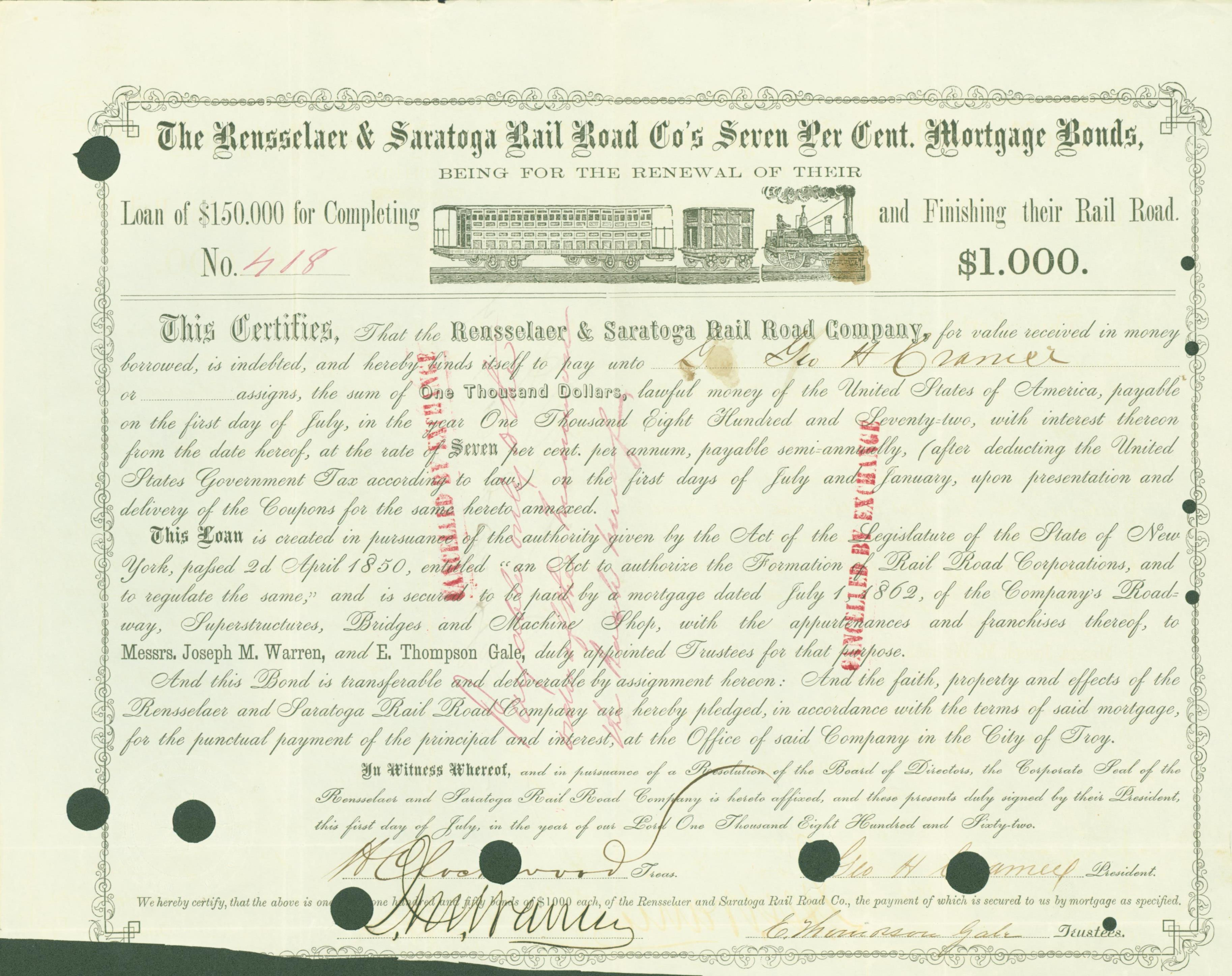
Mortgage Bond of the Rensselaer and Saratoga Rail Road Company, issued 1 july 1862

The Rensselaer and Saratoga Railroad was a railway company that operated in the states of New York and Vermont in the 19th century. At its peak it controlled a 150-mile (240 km) network. The Delaware and Hudson Railway leased the company in 1871 and formally merged it in 1945.

== History ==
The Rensselaer and Saratoga Railroad was chartered on April 14, 1832. It completed 25.2 miles (40.6 km) between Troy and Ballston Spa on March 19, 1836.

The railroad was largely conceived and built by businessmen of Troy in response to Albany's construction of the Mohawk and Hudson Railroad and the extension to Saratoga called the Saratoga and Schenectady Railroad. Despite its name, the railroad only reached to Ballston Spa and relied on the Saratoga and Schenectady to give it access to Saratoga Springs, New York. When an agreement was not forthcoming, investors seized an opportunity to buy up Saratoga and Schenectady stock and take control of the railroad.

Later acquisitions included trackage to Whitehall, New York and a line of steamers that plied Lake Champlain, allowing tourists to travel from Troy to Canada entirely by steam conveyance for the first time. The last expansion before the merger with the Delaware and Hudson Canal Company involved building new sections of track between Green Island and Watervliet that linked Albany and Troy for the first time. All of the leases, purchases, and road construction carried out by the Rensselaer and Saratoga resulted in a little railroad empire consisting of 175 miles of track and control of the Upper Hudson and Champlain Valleys.

The Green Island Shops were built in 1871. The Delaware and Hudson Canal Company leased the line on May 1, 1871, and it was consolidated into the Delaware and Hudson Railroad effective January 30, 1945.

== Bibliography ==
- From the Coalfields to the Hudson: A History of the Delaware & Hudson Canal, Larry Lowenthal (2009)
- Shaughnessy, Jim (1997) [1982]. Delaware & Hudson. Syracuse, NY: Syracuse University Press. ISBN 0-8156-0455-6. OCLC 36008594.
- Early Railroads of New York's Capital District, Timothy Starr (2011)
- Interstate Commerce Commission, State of New York (1926)
- Moody's Transportation Manual (1984)
