= Henry Walton (judge) =

American judge (1768–1844)

Henry Walton (1768–1844) was a judge, early landowner, and hotel owner who played a significant role in the development of Saratoga Springs, New York in the early 1800s.

Walton was born in New York City on October 8, 1768, the son of Jacob and Mary (Cruger) Walton. The Waltons were a prominent New York City family. Educated in England, Walton returned to New York in about 1788 and studied law under Aaron Burr. In 1790 he moved to Ballston, New York. There he served as surrogate court judge, where he was known as Judge Henry Walton.

In 1815 he built a mansion called Pine Grove on Broadway in Saratoga Springs, New York, across from the present City Center. This property was sold in 1823 to Chancellor Reuben Hyde Walworth and was later inherited by Walworth's daughter-in-law Ellen Hardin Walworth. In 1816, Walton built the estate he called "Wood Lawn," which he sold to Henry Hilton.

Walton was a large land owner in the area, and donated land for the First Presbyterian Church, the Universalist Church, and the Methodist Church in Saratoga Springs.

In 1819 he built the Pavilion Hotel on Broadway, on the site of the present City Hall. The hotel burned down around 1840 and was not rebuilt. He was also involved in developing the famous springs of Saratoga, tubing the Flat Rock Spring, and the President, later called the Iodine and the Saratoga Star Spring.

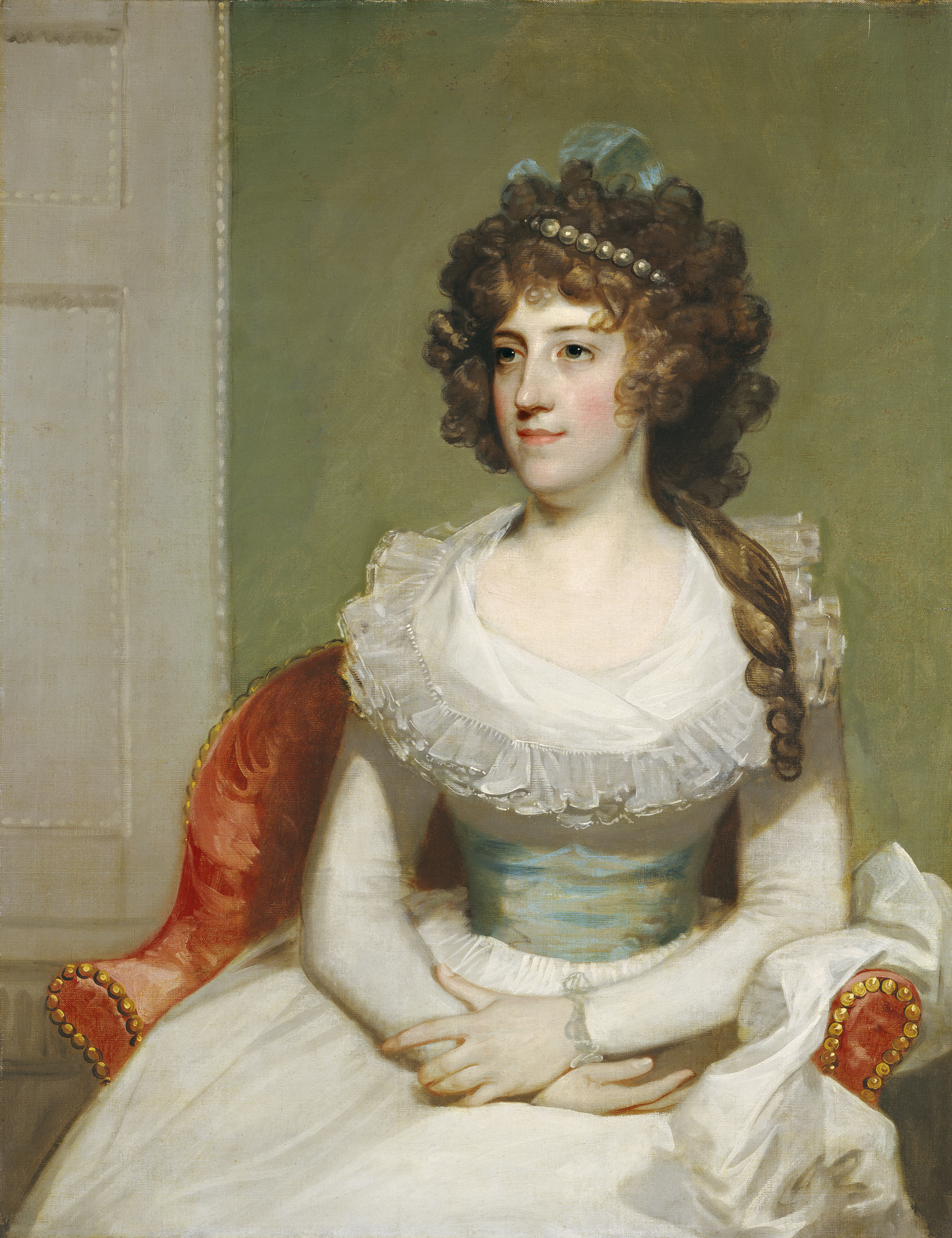
Matilda Caroline Cruger Yates Walton

He was married first to Pernette Sara de Maffe, who died in 1798. In 1800 he married Mrs. Matilda (or Mathilda) (Cruger) Yates (1776–-1812), by whom he had Jacob, Mary, Henry (1806–1865), Jared, Cruger, Mathilda, and William Henry. His son Henry later became a well-known artist in Ithaca, New York. Walton's third wife was Mrs. Margaret Kearney (1787–1853), by whom he had Susan, Jared, and Susan K.

Henry Walton died in New York City on September 15, 1844, and is buried in the Trinity churchyard.
