= National Museum of Dance and Hall of Fame =

Museum in Saratoga Springs, New York, United States

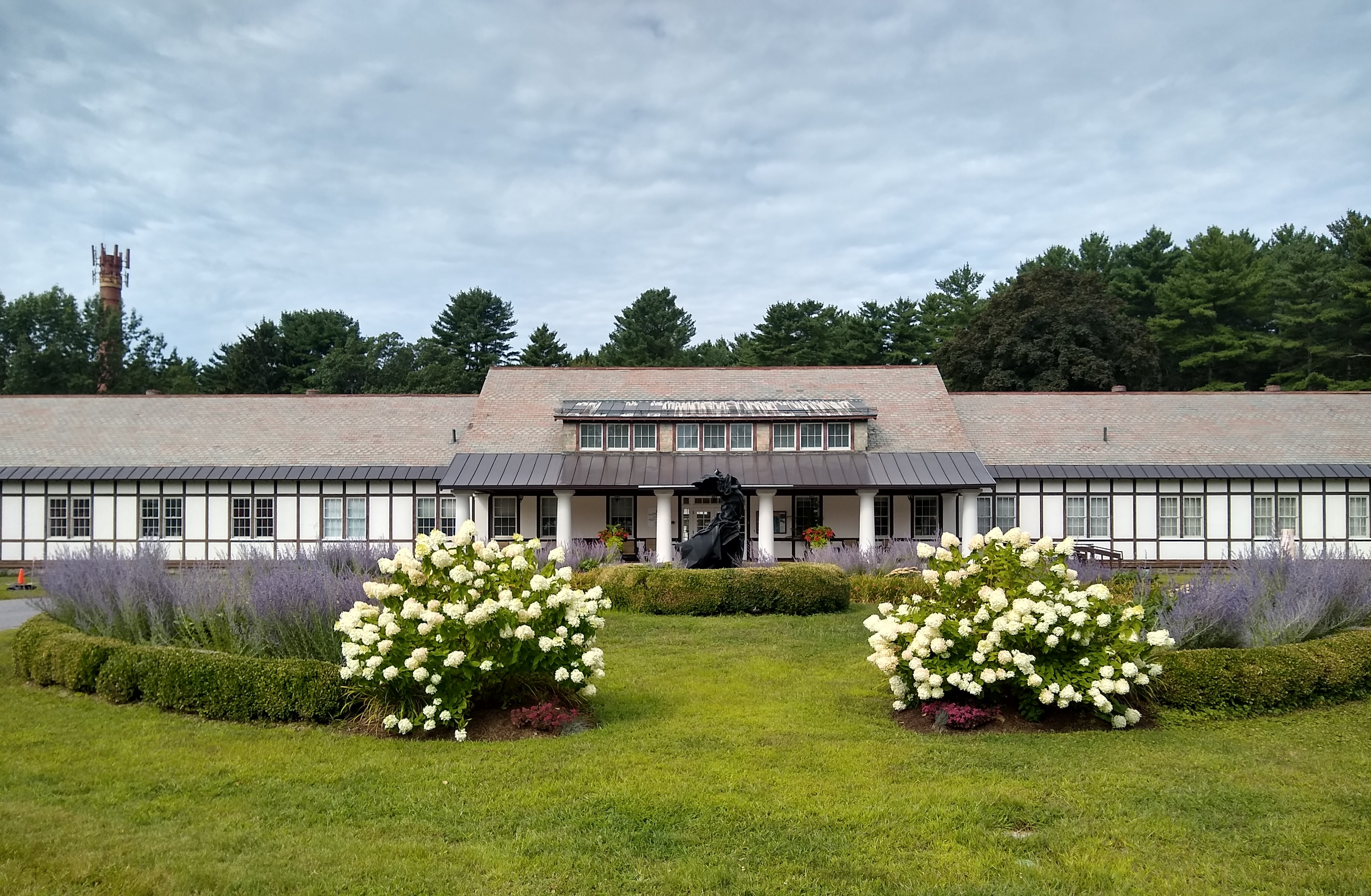
- The front entrance of the National Museum of Dance and Hall of Fame
- Established: 1986
- Location: Saratoga Springs, New York, United States
- Coordinates: 43.0660904°N 73.7902644°W
- Founders: Marylou Whitney, Cornelius Vanderbilt Whitney, Lewis A. Swyer
- Director: 2014-2017 Raul Martinez
- President: Michele Riggi
- Website: www.nationalmuseumofdance.org

The National Museum of Dance and Hall of Fame, in the Saratoga Spa State Park, Saratoga Springs, New York, was established in 1986. It has been indefinitely closed since March 2020 since the pandemic-forced shutdown. The museum contains photographs, videos, artifacts, costumes, and biographies. The museum is located in the former Washington Bath House and was founded by Marylou Whitney. It is related to the Saratoga Performing Arts Center and provided dance classes and master classes through the Lewis A. Swyer School for the Arts, which hosted the New York State Summer School of the Arts during July and August.

The National Museum of Dance and Hall of Fame purposed a mission from its very foundation. It was "to cultivate, promote, foster, sponsor, and develop among its members and the community at large, the appreciation, understanding, taste, and love of the Musical Arts, especially the Dance; to create a National Hall of Fame for the advancement of such purposes; to secure the interest of the patrons of these Arts, and to promote and encourage the means for popular instruction and enjoyment thereof."

== Mr. & Mrs. Cornelius Vanderbilt Whitney Hall of Fame ==
The Mr. & Mrs. Cornelius Vanderbilt Whitney Hall of Fame collection was provided to the Museum in 1987. The Hall of Fame annually inducts individuals from the dance world.

=== Inductees ===
List of the inductees into the Mr. & Mrs. Cornelius Vanderbilt Whitney Hall of Fame of the National Museum of Dance (United States).

1987 Inductees
Fred Astaire (1899–1987)
George Balanchine (1904–1983)
Agnes de Mille (1905–1993)
Isadora Duncan (1877 or 1878?–1927)
Katherine Dunham (1909–2006)
Martha Graham (1894–1991)
Doris Humphrey (1895–1958)
Lincoln Kirstein (1907–1996)
Catherine Littlefield (1905–1951)
Bill "Bojangles" Robinson (1878–1949)
Ruth St. Denis (1877–1968)
Ted Shawn (1891–1972)
Charles Weidman (1901–1975)

1988 Inductees
Busby Berkeley (1895–1976)
Lucia Chase (1897–1986)
Hanya Holm (1898–1992)
John Martin (1893–1992)
Antony Tudor (1908–1987)

1989–1999 Inductees
Jerome Robbins (1918–1998)
Alvin Ailey (1931–1989)
Merce Cunningham (1919–2009)
Bronislava Nijinska (1891–1972)
Paul Taylor (1930–2018)
José Limón (1908–1972)
Anna Sokolow (1910–2000)
Barbara Karinska (1886–1983)
Arthur Mitchell (1934–2018)

2000–2010 Inductees
Robert Joffrey (1930–1988)
Trisha Brown (1936–2017)
Alwin Nikolais (1910–1993)
Nicholas Brothers (1914–2006 & 1921–2000)
Léonide Massine (1896–1979)
Edwin Denby (1903–1983)
Igor Stravinsky (1882–1971)
Arthur and Kathryn Murray
The New Dance Group 1932
Bob Fosse (1927–1987)
Bill T. Jones (1952–)
Peter Martins (1946–)
Tommy Tune (1939–)
Marge Champion (1919–2020)
Suzanne Farrell (1945–)
Edward Villella (1936–)
Frankie Manning (1914–2009)
Michael Jackson (1958–2009)

2011–2012 Inductees
Frederic Franklin (1914–2013)
Oliver Smith (1918–1994)
Ben Vereen (1946–)

2012–2013 Inductees
Anna Pavlova (1881–1931)
Judith Jamison (1943–2024)

2013–2014 Inductees
Gene Kelly (1912–1996)
Jacques d'Amboise (1934–2021)

2014–2015 Inductees
Rudolf Nureyev (1938–1993)
Mark Morris (1956–)

2015–2016 Inductees
Gregory Hines (1946–2003)
Patricia Wilde (1928–2021)

2017 Inductees
Lewis A. Swyer (1918–1988)
Marylou Whitney (1925–2019)

2018 Inductees
Alfredo Corvino (1916–2005)
Lucinda Childs (1940–)

2019 Inductees
Carmen de Lavallade (1931–2025)
Sir Frederick Ashton (1904–1988)

== See also ==
- Dance Music Hall of Fame
