= Saratoga Springs, New York =

Saratoga Springs
- City
- City of Saratoga Springs
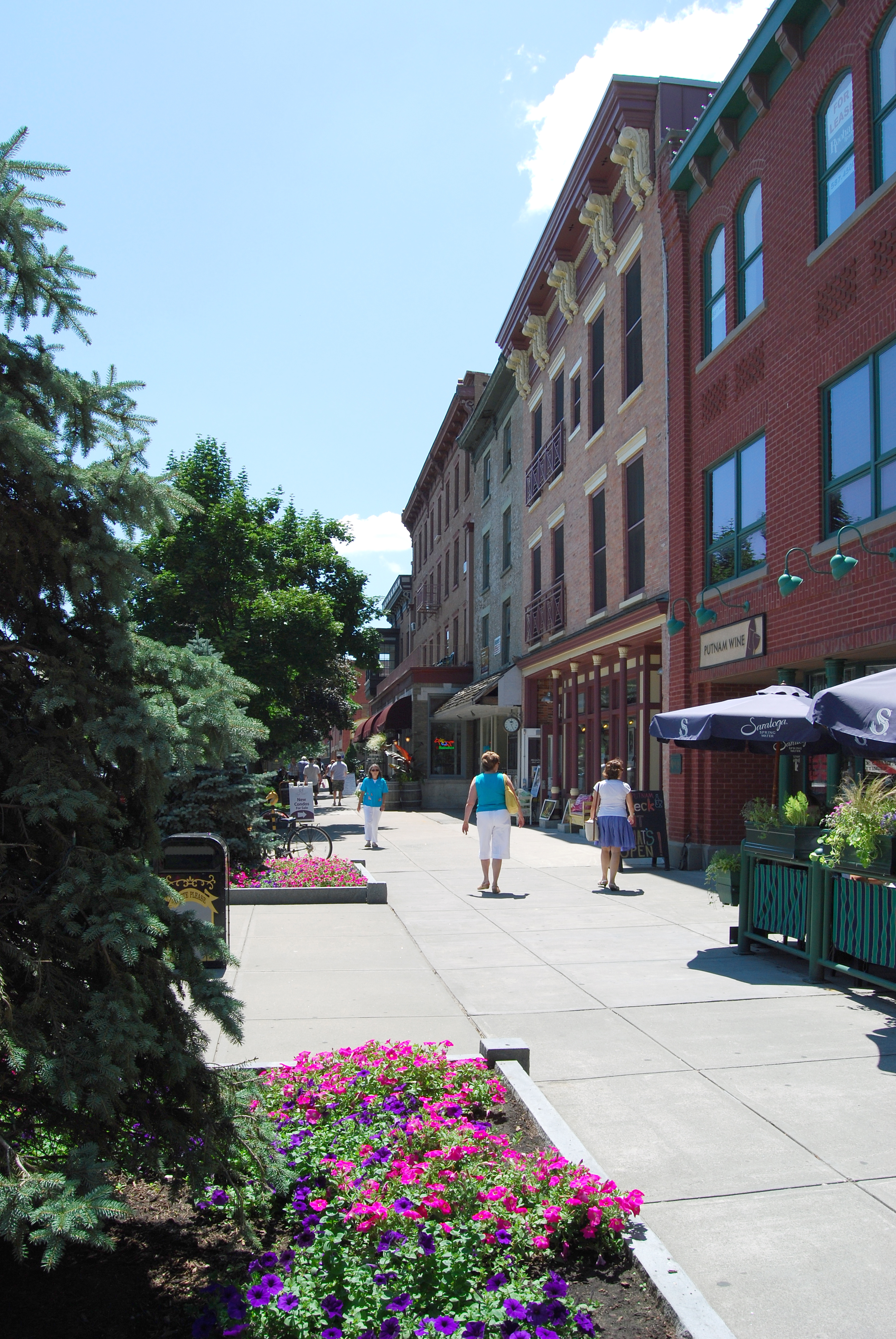
- A view of downtown, looking south along Broadway from where it intersects with Caroline Street

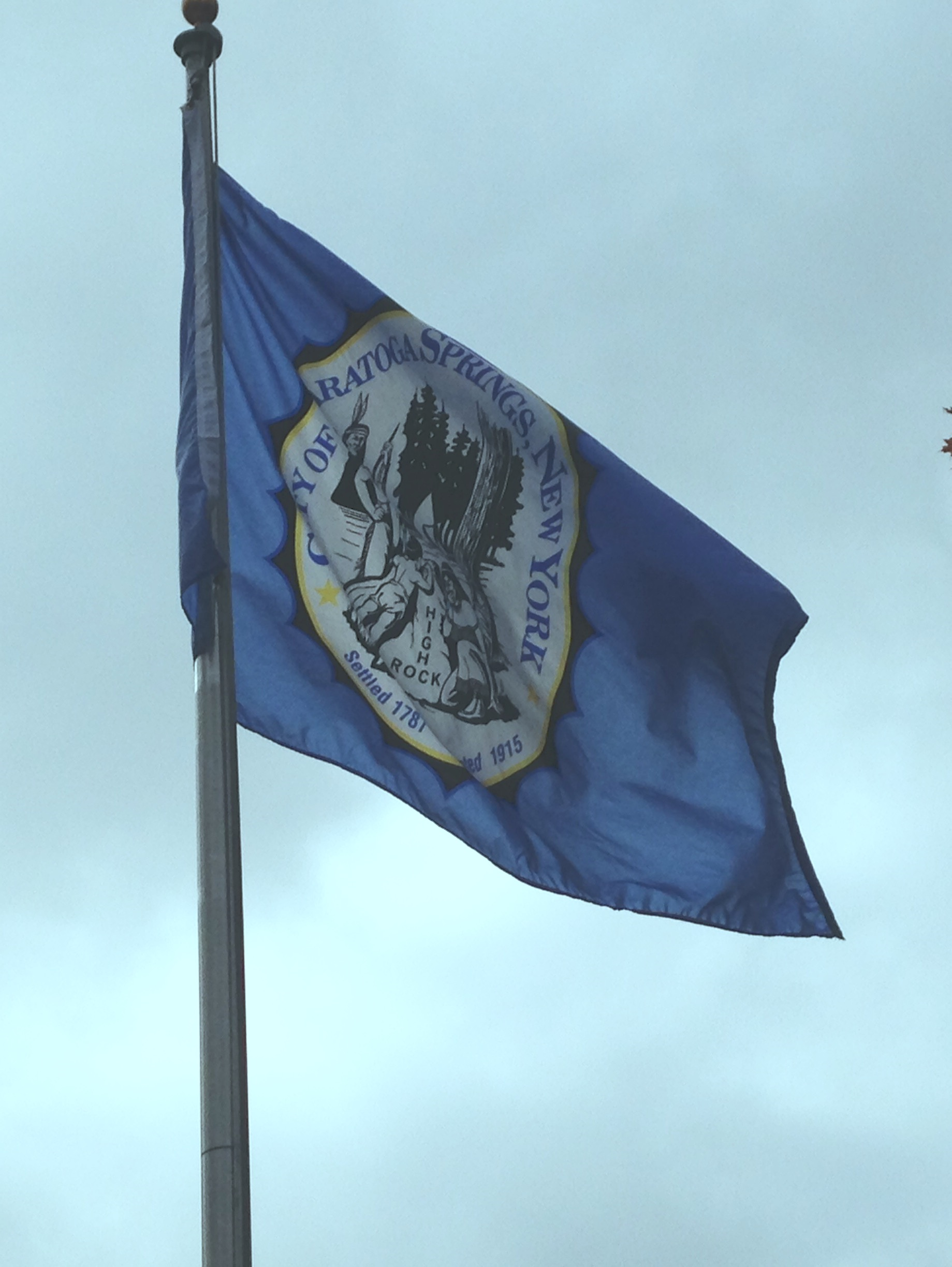
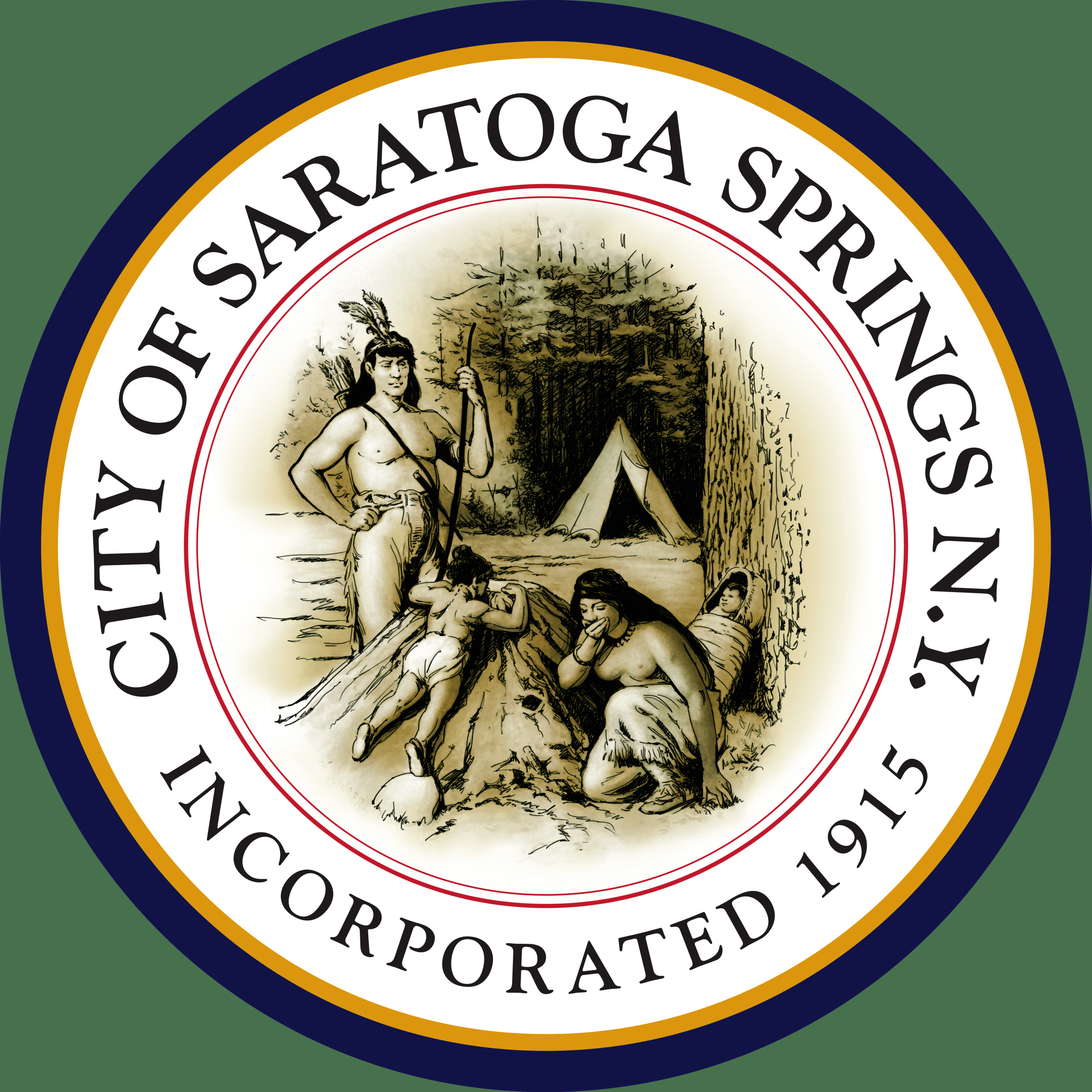
- Flag Seal
- Nicknames: The Spa City, 'Toga, The Springs.
- Motto: Health, History, Horses
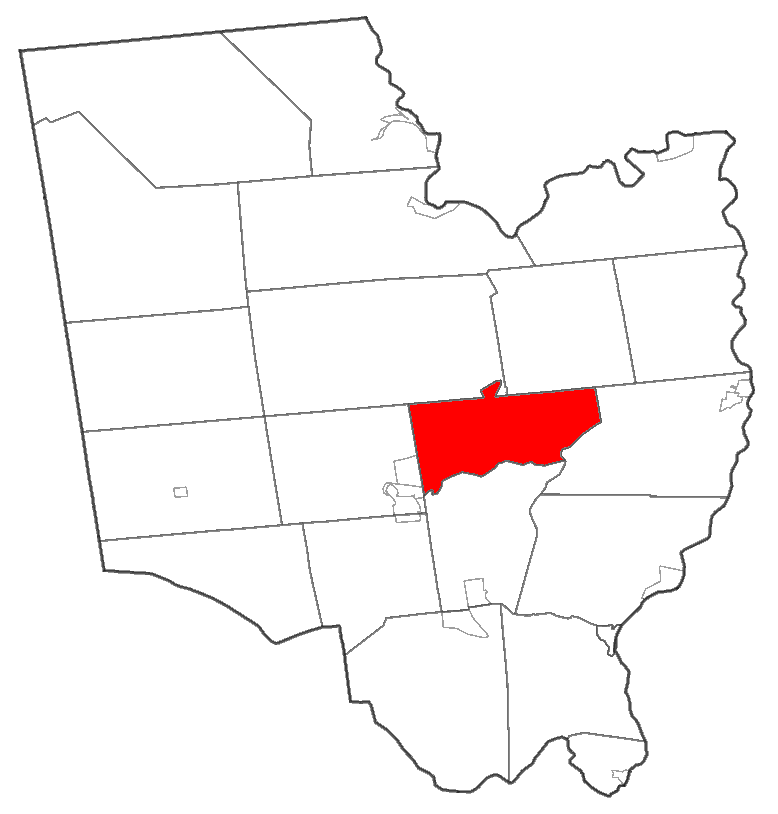
- Location of Saratoga Springs within Saratoga County, New York

- Location in the State of New York Location in the United States
- Coordinates: 43°04′59″N 73°47′04″W
- Country: United States
- State: New York
- County: Saratoga
- Founded: c. 1776
- Named for: Seratà:ke (Mohawk language for "on your heel")

Government
  - Type: Mayor-Commission
  - Mayor: John Safford (R)

Area
  - Total: 28.87 sq mi (74.78 km^{2})
  - Land: 28.07 sq mi (72.69 km^{2})
  - Water: 0.81 sq mi (2.09 km^{2})
- Elevation: 305 ft (93 m)
- Lowest elevation: 0 ft (0 m)

Population (2020)
  - Total: 28,491
  - Density: 1,015.2/sq mi (391.97/km^{2})
- Time zone: UTC−5 (EST)
  - Summer (DST): UTC−4 (EDT)
- ZIP Codes: 12866
- Area code: 518 838
- FIPS code: 36-091-65255
- FIPS code: 36-65255
- GNIS feature ID: 964489
- Wikimedia Commons: Saratoga Springs, New York
- Website: saratoga-springs.org

Saratoga Springs is a city in Saratoga County, New York, United States. The population was 28,491 at the 2020 census. The name reflects the presence of mineral springs in the area, which has made Saratoga a popular resort destination for over 200 years. It is home to the Saratoga Race Course, a thoroughbred horse racing track operated by the New York Racing Association, and Saratoga Performing Arts Center, a music and dance venue. The city's official slogan is "Health, History, and Horses".

== History ==
=== Early history of the area ===
The Mohawk indigenous people used the area that is now Saratoga Springs as prime hunting ground. Some thought of the mineral springs as a gift from Manitou.

The British built Fort Saratoga in 1691 on the west bank of the Hudson River. During the early part of the 1700s, settlers from Europe began to develop the area. Shortly thereafter, British colonists settled the current village of Schuylerville approximately one mile south; it was known as Saratoga until 1831.

In 1767, William Johnson, a colonial British officer who was a hero of the French and Indian War, was brought by Native American friends to the spring to treat his war wounds. (In 1756, Johnson had been appointed British Superintendent of Indian Affairs in the Northeast region due to his success in building alliances with the Mohawk and other Iroquois nations. He had learned the language and created many trading relationships. He achieved great wealth from trading and landholdings, and was knighted for his service to the Crown with the Iroquois.)

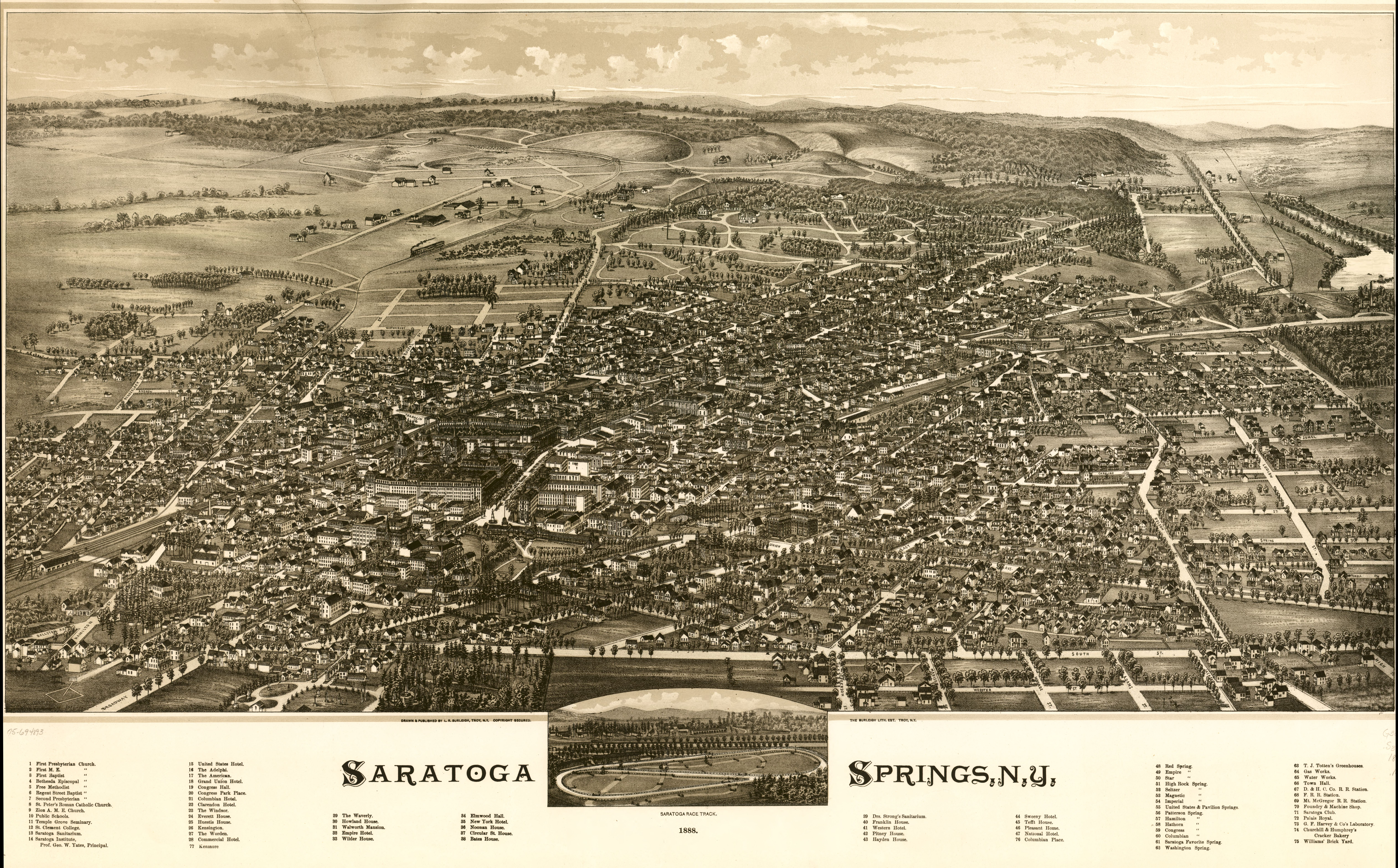
Perspective map of Saratoga Springs with image of racetrack inset and list of landmarks from 1888 by L.R. Burleigh

The first permanent European-American settler built a dwelling in the area circa 1776. The springs attracted tourists, and Gideon Putnam built the first hotel for travelers. Putnam also laid out the roads and donated land for use as public spaces.

The Battles of Saratoga, the turning point of the Revolutionary War, did not take place in Saratoga Springs. Rather, the battlefield is 15 miles (24 km) to the southeast, in the Town of Stillwater. A museum dedicated to the two battles sits on the former battlefields. The British encampment before the surrender at Saratoga took place 10 miles (16 km) east of the city, in Schuylerville, where several historical markers delineate points of interest. The surrender of the sword of battle took place where Fort Saratoga had been, south of Schuylerville.

Saratoga Springs was established as a settlement in 1819 from a western portion of the Town of Saratoga. Its principal community was incorporated as a village in 1826, and the entire region became a city in 1915.

=== Saratoga Springs becomes a tourist destination ===
Tourism was greatly aided by the 1832 arrival of the Saratoga and Schenectady Railroad, which brought thousands of travelers to the famous mineral springs and the resort hotels built to accommodate them. Patronage of the railroad increased after the Delaware and Hudson Canal Company assumed control in 1870 and began running the Empire State Express directly between New York City and the resort.

In the 19th century, doctor Simon Baruch encouraged the development of European-style spas in the United States as centers for health. Due to the presence of mineral waters Saratoga Springs was developed as a spa resort, spurring the construction of several hotels, including the United States Hotel and the Grand Union Hotel. The latter was, in its day, the largest hotel in the world. By 1870, Saratoga Springs was considered a top upscale resort.

These spa resorts had drawn gentlemen gamblers even before the Saratoga Race Course opened in 1863. The race track drew even more gamblers and visitors in general at a time when horse racing was one of the nation's most popular spectator sports.

John Morrissey, one of the partners who built the Saratoga Race Course, went on to open the Saratoga Clubhouse, or, more simply, The Club House, in either 1861 or 1866 or 1870. The casino, renamed the Canfield Casino after James Canfield purchased it and remodeled it along the lines of the gambling houses of Monaco, attracted such notable guests as Chester A. Arthur, Rutherford B. Hayes, Ulysses S. Grant, Cornelius Vanderbilt, John D. Rockefeller, and Mark Twain.

Local authorities mostly tolerated these casinos until 1907 when, after years of campaigning from moral crusaders such as Anthony Comstock and pressure from local authorities, Canfield sold the casino to the City, which converted it into a museum.

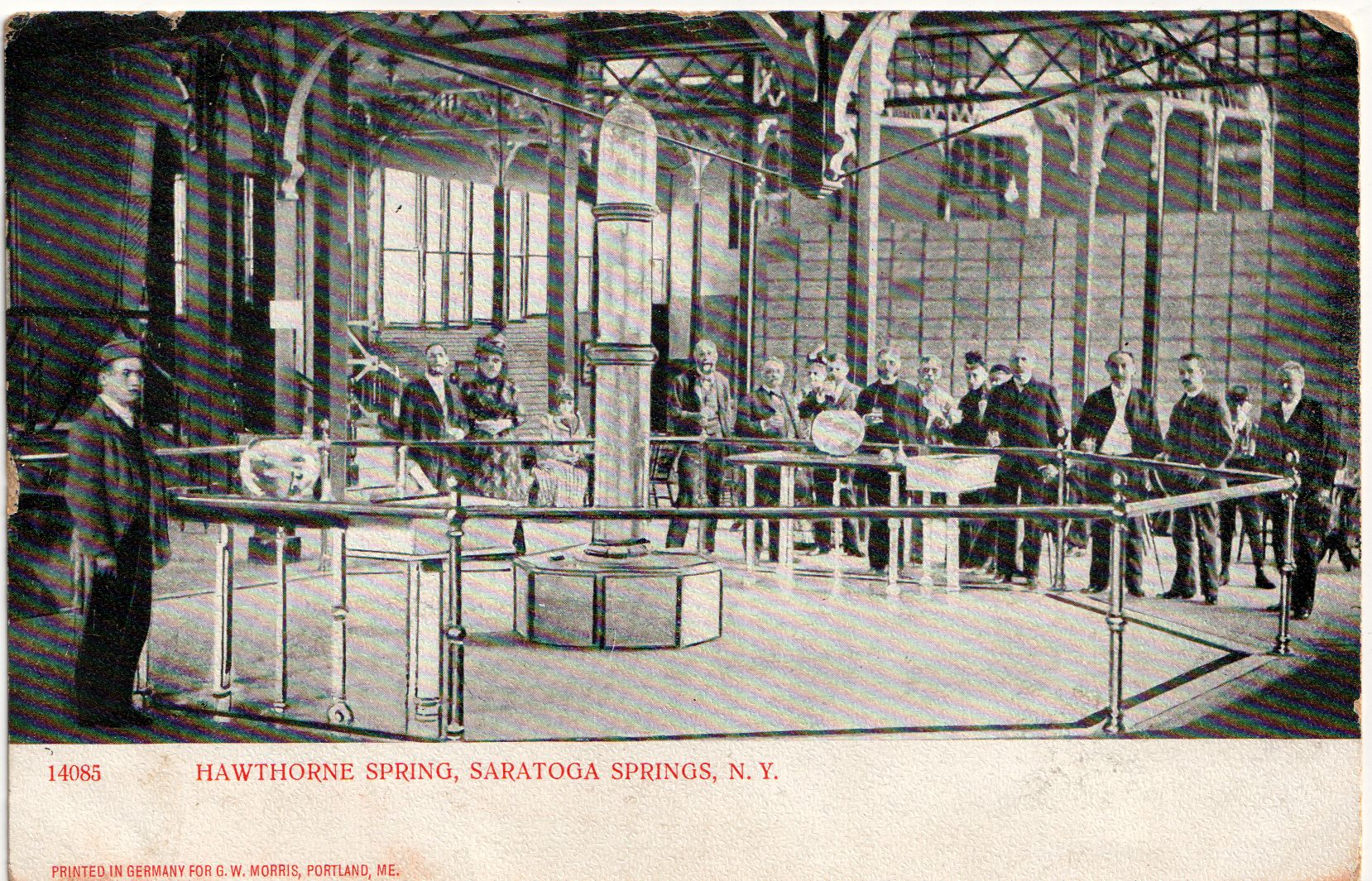
Hawthorne Spring in Saratoga Springs in the early 20th century

The Saratoga Springs area was also known for its lake houses, hotels and restaurants located on Saratoga Lake. When first established in the Nineteenth Century these venues offered fine dining in a country atmosphere a short excursion out of town.

=== Gambling returns ===
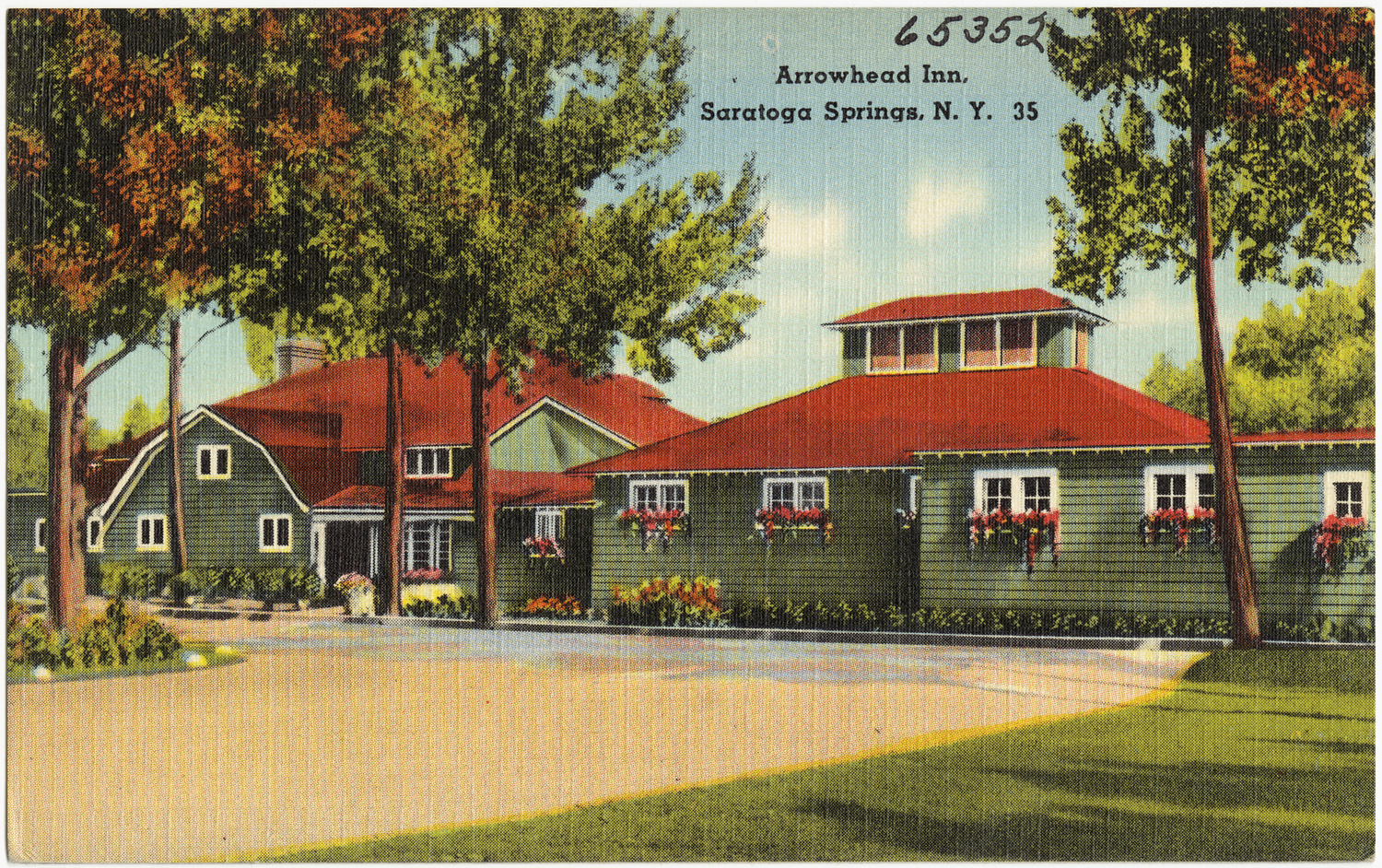
Arrowhead Inn

A decade after Saratoga Springs shut down its most prominent gambling venues in 1907, organized crime figures began bringing illegal gambling back, beginning in 1917 when notorious gambler Arnold Rothstein opened the Arrowhead Inn after bribing local officials. He opened a second casino and hotel, The Brook Resort, in 1921. Prominent gangsters Charles "Lucky" Luciano, Meyer Lansky and Dutch Schultz all worked for Rothstein at The Brook at various times during the Prohibition era of the 1920s.

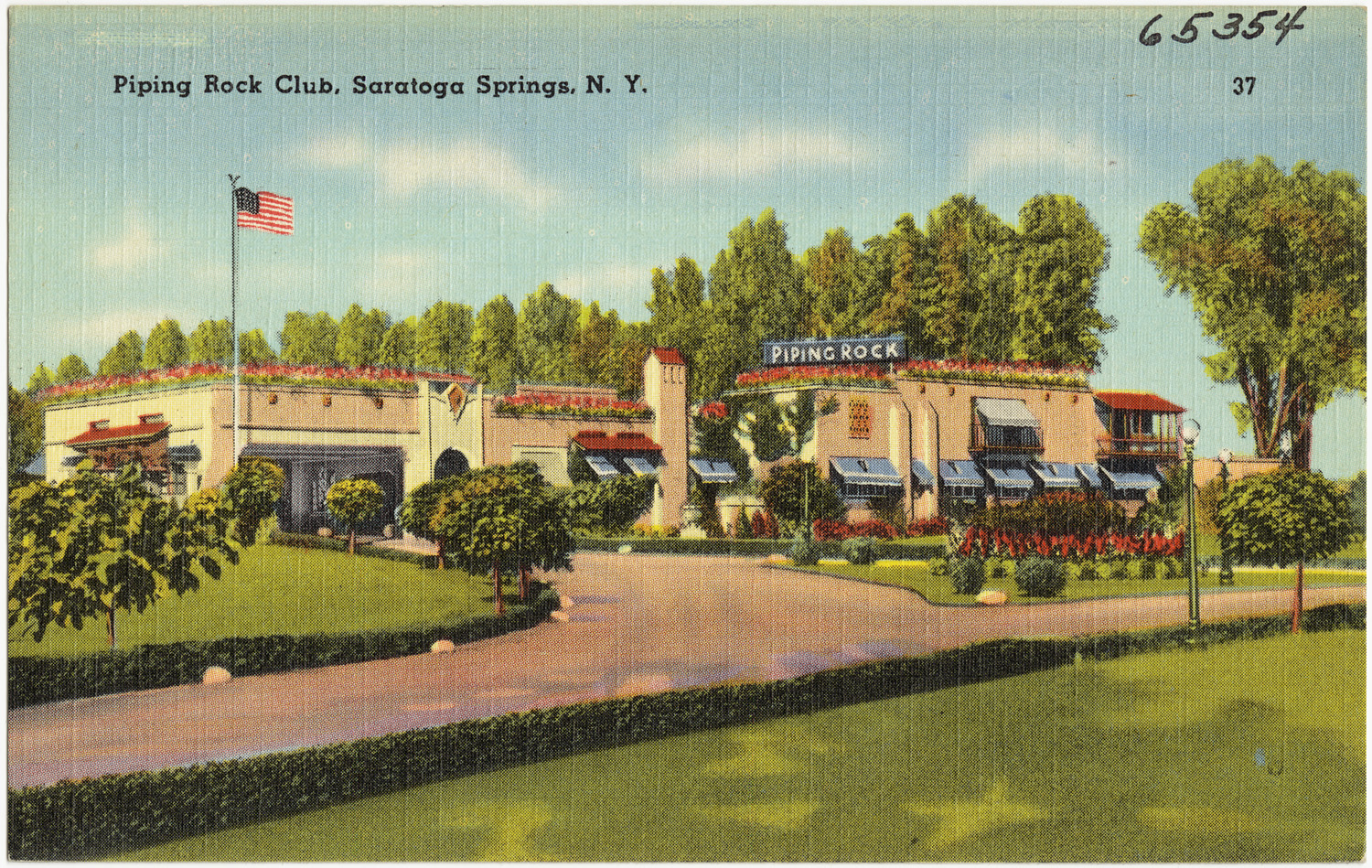
Piping Rock Club

Organized crime expanded its presence in Saratoga Springs during the 1930s and 1940s. Luciano ran the Chicago Club for several years while Lansky subsequently took over the Arrowhead Inn and in the early 1930s opened a second Saratoga casino, the Piping Rock Club, in partnership with Joe Adonis and Frank Costello, who later brought his staff from New York's Copacabana Club to work in Saratoga for the summer.

This second era of gambling ended, however, when pressure from Governor Dewey's administration in the 1940s and negative publicity from the Kefauver Committee's hearings concerning organized crime in 1950 ended official toleration of illegal gambling. The Piping Rock burned down in 1954 under suspicious circumstances. Other abandoned clubs and casinos burned down over the next twenty years.

=== Renewal ===
The city became more accessible with the completion of the Adirondack Northway (Interstate 87), which allowed visitors easier access from the north and south. In addition, cultural resources, such as classical and popular music and dance, flourished.

== Mineral springs ==
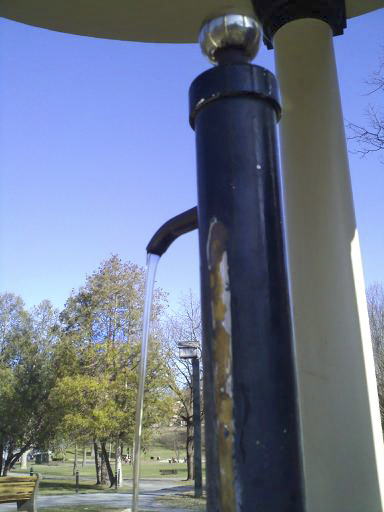
Columbian Spring, one of Saratoga Springs' public springs

The mineral springs occur along the east side of the Saratoga Fault which allows water trapped in subsurface shale layers to reach the surface. The fault displacement can be seen on the east side of Broadway with the best view of the fault at the High Rock Park cliff.

The Mohawk indigenous peoples who inhabited this area used the springs for several hundred years before the arrival of European settlers. Later drilling technology was employed by settlers to tap into the spring sources, and by 1900, 203 springs were flowing, some of which were tapped for carbon dioxide extraction, as well as mineral water. This proved to be unsustainable, and by 1908, New York State passed restrictions on use to allow the aquifer to recharge. As of 2019, there are only 17 productive springs.

Toward the end of the 19th century, excessive pumping for commercial bottling was threatening to deplete the springs. In 1911, the New York State Reservation, now the Spa State Park, was created to protect the springs, and the Lincoln and Roosevelt bath houses were built. Currently, visitors can soak in the mineral waters at the historic Roosevelt Bath house, which also provides spa treatments.

The water from the springs is high in mineral contents, inclucing iron, magnesium, calcium, lithium, iodine, chromium, sodium, zinc, barium, and with 9 of the springs reporting radium content.

Believed by generations to have healing powers, springs can be found in multiple places around the town. However, scientists dispute any medicinal properties from consuming the water due to the high levels of sodium and radium in some of the spring sources.

Most of the springs are covered by small pavilions and marked by plaques. Others are less conspicuous, sometimes just a spigot in a rock. The springs are famous for their varied and distinct tastes: some are clear freshwater, others are saltier, and some taste strongly of a certain mineral such as sodium bicarbonate or sodium chloride. There is a sulfurous odor, but mineral analysis of the water consistently shows almost no presence of dissolved sulfur. The sulfur is in the form of the gas hydrogen sulfide, which degasses from the water very quickly. Visitors are welcome to bottle the spring water for personal consumption.

== Geography ==
According to the United States Census Bureau, the city has a total area of 29.1 square miles (75 km^{2}), of which 28.4 square miles (74 km^{2}) is land and 0.6 square miles (1.6 km^{2}) (2.17%) is water.

The Adirondack Northway of New York (Interstate 87) and US Route 9 pass alongside and through the city, respectively. New York State Route 29, New York State Route 50, New York State Route 9N, and New York State Route 9P lead into Saratoga Springs. NY 9N has its southern terminus and NY 9P has its northern terminus in the city. US 9 and NY 50 overlap in the city, joined briefly by NY 29.

Saratoga Lake is slightly south of the city.

=== Climate ===
Climate data for Saratoga Springs, New York (1991–2020 normals, extremes 1955–present)
Month	Jan	Feb	Mar	Apr	May	Jun	Jul	Aug	Sep	Oct	Nov	Dec	Year
Record high °F (°C)	67 (19)	68 (20)	88 (31)	92 (33)	96 (36)	99 (37)	99 (37)	96 (36)	94 (34)	88 (31)	82 (28)	69 (21)	99 (37)
Mean daily maximum °F (°C)	32.0 (0.0)	35.4 (1.9)	45.3 (7.4)	60.3 (15.7)	72.5 (22.5)	79.9 (26.6)	83.8 (28.8)	82.1 (27.8)	74.9 (23.8)	62.1 (16.7)	48.7 (9.3)	37.0 (2.8)	59.5 (15.3)
Daily mean °F (°C)	23.1 (−4.9)	25.7 (−3.5)	35.1 (1.7)	48.1 (8.9)	59.8 (15.4)	68.0 (20.0)	72.4 (22.4)	70.7 (21.5)	63.3 (17.4)	51.3 (10.7)	39.8 (4.3)	29.3 (−1.5)	48.9 (9.4)
Mean daily minimum °F (°C)	14.3 (−9.8)	16.0 (−8.9)	24.8 (−4.0)	35.9 (2.2)	47.0 (8.3)	56.2 (13.4)	60.9 (16.1)	59.4 (15.2)	51.8 (11.0)	40.5 (4.7)	30.8 (−0.7)	21.6 (−5.8)	36.3 (2.4)
Record low °F (°C)	−33 (−36)	−29 (−34)	−13 (−25)	5 (−15)	21 (−6)	32 (0)	37 (3)	31 (−1)	22 (−6)	2 (−17)	−1 (−18)	−23 (−31)	−33 (−36)
Average precipitation inches (mm)	3.41 (87)	2.65 (67)	3.42 (87)	3.78 (96)	3.86 (98)	4.80 (122)	4.98 (126)	4.11 (104)	3.82 (97)	4.14 (105)	3.49 (89)	3.92 (100)	46.38 (1,178)
Average snowfall inches (cm)	16.5 (42)	15.7 (40)	11.4 (29)	1.8 (4.6)	0.0 (0.0)	0.0 (0.0)	0.0 (0.0)	0.0 (0.0)	0.0 (0.0)	0.1 (0.25)	2.9 (7.4)	15.1 (38)	63.5 (161)
Average precipitation days (≥ 0.01 in)	12.3	9.5	10.5	11.7	12.7	12.4	12.5	11.0	10.0	11.5	11.4	12.3	137.8
Average snowy days (≥ 0.1 in)	8.2	6.9	4.7	1.2	0.0	0.0	0.0	0.0	0.0	0.1	1.8	5.7	28.6
Source: NOAA

== Demographics ==
Historical population
Census	Pop.	Note	%±
1870	7,516		—
1880	8,423		12.1%
1890	11,975		42.2%
1900	12,409		3.6%
1910	12,693		2.3%
1920	13,181		3.8%
1930	13,169		−0.1%
1940	13,705		4.1%
1950	15,473		12.9%
1960	16,630		7.5%
1970	18,845		13.3%
1980	23,906		26.9%
1990	25,001		4.6%
2000	26,186		4.7%
2010	26,586		1.5%
2020	28,491		7.2%
U.S. Decennial Census

=== 2020 census ===
As of the 2020 census, Saratoga Springs had a population of 28,491. The median age was 41.9 years; 15.3% of residents were under the age of 18 and 21.1% were 65 years of age or older. For every 100 females there were 86.9 males, and for every 100 females age 18 and over there were 89.0 males age 18 and over.

There were 12,532 households in Saratoga Springs, of which 19.8% had children under the age of 18 living in them. Of all households, 39.6% were married-couple households, 22.5% were households with a male householder and no spouse or partner present, and 30.4% were households with a female householder and no spouse or partner present. About 39.8% of all households were made up of individuals and 15.3% had someone living alone who was 65 years of age or older.

There were 14,605 housing units, of which 14.2% were vacant. The homeowner vacancy rate was 1.9% and the rental vacancy rate was 11.4%.

95.8% of residents lived in urban areas, while 4.2% lived in rural areas.

Racial composition as of the 2020 census
Race	Number	Percent
White	24,680	90.6%
Black or African American	764	1.7%
American Indian and Alaska Native	55	0.2%
Asian	844	3.0%
Native Hawaiian and Other Pacific Islander	13	0.0%
Some other race	419	1.5%
Two or more races	516	1.0%
Hispanic or Latino (of any race)	2,199	5.9%

=== 2012 American Community Survey ===
In 2012, the median income for a household was $141,392, while the median income for a family was $164,560. Males had a median income of $81,582 versus $67,759 for females. About 1.0% of families and 3.5% of the population were below the poverty line, including 4.3% of those under age 18 and 1.3% of those age 65 or over.

== Economy ==
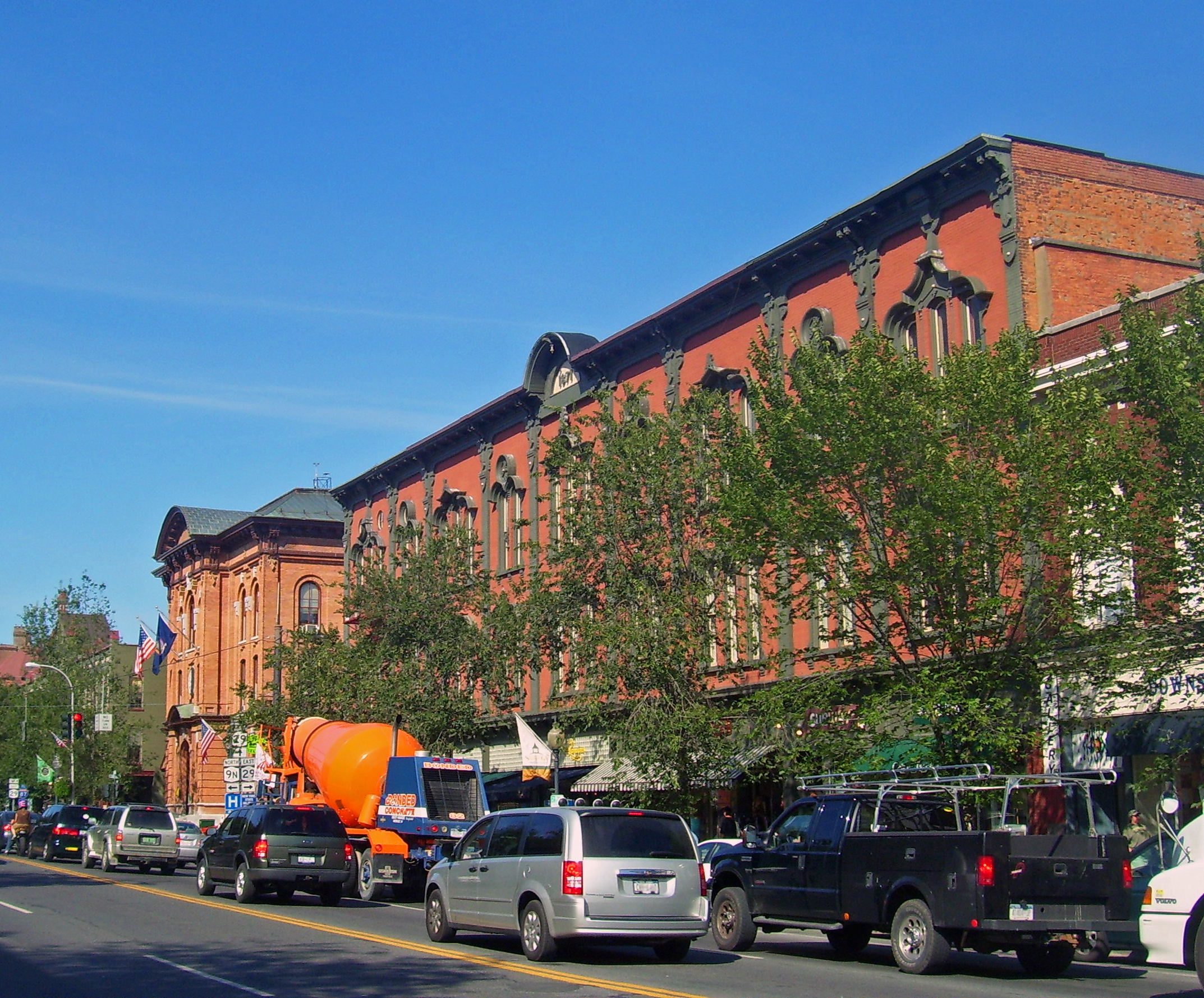
Downtown Saratoga Springs

The Saratoga Spring Water Co. (a division of BlueTriton Brands) is located on Geyser Road. Operating since 1872, this sparkling water has also been served at multiple presidential inaugurations in Washington, D.C., most recently for Barack Obama's second inauguration in 2013. It was also served to participants at the 2023 APEC Summit in San Francisco.

== Arts and culture ==
The Saratoga Performing Arts Center (SPAC) is a covered outdoor amphitheater located on the grounds of the Saratoga Spa State Park, with a capacity of 5,000 in reserved seating and 20,000+ on its general admission lawn area. SPAC is the summer home of the Philadelphia Orchestra and the New York City Ballet, and has hosted a weekend-long jazz festival since 1978. Since 2006, the Saratoga Native American Festival has been held on SPAC grounds each fall.

Museums in the area include the National Museum of Dance and Hall of Fame, the National Museum of Racing and Hall of Fame, the Tang Teaching Museum and the Saratoga Automobile Museum.The singer Don McLean was a frequent performer there early in his career.

Saratoga Springs is home to Yaddo, a 400-acre (1.62 km^{2}; 0.63 sq mi) artists' community, founded by Wall Street financier Spencer Trask and his wife, author Katrina Trask. Since its inception in 1900, Yaddo has hosted 68 authors who later won the Pulitzer Prize and one Nobel Prize winner, Saul Bellow. Leonard Bernstein, Truman Capote, Aaron Copland, Sylvia Plath, and David Sedaris have all been artists-in-residence.

Contra dance at the Flurry Festival

Over Presidents' Day weekend in February, Saratoga Springs draws more than 5000 attendees for the annual Flurry Festival, which features folk dance and music, including one of the largest contra dances in the United States.

=== Museums ===
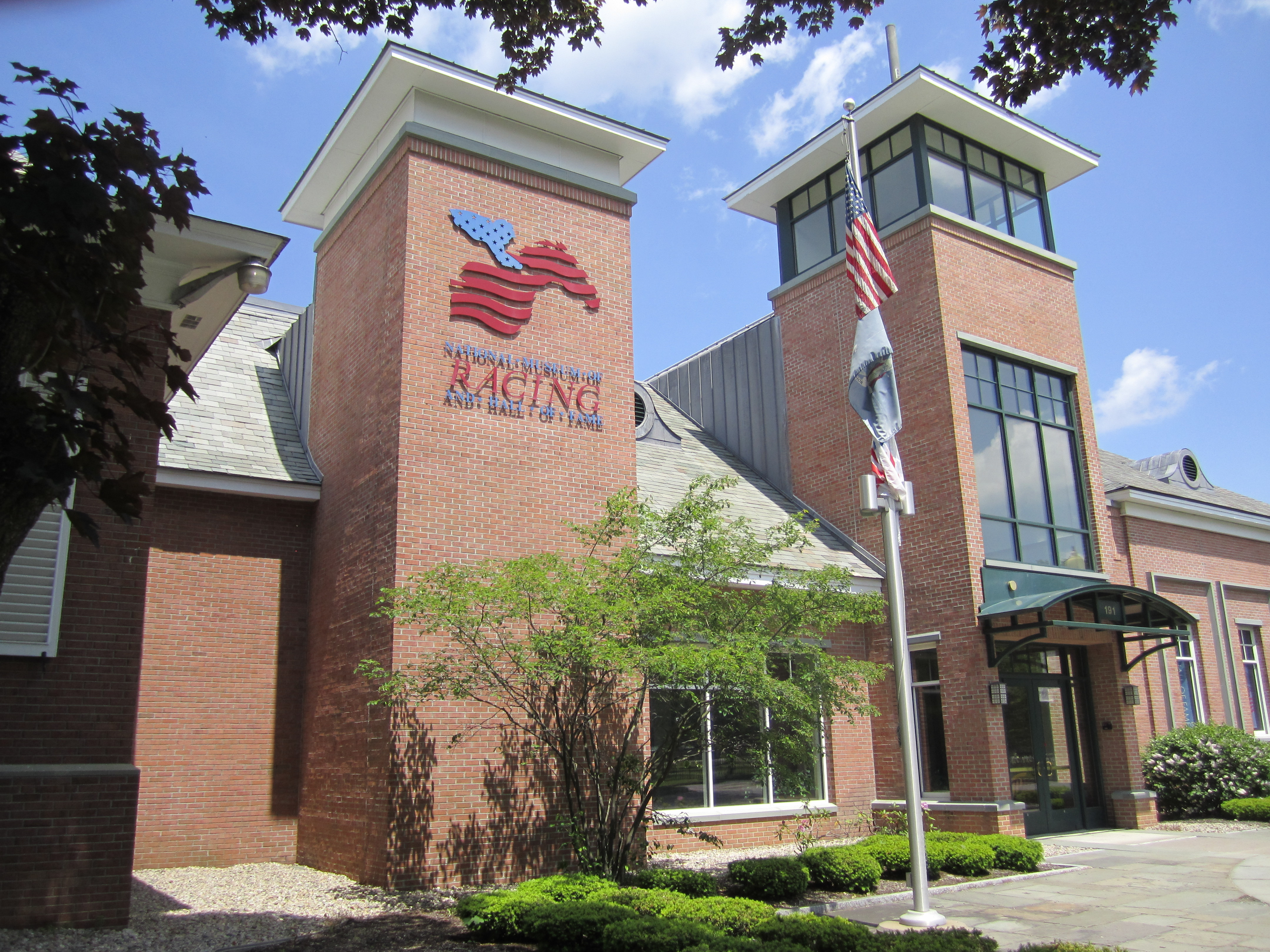
National Museum of Racing and Hall of Fame

- The Frances Young Tang Teaching Museum and Art Gallery at Skidmore College
- Schick Art Gallery, Skidmore College
- National Museum Of Dance And Hall Of Fame
- National Museum of Racing and Hall of Fame
- New York State Military Museum And Veterans Research Center
- Saratoga Automobile Museum
- Saratoga Springs History Museum
- Children's Museum of Saratoga
- Saratoga Arts Center

=== Live performance ===
- Home Made Theater- A not-for-profit theater company, established in 1985, was previously located in the Spa Little Theater of Saratoga Spa State Park until May 2021 before moving to The Anthony "Skip" Scirocco Music Hall
- Saratoga Shakespeare Company - The capital region's only professional classical theater company, established 2001
- Ballet – New York City Ballet at Saratoga Performing Arts Center, Saratoga City Ballet
- Opera – Opera Saratoga
- Music – Caffe Lena, Saratoga Performing Arts Center, Saratoga Music Hall, Universal Preservation Hall

=== National Register of Historic Places listings ===
Saratoga Springs has sixteen places listed in the National Register of Historic Places:

- Arrowhead Casino Prehistoric Site
- Broadway Historic District
- Canfield Casino and Congress Park
- The Drinkhall
- East Side Historic District
- Franklin Square Historic District
- Gideon Putnam Burying Ground
- Petrified Sea Gardens
- Pure Oil Gas Station
- Saratoga Gas, Electric Light and Power Company Complex
- Saratoga Spa State Park District
- Hiram Charles Todd House
- Union Avenue Historic District
- US Post Office-Saratoga Springs
- West Side Historic District
- Yaddo

=== Outdoor sculpture ===
Horses Saratoga Style were two public art events held in 2002 and 2007 where local artists decorated fiberglass horse sculptures that were displayed throughout the city from June through October of the respective years the event was held; some remain on display in front of the businesses that sponsored them. Horses Saratoga Style was organized by the Saratoga County Arts Council and the YMCA of Saratoga.

== Parks and recreation ==
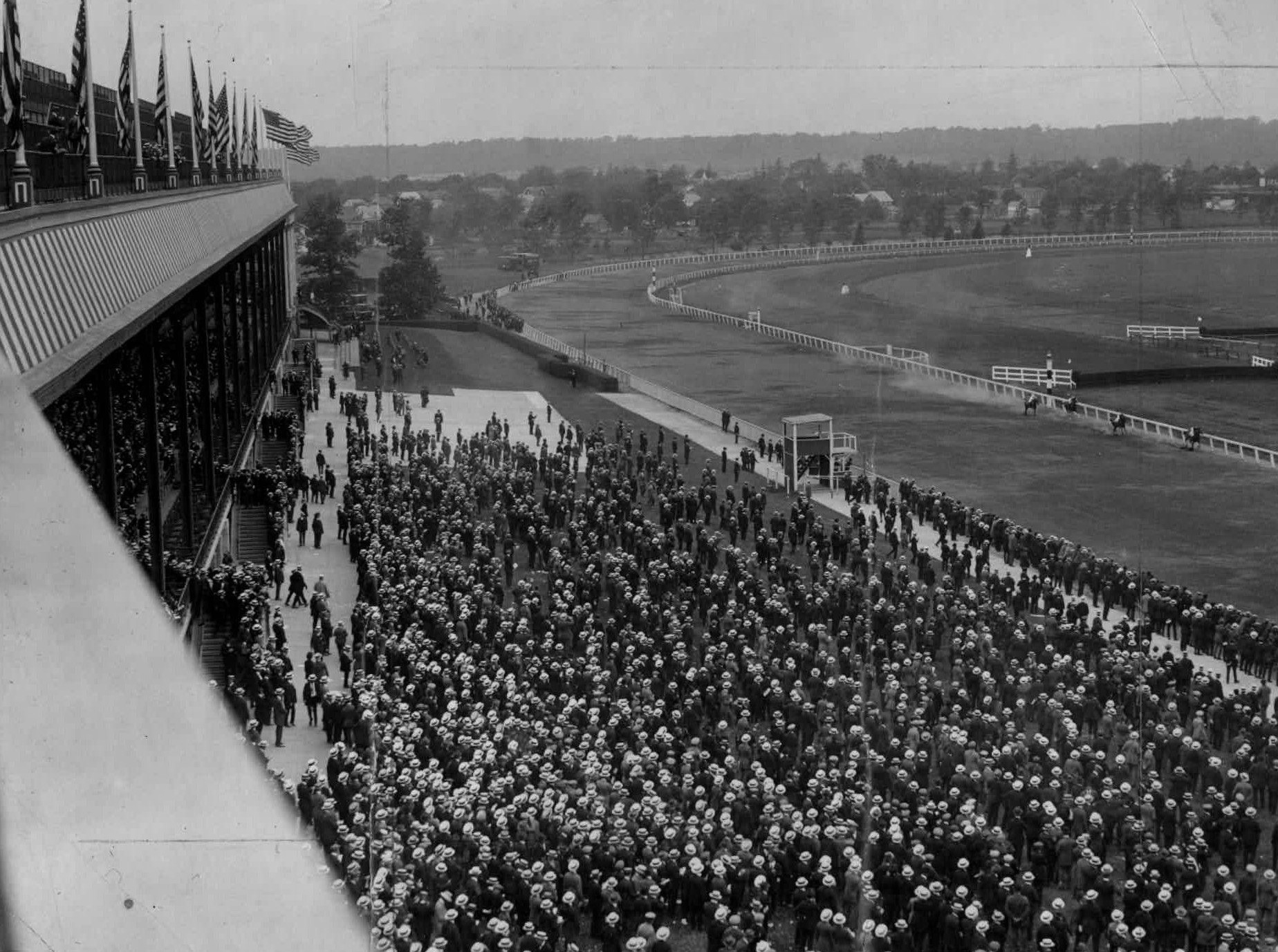
1922 Saratoga Breeders' Cup Handicap

=== Thoroughbred racing ===
Saratoga Race Course opened on August 3, 1863. The first track was located on East Avenue (at the present Oklahoma Training Track location) which is perpendicular to the present Saratoga Race Course, which opened the following year, founded by John Hunter and William R. Travers.

=== Harness racing ===
Saratoga Casino and Raceway, a harness (Standardbred) racetrack that includes a hotel, video gaming facility, nightclub, restaurants, racing casino, and a horse betting simulcast room.

=== Basketball ===
Saratoga Springs was home to the Saratoga Racers of the American Basketball Association from 2024 to 2025 before they moved to nearby Mechanicville, New York. The city was also previously home to the Saratoga Harlem Yankees and Spa City Gamblers.

=== Golf ===
There are three public golf courses in Saratoga Springs: Saratoga National Golf, Saratoga Spa Golf -Located in Saratoga Spa State Park, and Airway Meadows Golf Club, and one private golf course, the Saratoga Golf and Polo Club.

=== Saratoga Spa State Park ===
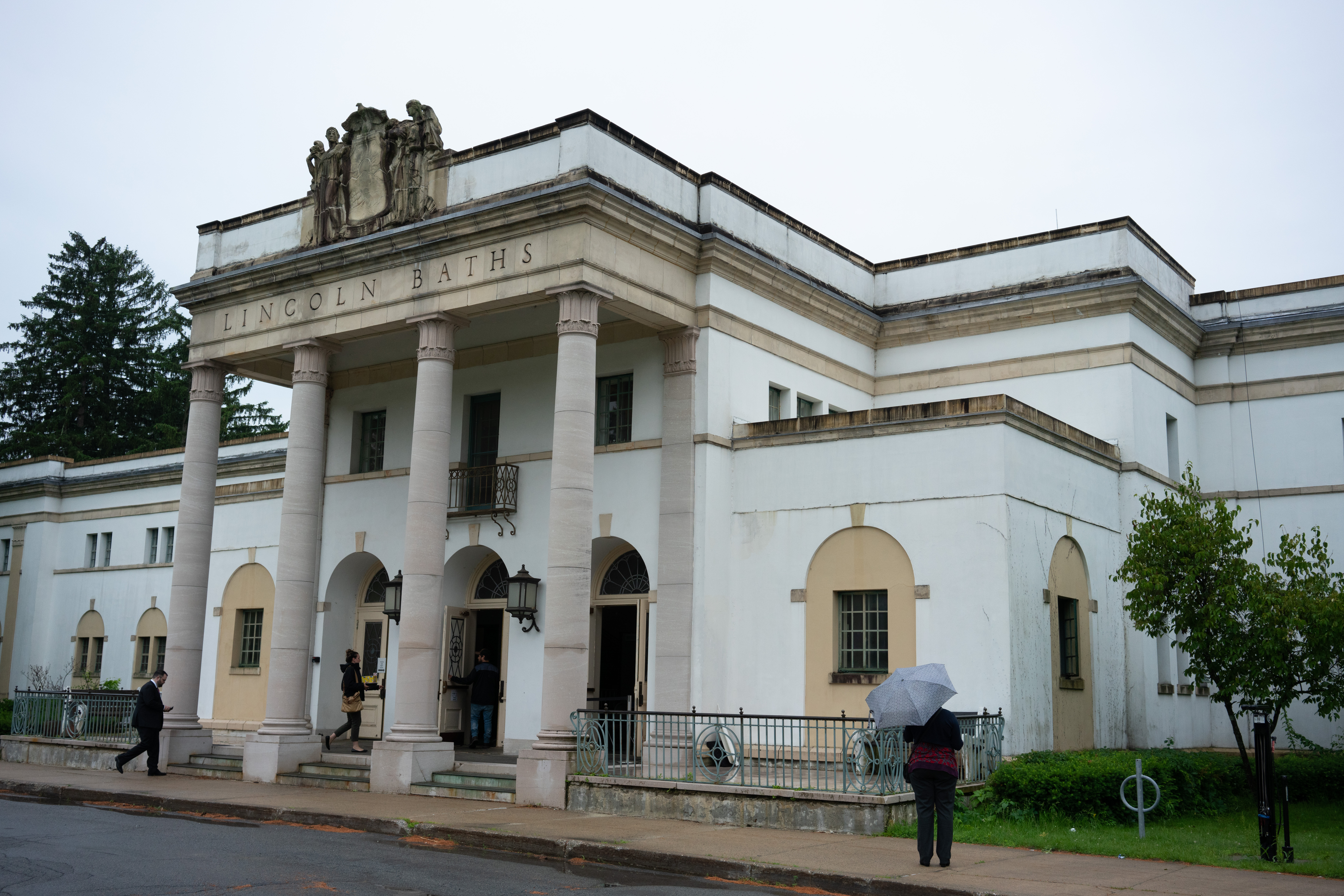
Lincoln Baths

The Saratoga Spa State Park features the culture and mineral springs of Saratoga Springs. The park and includes hiking trails, picnic areas, pools, former and current historic bathhouses and mineral springs. The Saratoga Performing Arts Center (SPAC), Hall of Springs, National Museum of Dance and Hall of Fame, the Saratoga Automobile Museum, the Lincoln Mineral Bathhouse building, Roosevelt Mineral Baths and Spa, and the Gideon Putnam Resort are also located in the park.

=== Skateboard Park ===
The Saratoga Skatepark was built in 1989, and is located in the East Side Recreation area. It was New York State's first municipal skatepark. It includes a concrete skateboard "bowl" and cement ramps. In 2010 the city filled the pool with dirt, citing problems with graffiti, vandalism and "structural gaps" affecting the skating surface. In addition, the city said that it lacked funds to staff guards at the park and claimed it had spent nearly $200,000 on the park since it opened in 1989. A group of skateboarders lobbied for the park, and as of 2023, the redesigned skate park was open.

== Government ==
The Saratoga Springs charter specifies a commission form of city government. Recent efforts to amend the charter have not been successful. The most recent charter change proposal appeared on the ballot in the November 2020 election and was overwhelmingly defeated. Prior attempts have netted mixed results with the closest margin of votes in 2017 where a difference of 10 votes upheld the current system of government.

== Education ==
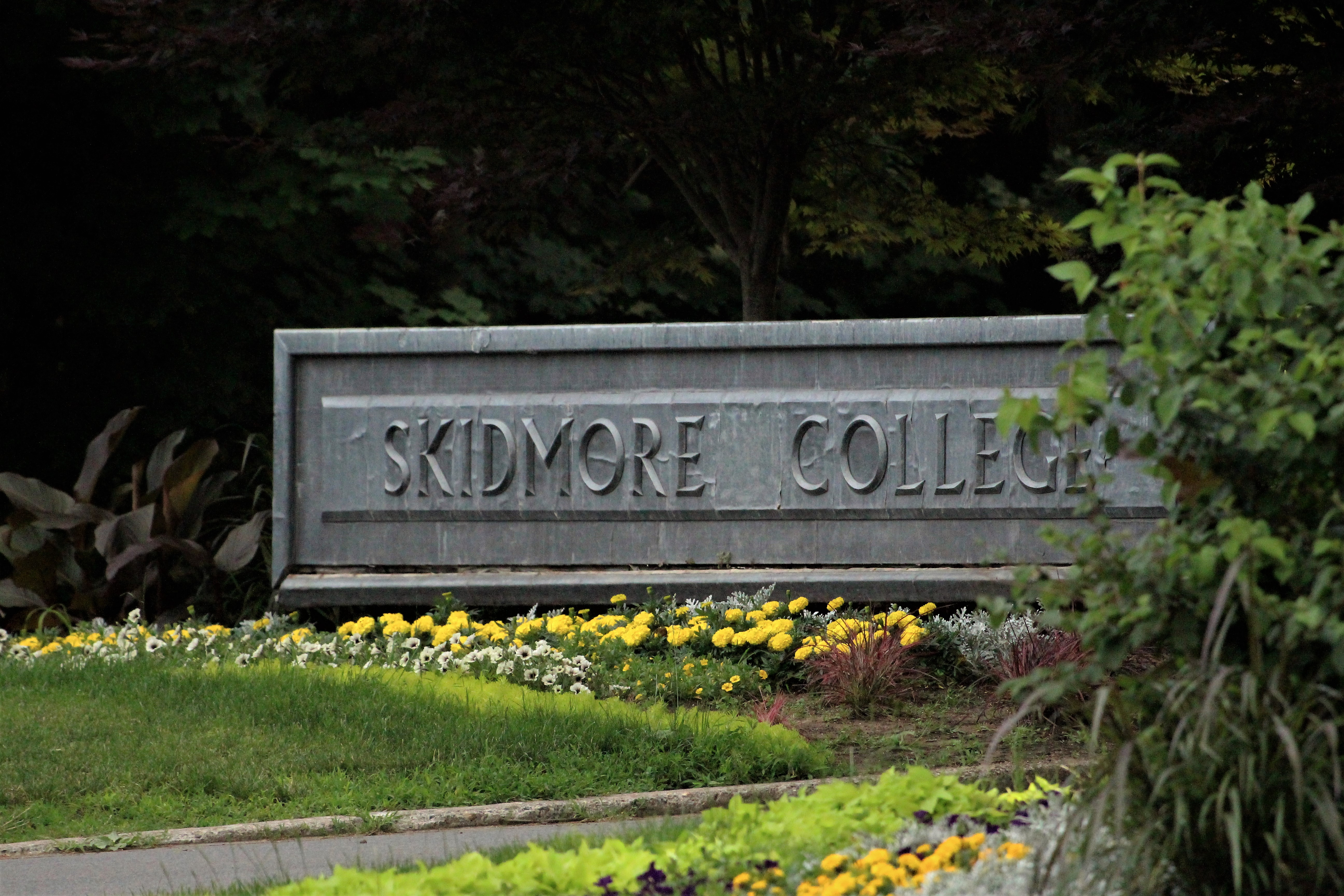
Sign at the entrance of Skidmore College on Broadway in the city of Saratoga Springs, New York

Empire State University and Skidmore College are both located in Saratoga Springs; Verrazzano College (1969–1975) was also located there. During the summer, Skidmore is one of several hosts for the Johns Hopkins Center for Talented Youth. Eastern Nazarene College, located in Quincy, Massachusetts, was founded in Saratoga Springs as the Pentecostal Collegiate Institute and Biblical Seminary at the turn of the 20th century.

The Saratoga Springs City School District is made up of:

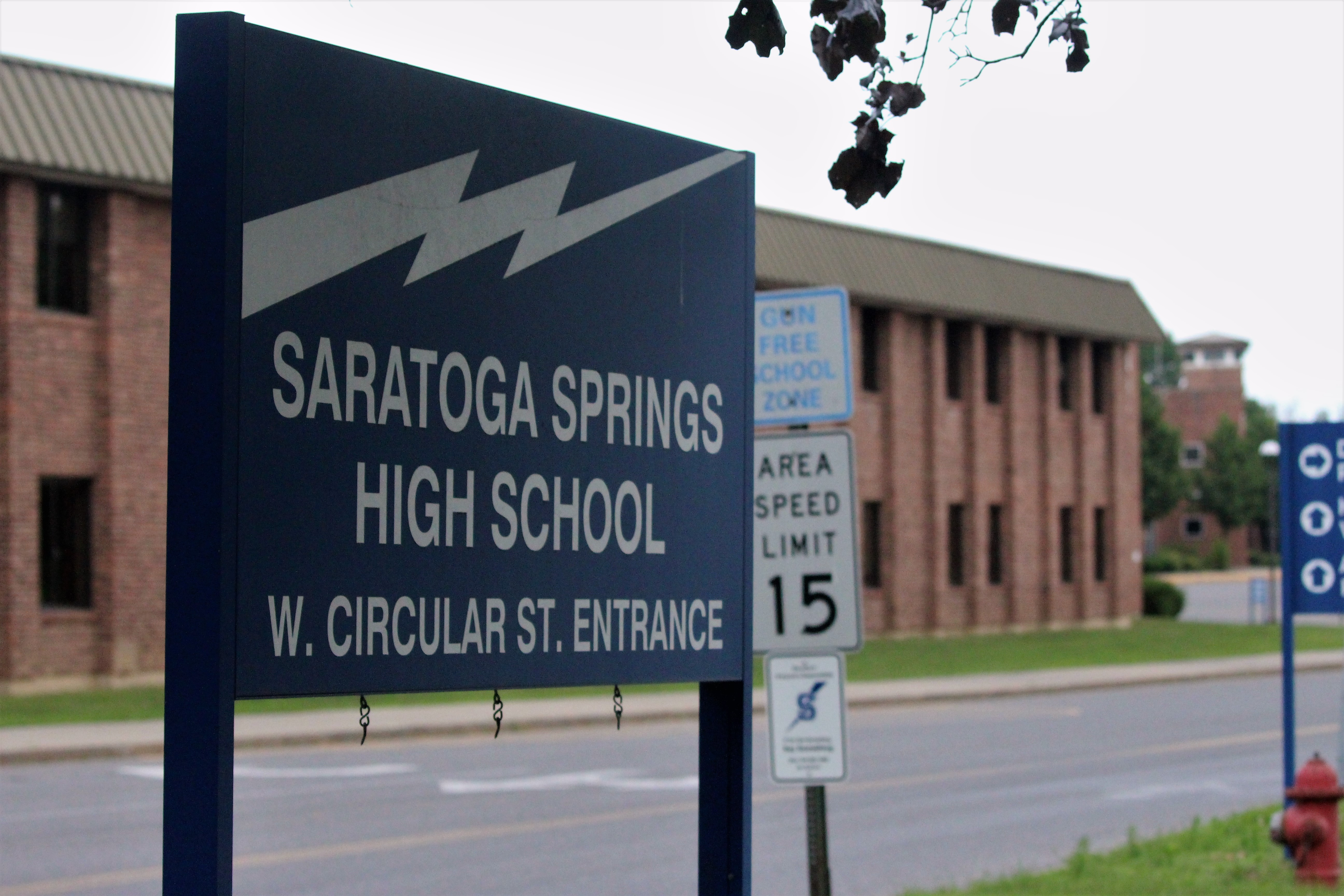
- A sign for Saratoga Springs High School on Circular Street in the city of Saratoga Springs, New York
  Six elementary schools (kindergarten through grade five) – Lake Avenue, Caroline Street, Division Street and Geyser Road in the City of Saratoga Springs; Greenfield in the Town of Greenfield; and Dorothy Nolan in the Town of Wilton
- One middle school (grades six through eight) – Maple Avenue Middle School in the Town of Wilton
- One high school (grades nine through twelve) – Saratoga Springs High School located on the West side on Blue Streak Boulevard in the City of Saratoga Springs.

Private schools in Saratoga Springs include Saratoga Central Catholic High School, St. Clement's Regional Catholic School, The Waldorf School of Saratoga Springs, and Saratoga Independent School. Alternatively, some local children commute to Albany area schools such as The Emma Willard School, The Albany Academies, Doane Stuart School and La Salle Institute.

== Media ==
- Grid (formerly Saratoga Wire) daily online newspaper
- The Saratogian newspaper (daily)
- Saratoga TODAY newspaper (weekly)
- Saratoga Business Journal newspaper (bi-weekly)
- The Spotlight newspaper (weekly)
- Eco Local magazine (monthly)
- Saratoga Seasons magazine
- Saratoga Living magazine (quarterly)
- Simply Saratoga magazine (by-monthly)
- The Skidmore News
- Skidmore Unofficial
- Saratoga.com
- Saratogabusiness.net
- Look TV television station

== Infrastructure ==
=== Transportation ===
A general aviation facility, Saratoga County Airport, is located west of the city in Milton.

Amtrak provides daily rail service to Saratoga Springs, operating the Adirondack between Montreal and New York City, and the Ethan Allen Express between Rutland, Vermont, and New York City.

Bus service includes Greyhound Bus Lines, Adirondack Trailways, Capital District Transportation Authority, and Megabus.

Interstate 87 passes through the city.

== In popular culture ==
Saratoga Springs, Saratoga Race Course, and Saratoga society are frequently featured on-screen and mentioned in films and television.

=== Films featuring Saratoga Springs ===
- Aftermath (2008) – Chris Penn's last film
- Ass Backwards (2013) – Casey Wilson, June Diane Raphael, Alicia Silverstone, Jon Cryer
- Billy Bathgate (1991) – Dustin Hoffman, Nicole Kidman; the Kidman dancing scene was shot at the Hall of Springs.
- Feast of Friends (1970) – The Doors' self-produced documentary; features lengthy concert footage at SPAC (on 9/1/68) and Jim Morrison reciting poetry backstage.
- Ghost Story (1981) – Fred Astaire, John Houseman; houses on North Broadway were used as homes in this film. Cast included Fred Astaire, John Houseman, and Douglas Fairbanks Jr.
- The Homestretch (1947) – Maureen O'Hara, Cornel Wilde
- My Old Man (1979) – Kristy McNichol, Warren Oates, Eileen Brennan; made-for-TV movie, based on an Ernest Hemingway story, was filmed at Saratoga Race Course, various locations in Saratoga Springs, and throughout Saratoga County.
- Paul's Case (1980) – Eric Roberts, Lindsay Crouse
- Saratoga (1937) – Clark Gable, Lionel Barrymore, Jean Harlow; notable for being Harlow's last film, as she collapsed on set during filming and died. Multiple scenes shot at Saratoga. Filmed on location at the Saratoga Race Course.
- Saratoga Trunk (1945) – Gary Cooper, Ingrid Bergman
- The Horse Whisperer (1998) – Robert Redford, Scarlett Johansson; special effects for the horse and rider accident were shot on location at the southern end of Saratoga Spa State Park. Also, a room at the Gideon Putnam Hotel was made into a shoddier motel room.
- Virgin Alexander (2012) – Rick Faugno, Paige Howard, Bronson Pinchot

=== Radio ===
- Saratoga Springs was the setting for a radio soap opera by the same name, created by ZBS Foundation and written by Meatball Fulton. The 1989 series was produced as 90 four-minute daily episodes for National Public Radio. The story incorporates Saratoga Springs historical facts and utilizes local actors as well as ZBS regulars. Lena Spencer of Caffe Lena is listed as playing herself. A "Best of Saratoga Springs" compilation (c. 2004) can be purchased from ZBS (www.zbs.org). During spring and early summer, 2007, the original four-minute episodes were podcast by ZBS.

=== Television ===
- In the Western series Maverick, Saratoga Springs serves as the primary setting of the season 3 episode "Maverick Springs" in which Bret Maverick, played by James Garner, is hired to convince a wealthy rancher's brother to return home.
- In the pilot episode of the 1960s sitcom Green Acres, it was noted that Eddie Albert's character of Oliver Wendell Douglas was born in Saratoga Springs.
- In the sci-fi series, The Orville, Saratoga Springs is featured in the 11th episode of season 2, "Lasting Impressions", which first aired on March 21, 2019. A time capsule from 2015 is unearthed out of Saratoga Springs approximately 400 years in the future by the ship's crew. One of the items contributed is a smartphone by a young woman who is a native of the city named Laura Huggins, played by Leighton Meester, who wanted future discoverers to know about her and her life. She becomes the object of infatuation by the ship's helmsman, Gordon Malloy, played by Scott Grimes. Gordon uploads the phone's data to the ship's computer and requests a simulation of Laura's environment and life in Saratoga Springs.
- In the period drama The Gilded Age, Saratoga Springs is mentioned in the 8th episode of season 1, "Tucked Up in Newport," when Agnes van Rhijn, played by Christine Baranski, mentions that Saratoga Springs was popular "when [she] was a bride."

=== Music ===
- In the song "Adelaide's Lament" in the 1950 Broadway musical Guys and Dolls, Adelaide, who has an eternal cold caused by her fiancé's refusal to finally marry, sings "When they get on that train to Niagara / She can hear church bells chime / The compartment is air-conditioned / And the mood sublime... / Then they get off at Saratoga for the fourteenth time / A person can develop la grippe!".
- In the 1972 Carly Simon song "You're So Vain" the singer references horseracing in Saratoga Springs: "Well, I hear you went up to Saratoga, and your horse naturally won ...".
- In 1987, Whitney Houston's music video for "Didn't We Almost Have It All", the second single from her second studio album, was filmed at Saratoga Performing Arts Center. The video was rotated regularly on MTV and it eventually became her fifth (of a record-breaking seven) consecutive number one hits on the Billboard 100 chart.
- On September 1, 1977, Jackson Browne recorded "Rosie" at SPAC and it appeared on the platinum album Running on Empty the following year.

=== Food ===
- It is believed that the club sandwich was invented in the Canfield Casino in 1894.
- A legend claims that potato chips were invented at Moon's Lake House on Saratoga Lake by George Crum in 1854, in response to a customer's constant remarks about his french fries being cut too thick. However, the first recorded recipe appears in William Kitchiner's 1817 The Cook's Oracle.

=== Other ===
- Walt Disney World Resort has a themed resort called Disney's Saratoga Springs Resort & Spa, whose theme and design pays homage to this city. Additionally, the Walt Disney World Railroad station at Main Street U.S.A. in the Magic Kingdom was modeled after and closely resembles the culturally significant Victorian style railroad depot that once stood within downtown Saratoga Springs.
- The Courtship of Susan Bell, a story by Anthony Trollope set in Saratoga Springs, appeared in Harper's New Monthly Magazine in 1860 and was subsequently included in Trollope's Tales of All Countries (First Series, 1861).
- The James Bond novel Diamonds are Forever contained several scenes set in Saratoga Springs and its racecourse.
- In the novel Katie, written by Michael McDowell, Part IX is set in Saratoga Springs.
- Saratoga native Solomon Northup's memoir Twelve Years a Slave was made into a hit movie in 2013.

== Sister cities ==
- Vichy (France) since 1994
- Waveland, Mississippi. In the spring of 2006, Saratoga Springs decided to help out the people of Waveland in the aftermath of Hurricane Katrina via a "Mardi Gras" themed festival downtown.

== See also ==
- Category:People from Saratoga Springs, New York
- Geyser Crest
- International Kindergarten Union, founded in Saratoga Springs, 1892
- List of mayors of Saratoga Springs, New York
- Sans Souci Hotel (Ballston Spa)
- Saratoga Revolution, a baseball team of Saratoga Springs
- The Witch of Saratoga, local legend of a spirit that haunts the area from the 1860s
