= Saratoga Revolution =

Collegiate summer basketball team in NY

Information
- League: New York Collegiate Baseball League (East Division)
- Location: Saratoga Springs, New York
- Ballpark: Gavin Park
- Founded: 2016
- League championships: None
- Division championships: None
- Ownership: Saratoga Revolution, Inc.
- Management: Presidents: Tom Coons and Kim Coons; Director of Baseball Operations: Tom Coons
- Manager: CJ Baker

The Saratoga Revolution were a collegiate summer baseball team based in Saratoga Springs, New York that was to play in the New York Collegiate Baseball League.

== History ==
Founded in 2016, the team were published by NYCBL as participants in the 2017 season. They were owned by non-profit Saratoga Revolution, Inc., founded by Tom and Kim Coons. However, in January 2017 NYCBL revoked the team's membership of the league due to an accusation against co-owner Tom Coons in another appointment, with all fees collected being refunded and player contracts cancelled.
