= Geyser Crest =

Coordinates: 43.047°N 73.831°W

Geyser Crest is a residential neighborhood in the southwest section of the city of Saratoga Springs and the east part of the town of Milton, New York, in the United States. It is separated from downtown Saratoga Springs by Geyser Road and Route 50. Most of the neighborhood homes were built in the 1970s. Most children attend Geyser Road Elementary School, Maple Avenue Middle School, and Saratoga Springs High School; a small number who live in the far west section attend Ballston Spa Central Schools.

Geyser Crest has an elevation of 351 feet (107 m). Geyser Crest appears on the Saratoga Springs U.S. Geological Survey Map and is in the Eastern Time Zone (UTC -5 hours). Geyser Crest also observes daylight saving time.
