= Saratoga Spa State Park =

- U.S. National Register of Historic Places
- U.S. National Historic Landmark
- New York State Register of Historic Places
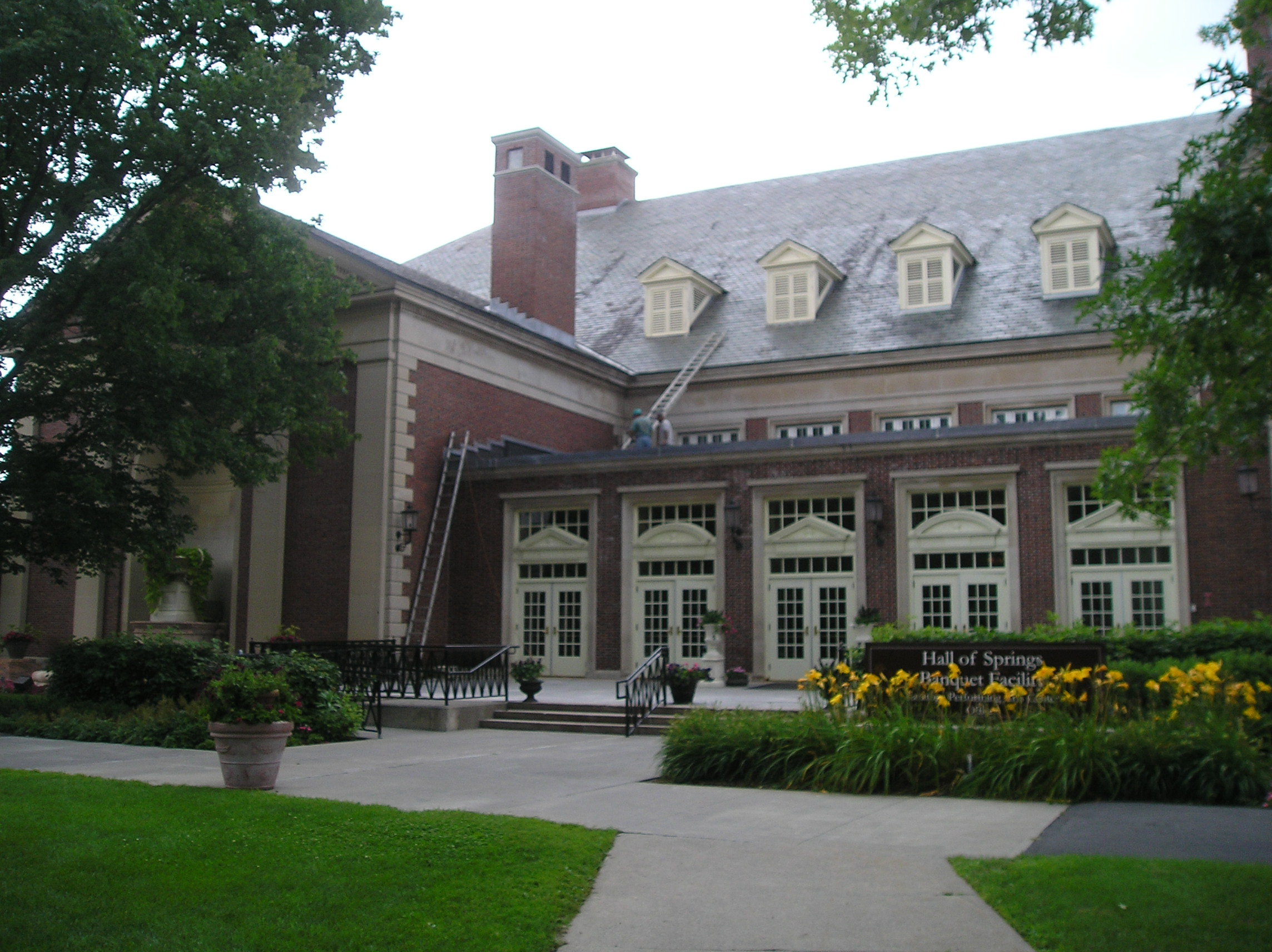
- The Hall of Springs, 2008
- Interactive map showing the location of Saratoga Spa State Park
- Location: Saratoga Springs, New York, Town of Milton, New York, Town of Malta, New York
- Coordinates: 43°3′4″N 73°48′14″W
- Built: 1835
- Architectural style: Colonial Revival, Beaux Arts
- NRHP reference No.: 85002357
- NYSRHP No.: 09140.000339

Significant dates
- Added to NRHP: September 12, 1985
- Designated NHL: February 27, 1987
- Designated NYSRHP: July 19, 1985

Saratoga Spa State Park is a 2,379-acre (9.63 km^{2}) state park located in Saratoga County, New York in the United States. The park is in the City of Saratoga Springs, near US 9 and NY 50.

The grounds contain mineral springs, classical bath and spa houses, and the Saratoga Performing Arts Center.

== History ==
Towering trees line the Avenue of the Pines in Saratoga Spa State Park.

The area, part of which became the park, drew interest from Mohawk and Iroquois Native American tribes for its hunting and mineral springs. The Native American name for the area was Kayaderosseras. The first recorded use of the springs was by Sir William Johnson during the French and Indian War, who was brought to Saratoga to recover from wounds.

In the 19th century, the area became much visited for its purported medicinal effects. Entrepreneurs dug wells and bottled the mineral water for sale and gas companies sold the carbonation to soda fountains. In 1907, the stage was set to protect the springs in a lawsuit Frank Hathorn vs. Dr. Strong's Sanitarium, which showed that pumping on one well decreased the flow of water in wells across the city. The court certified the relationship between wells and when Dr. Strong stopped pumping, the flow of water in Mr. Hathorn's well resumed its natural flow. In 1908, as the springs were being depleted, the New York Assembly passed an injunction against pumping water; however the injunction was ignored. In 1909, governor Charles Evans Hughes signed into law a bill that made the springs of Saratoga a state reservation.

In the 1930s, Reconstruction Finance Corporation funds were used to develop bath houses, research facilities and a drink hall. The Saratoga Reservation was designed with graded walkways intended to help rehabilitate those with heart conditions. After World War II veterans were welcomed as part of their readjustment and Holocaust survivors began using the baths as part of their healing process.

The spa was named a state park in 1962. It was declared a National Historic Landmark in 1987, for its natural and architectural features, and for its role as the subject of early conservation measures.

In 2007, it was confirmed by state officials that the reportedly "pure" mineral water used in the public baths at the state park was actually mixed with tap water from a nearby source.

== Park features ==
=== Springs ===
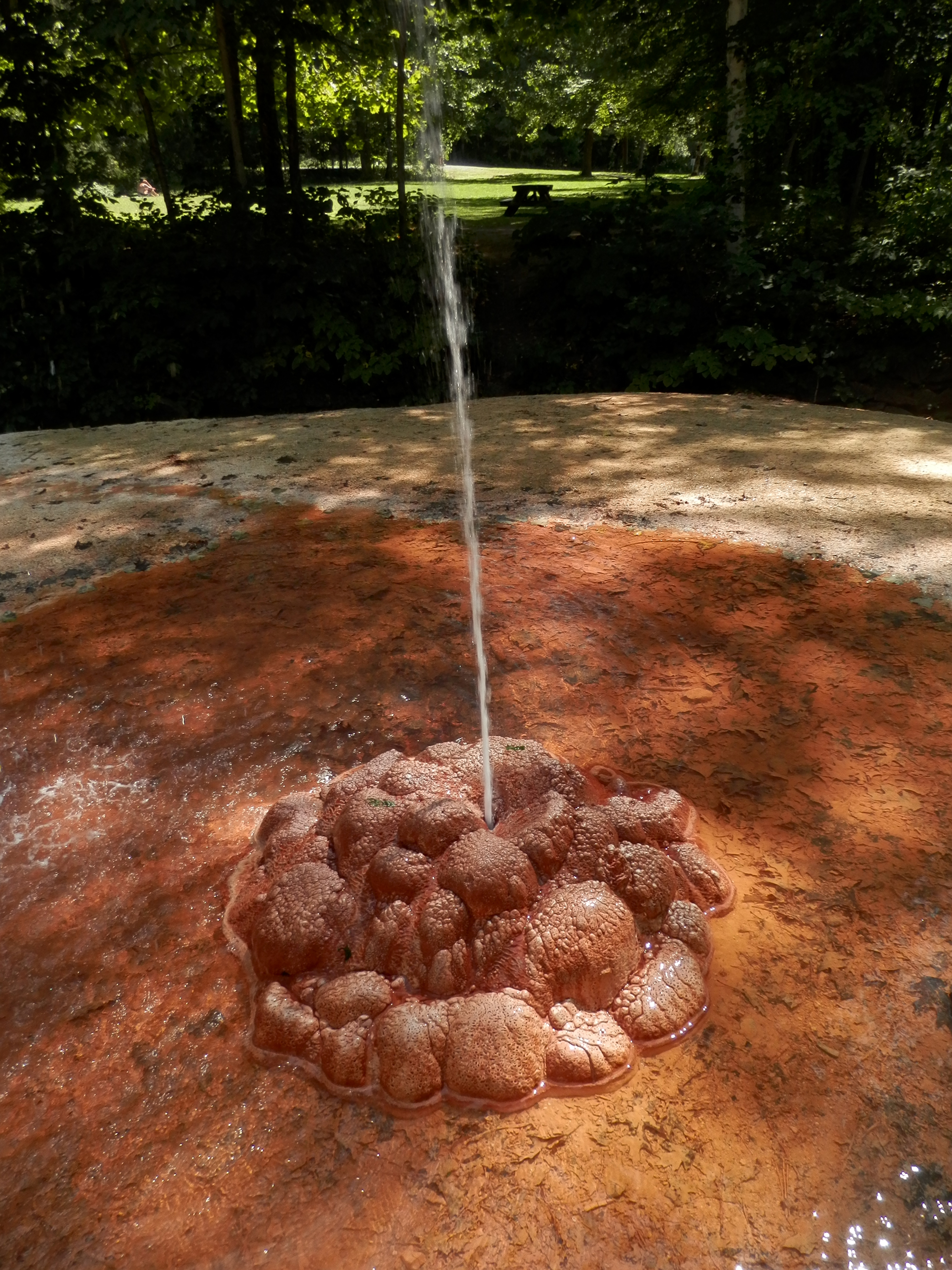
The Geyser Island Spouter in 2015

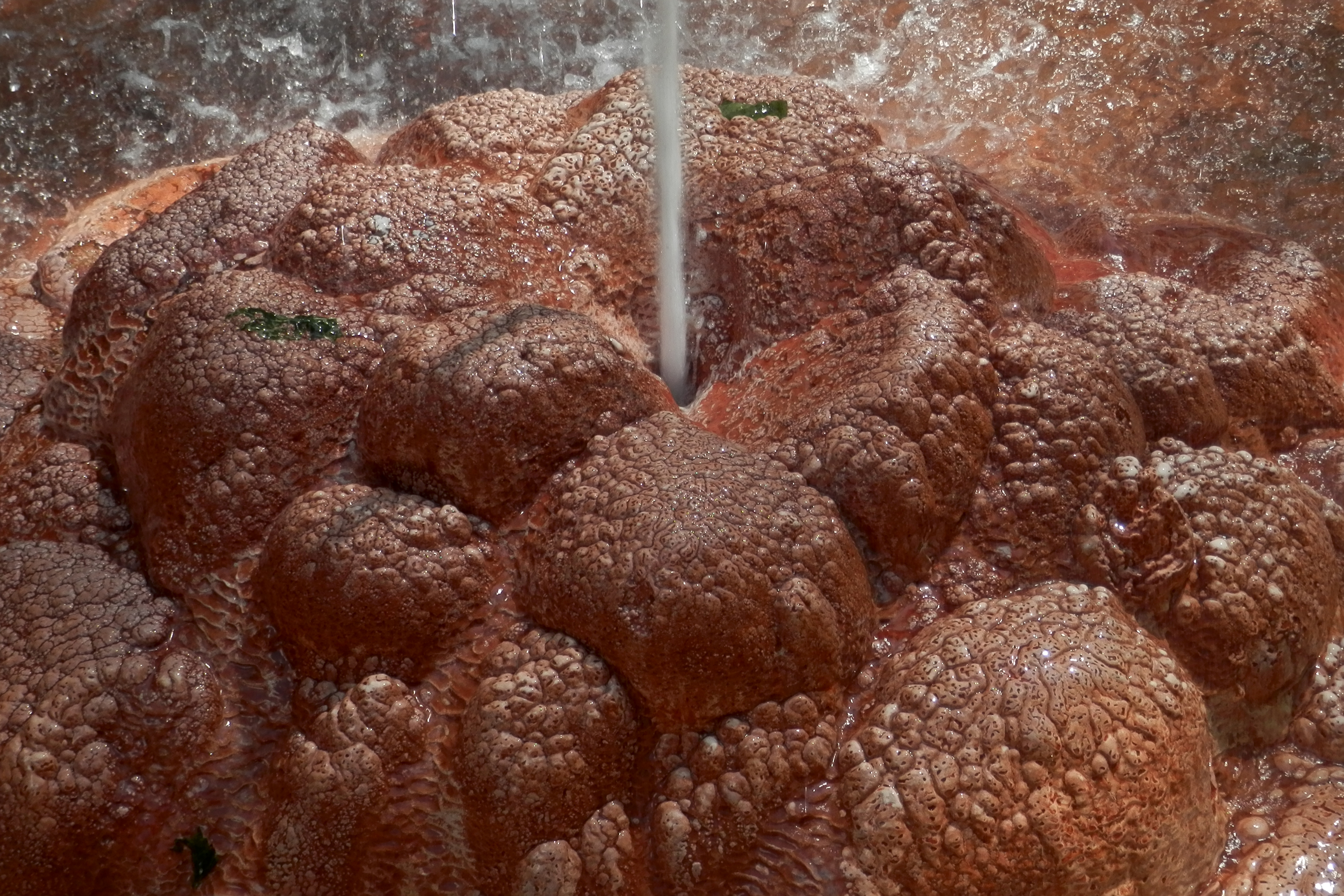
Detail of tufa deposits at the Geyser Island Spouter's base

Though the creek in the park is called Geyser Creek, Saratoga Springs area does not feature actual geysers. In Geysers, water is forced from underground by heat related to seismic activity. Instead, Saratoga's "spouters" spring up due to the pressure of pockets of carbonic gas trapped beneath deep layers of shale. The famous mineral springs arise from fissures in the Saratoga Fault, which runs 65 miles (105 km) from Whitehall to Albany. The carbonated water that vents in springs and geysers is rich in minerals and salts.

Two of the most visited springs today are Geyser Island Spouter and Orenda Spring, along Geyser Creek. Geyser Island Spouter, which sends a narrow plume of water 10 to 15 feet (3 to 5 m) into the air, first emerged in the early 1900s. Since that time, it has deposited minerals that grow a tufa deposit at the rate of two inches (5 cm) per year. Orenda Spring has created a massive tufa dome, which continues to fossilize leaves and other debris as it grows.

==== Springs in operation ====
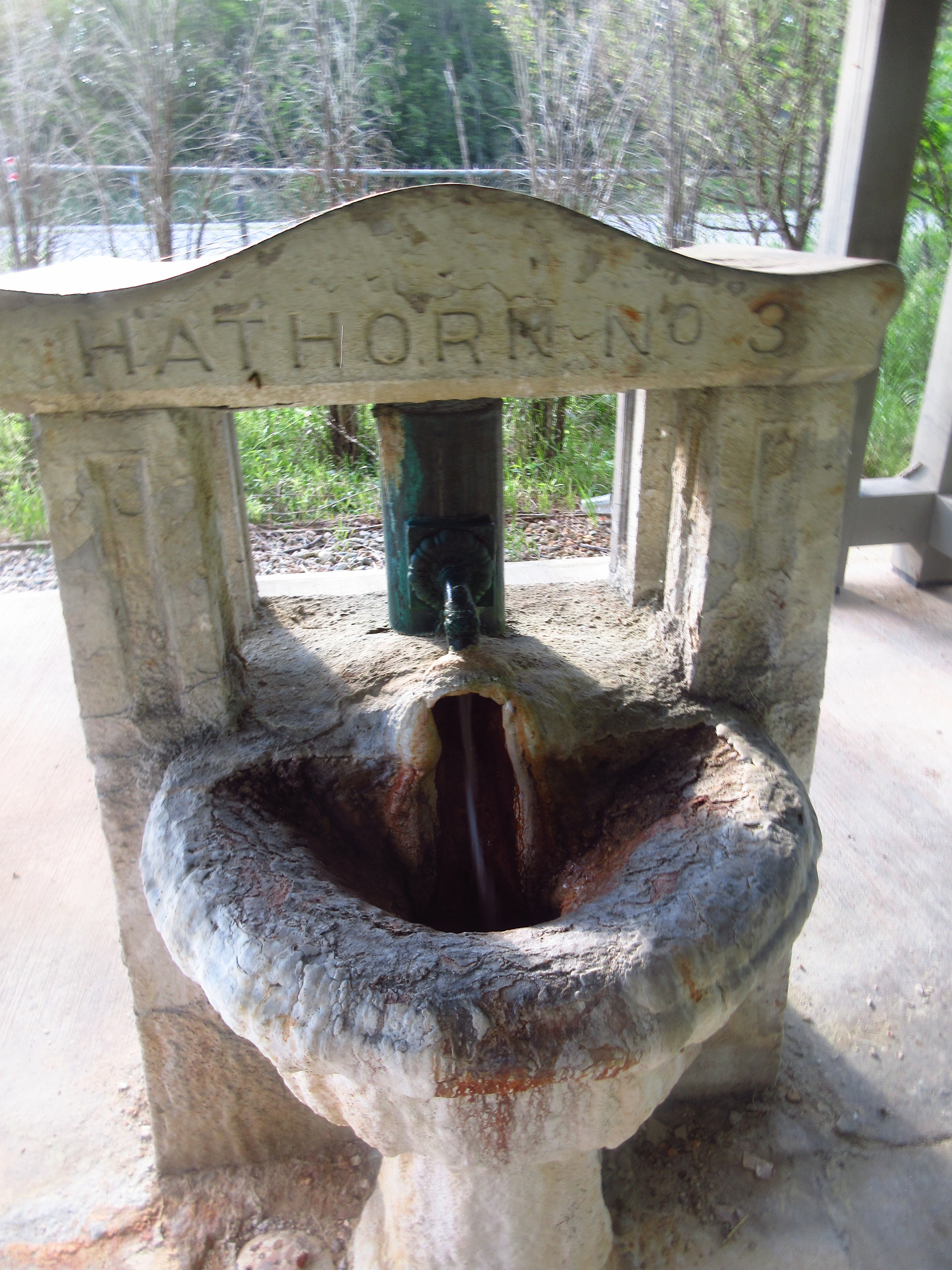
Decorative wells cap many of the springs.

- Hathorn
- Orenda
- Hayes
- Charlie
- Geyser Island
- State Seal
- Polaris
- Lincoln (Baths)
- Shonts
- Tallulah
- Karista

=== Venues and museums ===
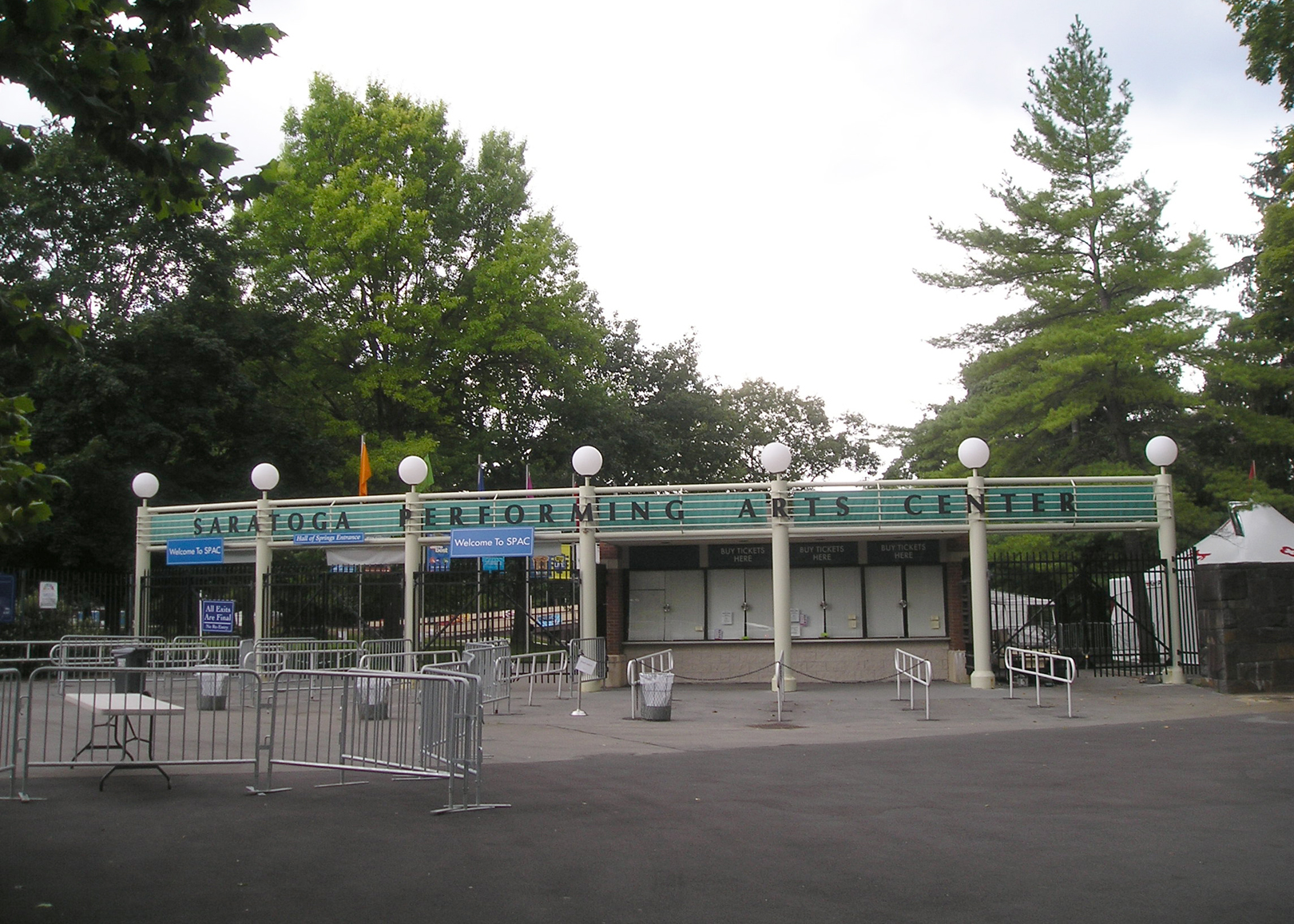
The entrance gates for the Saratoga Performing Arts Center

The park hosts theater and other events. The Saratoga Performing Arts Center, located on the state park grounds, has been the summer home of the Philadelphia Orchestra and New York City Ballet since 1966. The SPAC Amphitheater is 110 feet (34 m) high, sits in a natural, curved bowl bordered by large pine trees. The amphitheater has seating for 5,100 and the lawn can hold an additional 25,000 people.

The park contains the Spa Little Theater, which hosts plays throughout the year. The Spa Little Theater is located on the north side of the park office.

The park is also home to the National Museum of Dance and Hall of Fame, the Saratoga Automobile Museum, the Lincoln Mineral Baths and Spa, and the Gideon Putnam Resort & Spa.

=== Recreation ===
View of Saratoga Spa State Park's perimeter

Saratoga Spa State Park offers a variety of recreational opportunities, some of which require small admission fees.

Several pools are available at the park. The "Peerless Pool" is a complex of three pools, including a children's pool, water slides, and a zero depth entry Olympic-sized swimming pool. The "Victoria Pool" is a smaller pool located near the golf course and surrounded by covered arcades. It was built when the original park buildings were constructed. The bath house was on the north end and the golf house was on the south end. Today the former golf house has been converted to a restaurant.

The park also has tennis courts, two golf courses, picnic areas, horseshoe pits, softball fields, and volleyball courts. Several picnic pavilions are equipped with electricity and all have nearby restrooms.

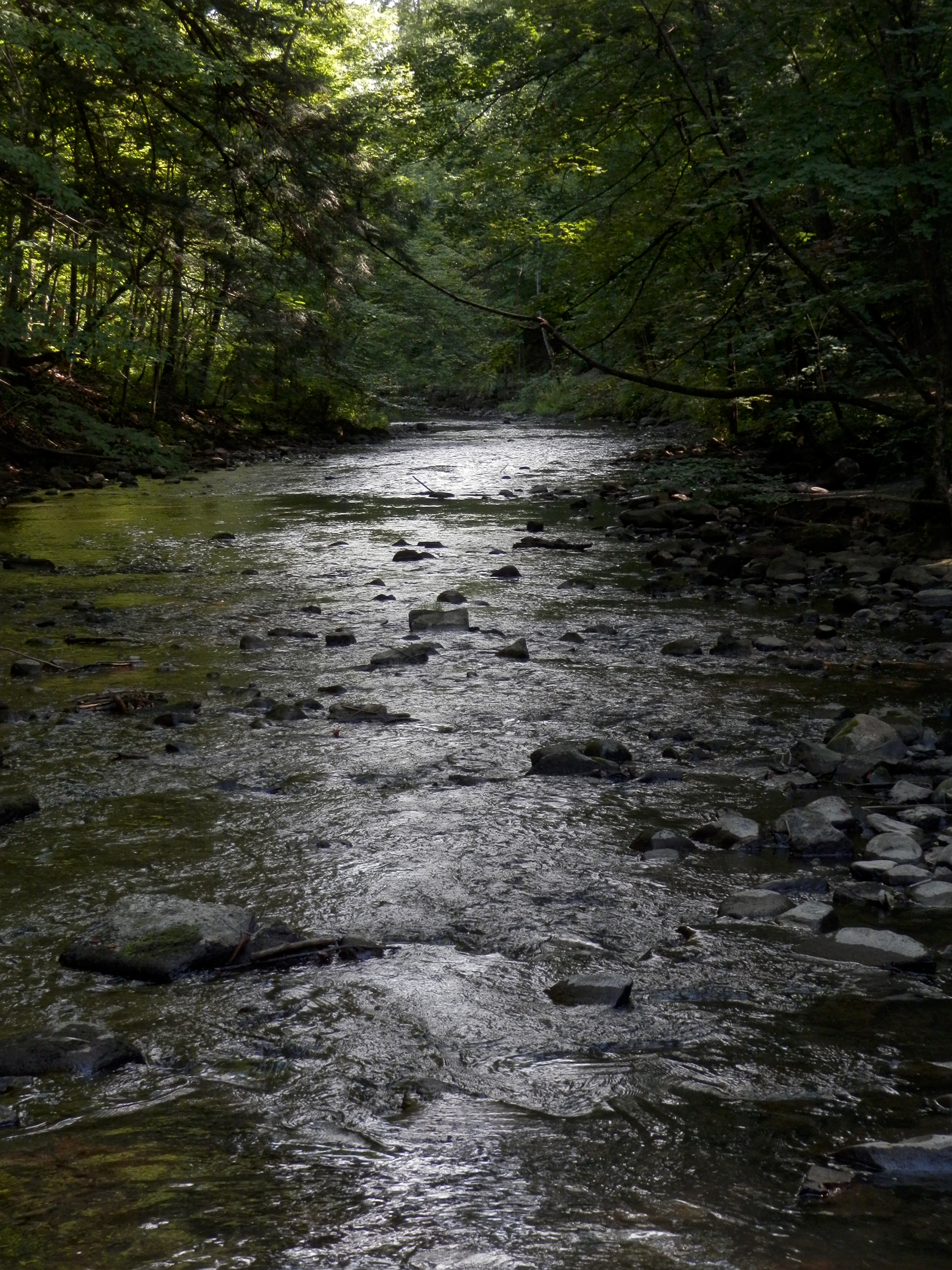
A view of Geyser Creek within Saratoga Springs State Park

A stretch of Geyser Creek is located in the park and offers opportunities for fishing. Trails for hiking and snowshoeing are also found within the park. The park hosts ice skating in the winter and interpretive programs throughout the year. It also hosts the annual New York State Section 2 Cross Country Championships.

== See also ==
- List of contemporary amphitheatres
- List of New York state parks
- National Register of Historic Places listings in Saratoga County, New York
