= Saratoga Performing Arts Center =

Amphitheatre in New York, United States

Coordinates: 43.0553°N 73.8058°W

- SPAC
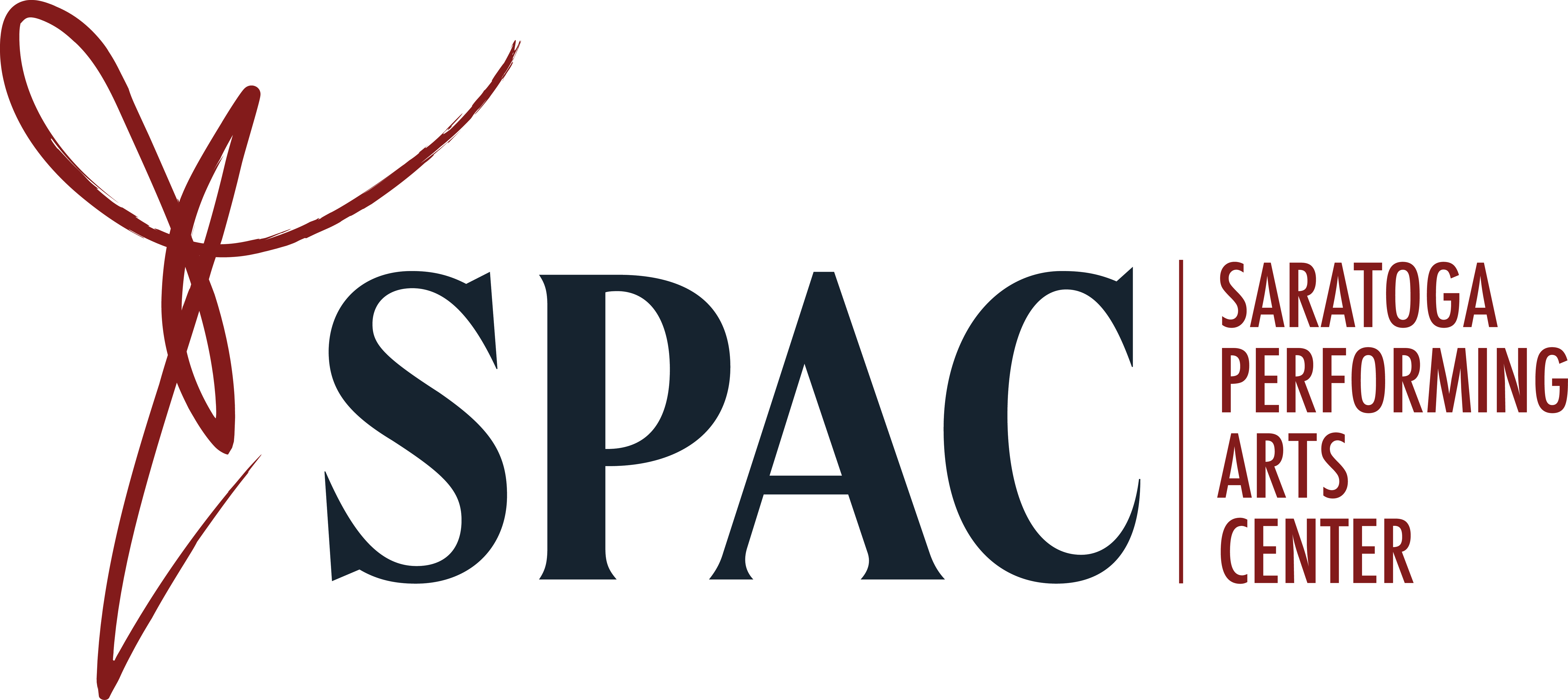

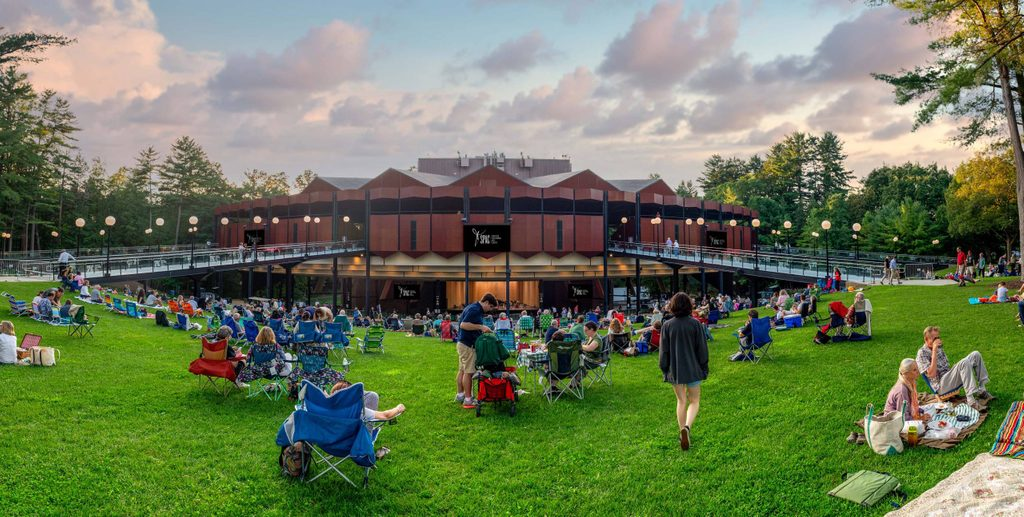
- Interactive map of Saratoga Performing Arts Center
- Address: 108 Avenue of Pines, Saratoga Springs, New York, U.S. Saratoga Springs; United States
- Location: Saratoga Springs, New York, U.S.
- Owner: State of New York
- Operator: Saratoga Performing Arts Center, Inc. (popular music concerts booked by Live Nation)
- Seating type: reserved, lawn
- Capacity: 5,103 seats, 20,000 on lawn
- Type: Outdoor amphitheatre

Construction
- Built: 1964-1965
- Opened: July 9, 1966

Website
- spac.org

Saratoga Performing Arts Center (SPAC), also known as Albany Med Health System at SPAC for Live Nation-promoted events, is a large amphitheatre located in Saratoga Springs, New York, on the grounds of Saratoga Spa State Park. It presents summer performances of classical music, jazz, pop and rock, country, comedy, and dance. It opened on July 9, 1966, with a presentation of George Balanchine's A Midsummer Night's Dream by the New York City Ballet.

The Center is the official summer home of the New York City Ballet, which is in residence for one week in July, and the Philadelphia Orchestra, which is in residence for three weeks in August.

SPAC also serves as the common venue for high school graduations, particularly for Saratoga Springs, Burnt Hills-Ballston Lake, Shenendehowa, and Ballston Spa High Schools. Skidmore College commencement exercises also take place at the venue.

Saratoga Performing Arts Center, Inc. is a non-profit charitable corporation that runs the arts center. It holds a 50-year renewable lease with the State of New York, which owns the land, theaters and buildings that comprise the center. SPAC subcontracts with Live Nation, which organizes and presents the popular music and rock concerts every summer. The income derived from the Live Nation contract goes towards supporting the classical arts presentations.

== History ==
In early February 1961, Albany newspaperman Duane La Fleche noted a wire service report about a group hoping to entice the New York Philharmonic to make Stowe, Vermont its summer residence. La Fleche proposed that the group stay in New York State and perform in Saratoga Springs. Local civic, cultural, and legislative leaders, who had previously considered a Saratoga Arts Center an interesting possibility, began to design the facility. Within a week, they held their first meeting; within a month they were focusing on Saratoga Spa State Park as the site, had won the support of State Conservation Commissioner Harold Wilm, and began discussions with both the New York Philharmonic and New York City Ballet.

By summer 1963, contributions from Rockefeller Brothers Fund and New York State supplemented community support to create Saratoga Performing Arts Center. In June 1964, Governor Nelson A. Rockefeller mounted a bulldozer to break the first yard of ground. More than 410 workdays followed: 300 workers clocked 136,000 hours to complete the 5,103-seat, 10-story amphitheater (original layout of the venue did not include a festival lawn; the lawn, which holds 20,000, was added later).

Harry Belafonte was the first non-classical performer to perform at SPAC, in 1967. Then on September 1, 1968, the Doors gave a performance at SPAC, which began a tradition of bringing top pop and rock acts to the amphitheater including Jackson Browne (who recorded "Rosie" backstage in 1977), Whitney Houston (who filmed her televised MTV VMA performance of "I Wanna Dance With Somebody", as well as the official music video for "Didn't We Almost Have It All" on stage in 1987). Other notable pop-rock acts that have performed at SPAC include Chicago, The Who, Bon Jovi, Phish, Pretenders, Santana, Olivia Newton-John, Tina Turner, Guns N' Roses, Coldplay, Aretha Franklin, O.A.R., Rush, Demi Lovato, Kiss, Dave Matthews Band, Kings of Leon, blink-182, Fall Out Boy, Paramore, Aerosmith, Toby Keith, Train, Maroon 5, Britney Spears, Ray LaMontagne, Prince, 311, Missy Elliott, Pearl Jam, Jay-Z, Bruce Springsteen, Pink Floyd, Avril Lavigne, John Mayer, Nicki Minaj, Sheryl Crow, 50 Cent, Paul Simon, Selena Gomez, Tom Petty, Drake, the Cars, Snoop Dogg, the B-52's, Def Leppard, the Black Eyed Peas, Ray Charles, Dire Straits, Tori Amos, Christina Aguilera, the Beach Boys, 5 Seconds of Summer, Foreigner, Heart, Alter Bridge, Imagine Dragons, Ozzy Osbourne, Breaking Benjamin, Saint Asonia, Disturbed, Slipknot, Gojira, Three Days Grace, Chevelle, Journey, Wiz Khalifa, John Mellencamp, Elton John, Justin Bieber, Janet Jackson, Eric Clapton, Phil Collins, Steve Winwood and the Grateful Dead who performed at the Center in 1983, 1984, 1985, and 1988 (the June 18, 1983 SPAC show is considered one of their classics).

Farm Aid was held here in 2013 and 2024. Dave Matthews, John Mellencamp, Neil Young, and Willie Nelson headlined.

Past presidents of SPAC include Margaretta "Happy" Rockefeller and Lillian Bostwick Phipps. Currently, the President of the non-profit corporation also acts as the executive director.

== Present-day performances ==
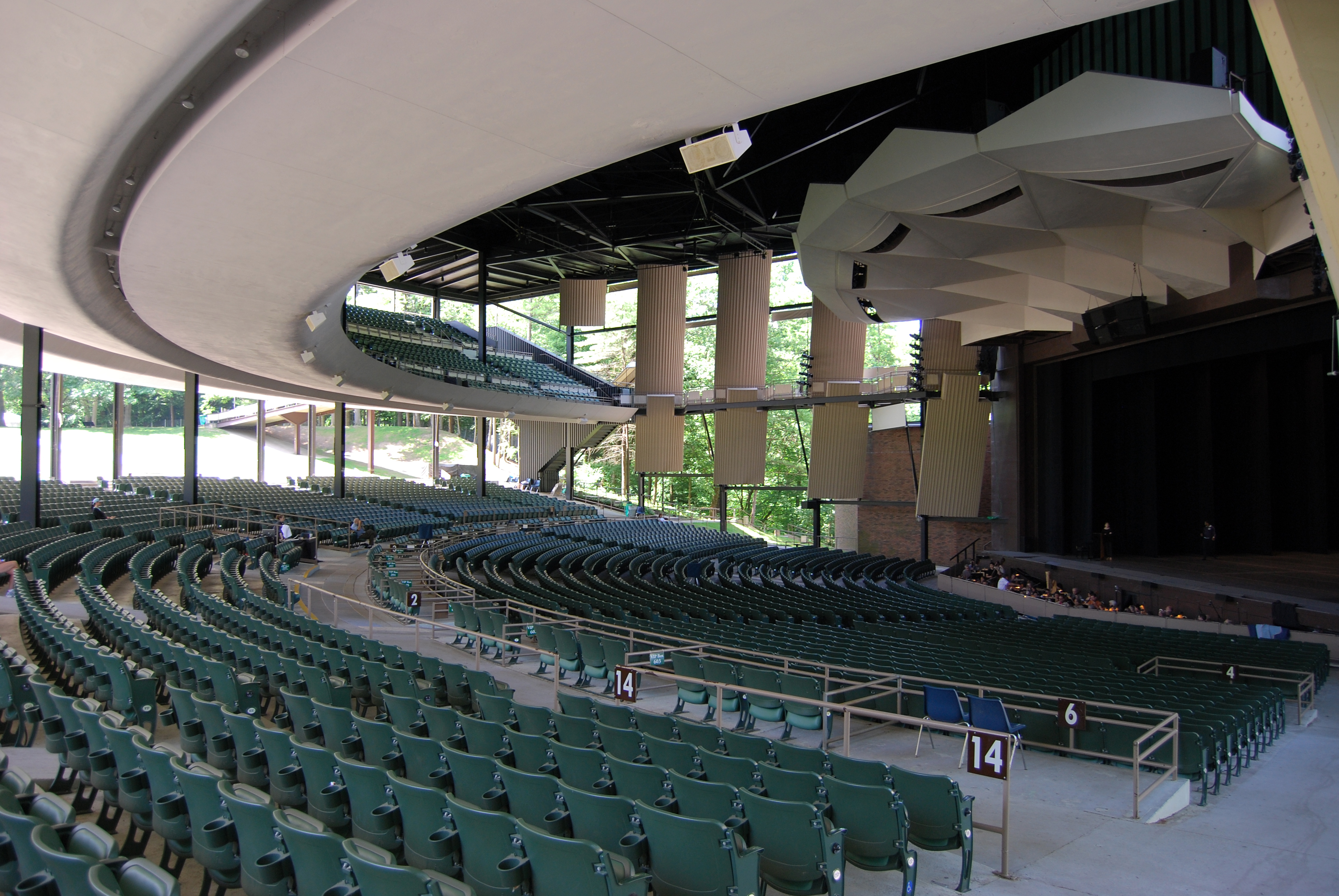
Interior of SPAC

SPAC has been the summer home for the New York City Ballet and The Philadelphia Orchestra for several decades. Well-known classical music soloists, such as Yo-Yo Ma, Gil Shaham, Yuja Wang, and Sarah Chang, annually perform major concerts at this venue.

The Philadelphia Orchestra's most well-attended performance is its annual Festive Fireworks performance, which includes the 1812 Overture and one or two well-known works.

A feature of each summer is the Jazz Festival, which presents major and emerging jazz artists on two stages.

The Chamber Music Society of Lincoln Center presents programs in the Spa Little Theatre.

SPAC is also a venue for non-classical concerts, which are booked exclusively by Live Nation.

Popular rock band Phish has played the venue 24 times beginning in 1992. The band has played at SPAC multiple times since its 2009 return including three-night runs in 2012, 2013, 2014, 2016, and 2025.

Sting performed during his Symphonicities Tour on July 31, 2010, along with the Royal Philharmonic Orchestra.

Dave Matthews Band has played at the venue a total of 48 times. They recorded the live album Live Trax 11 in 2000 and Live Trax 38 from June 8, 1996. The band has sold out more concerts than any other artist at the venue, with eleven.

For at least two decades, SPAC has hosted the School of Orchestral Studies (SOS) for the New York State Summer School of the Arts (NYSSSA) program. Approximately 115 high school-age students of NYSSSA's SOS attend concert performances during the summer as part of an intensive study of music performance, study with members of the Philadelphia Orchestra, and give a culminating performance in the amphitheater.

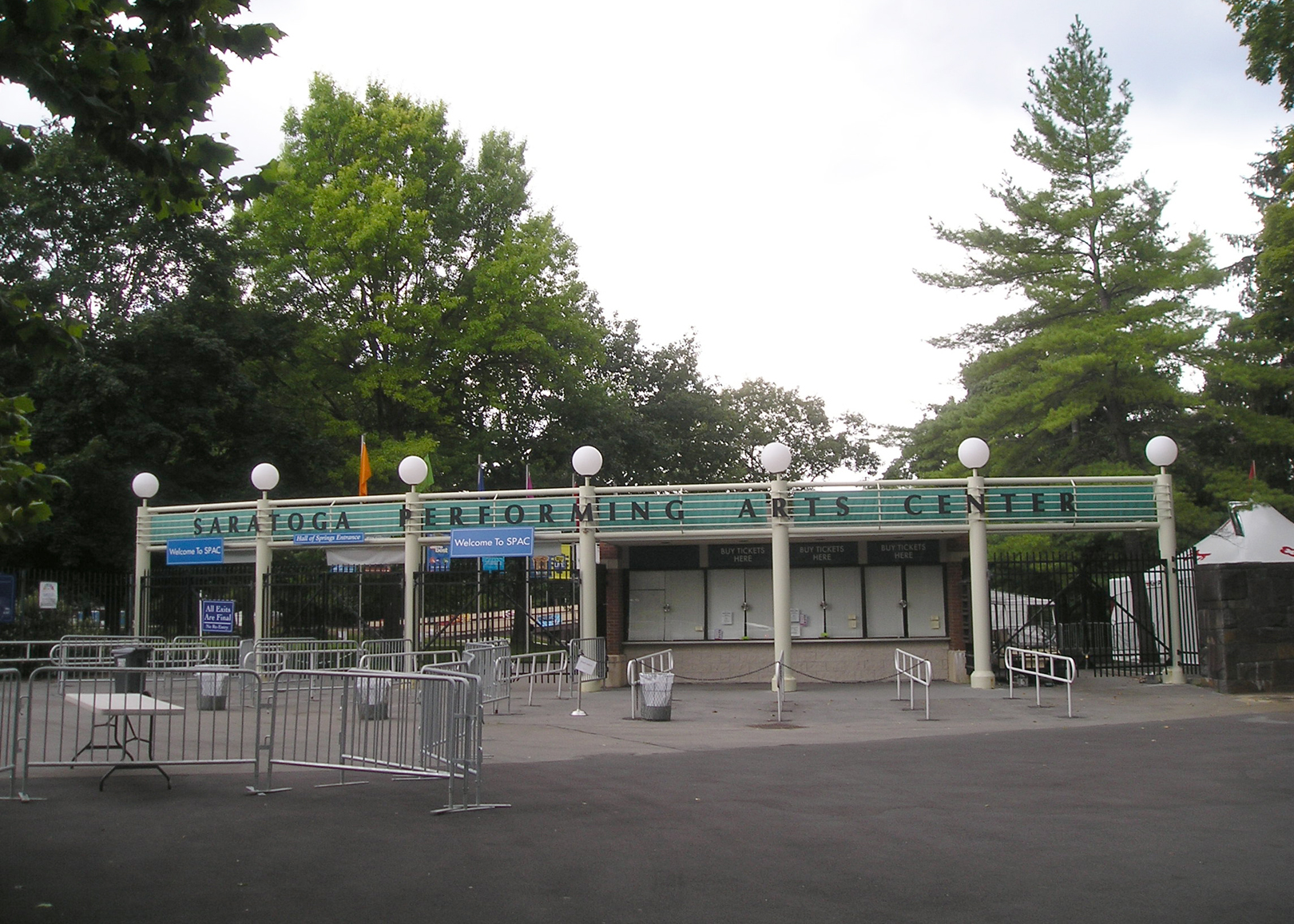
SPAC's entrance

SPAC is led by Elizabeth Sobol, chief executive officer, and Christopher Shiley, president. Over 200 seasonal employees keep the venue running through the summer season.

SPAC's largest attended performance in its history was by The Grateful Dead in 1985, where a total of 40,231 fans showed up to see the band. Since the show, SPAC limits its capacity to 25,103.

== Recent developments ==
In April 2025, SPAC promoted Christopher Shiley, its senior vice president of artistic planning, to president, with responsibility for programming and day-to-day operations; Elizabeth Sobol remained CEO. In December 2025 the New York State Office of Parks, Recreation and Historic Preservation, Empire State Development and SPAC announced the beginning of a $12 mln renovation of the Spa Little Theater at Saratoga Spa State Park, that became the first major renovation of the theater since foundation in 1935. In February 2026, Albany Med Health System was named presenting partner of Live Nation concerts at SPAC for the venue's 60th season.

== See also ==
- List of contemporary amphitheaters
- Live Nation
