= National Register of Historic Places listings in Saratoga County, New York =

Location of Saratoga County in New York

List of the National Register of Historic Places listings in Saratoga County, New York

This is intended to be a complete list of properties and districts listed on the National Register of Historic Places in Saratoga County, New York. The locations of National Register properties and districts (at least for all showing latitude and longitude coordinates below) may be seen in a map by clicking on "Map of all coordinates". Five of the properties and districts are further designated U.S. National Historic Landmarks.

This National Park Service list is complete through NPS recent listings posted August 21, 2026.

Contents: Counties in New York
Albany (Albany) – Allegany – Bronx – Broome – Cattaraugus – Cayuga – Chautauqua – Chemung – Chenango – Clinton – Columbia – Cortland – Delaware – Dutchess (Poughkeepsie, Rhinebeck) – Erie (Buffalo) – Essex – Franklin – Fulton – Genesee – Greene – Hamilton – Herkimer – Jefferson – Kings – Lewis – Livingston – Madison – Monroe (Rochester) – Montgomery – Nassau – New York (Below 14th Street, 14th to 59th Streets, 59th to 110th Streets, Above 110th Street, Islands) – Niagara (Niagara Falls) – Oneida – Onondaga (Syracuse) – Ontario – Orange – Orleans – Oswego – Otsego – Putnam – Queens – Rensselaer – Richmond – Rockland – St. Lawrence – Saratoga – Schenectady – Schoharie – Schuyler – Seneca – Steuben – Suffolk – Sullivan – Tioga – Tompkins – Ulster – Warren – Washington – Wayne – Westchester (Northern, Southern, New Rochelle, Peekskill, Yonkers) – Wyoming – Yates

== Listings county-wide ==
	Name on the Register	Image	Date listed	Location	City or town	Description
1	Arrowhead Casino Prehistoric Site	Arrowhead Casino Prehistoric Site	May 1, 2000 (#00000418)	Address Restricted	Saratoga Springs	Native American site dating back as far as 8,000-9,000 years ago.
2	Ballston Spa National Bank	Ballston Spa National Bank	August 12, 2025 (#100012106)	87 Front Street; 43°00′09″N 73°51′06″W	Ballston Spa	
3	Barker General Store	Barker General Store	April 1, 2002 (#02000303)	1 Military Rd. 43°13′18″N 74°06′16″W	Beecher Hollow	Historic general store constructed in 1847
4	Batchellerville Presbyterian Church		June 16, 2000 (#00000578)	County Route 7; 43°12′33″N 74°03′21″W	Batchellerville	Greek Revival Presbyterian church built in 1867.
5	Eli and Diadama Beecher House		December 22, 2015 (#15000924)	2 Military Road; 43°13′17″N 74°06′18″W	Beecher Hollow	1830 frame house of settlers who gave their name to surrounding hamlet of Beecher Hollow used as post office at one point
6	Col. Sidney Berry House	Col. Sidney Berry House	December 12, 2003 (#03001281)	725 W. River Rd. 43°12′46″N 73°35′08″W	Northumberland	Historic house built about 1800.
7	Abraham Best House	Abraham Best House	July 14, 2011 (#11000452)	113 Vischer Ferry Rd. 42°48′44″N 73°49′34″W	Vischer Ferry	Federal style house, built ca. 1815.
8	Broadway Historic District	Broadway Historic District	September 12, 1979 (#79001627)	Originally on Broadway, Washington and Rock Sts., later increased 43°05′12″N 73°47′01″W	Saratoga Springs	Commercial and residential core of city, with many buildings intact from 19th century
9	Brookside	Brookside	May 21, 1975 (#75001223)	Charlton St. 43°00′07″N 73°51′22″W	Ballston Spa	1793 house, modified later, was first built at springs for travelers. James Fenimore Cooper wrote part of Last of the Mohicans there. Now home to county historical society.
10	Bullard Block	Bullard Block	September 16, 2009 (#09000723)	90-98 Broad St. 43°05′56″N 73°34′54″W	Schuylerville	Commercial building built in 1881 in the High Victorian Gothic style.
11	Calvary Episcopal Church	Calvary Episcopal Church	January 17, 2017 (#100000498)	85 Lake Hill Rd. 42°54′36″N 73°53′30″W	Burnt Hills	Early Gothic Revival church built in 1849
12	Canfield Casino and Congress Park	Canfield Casino and Congress Park	June 19, 1972 (#72000910)	Roughly bounded by Spring and Circular Sts., Park Pl., and Broadway; 43°04′41″N 73°47′05″W	Saratoga Springs	Site of early bottling plant and hotel now used as public park and history museum. Designated a National Historic Landmark District on February 27, 1987.
13	Catawissa (tugboat)		August 8, 1996 (#96000828)	Lock 3, New York State Barge Canal, Erie Division; 42°47′57″N 73°41′22″W	Waterford	Tugboat built in 1896-1897 and scrapped in 2008.
14	Champlain Canal	Champlain Canal	September 1, 1976 (#76001274)	Extends north from Troy to Whitehall; 43°10′00″N 73°33′24″W	Troy	60-mile (97 km) canal connecting the south end of Lake Champlain to the Hudson River in New York constructed simultaneously with the Erie Canal.
15	Charlton Historic District	Charlton Historic District	January 1, 1976 (#76001271)	Main St. (NY 51); 42°56′02″N 73°57′55″W	Charlton	123-acre (50 ha) district at the hamlet of Charlton. Includes 37 contributing buildings dating to 1787 and includes notable Greek Revival and Italianate architecture.
16	Church Hill Historic District		May 20, 2021 (#100006512)	Terminal and Church Hill Rds. 42°49′27″N 73°43′56″W	Halfmoon	
17	Clifton Park Center Baptist Church and Cemetery	Clifton Park Center Baptist Church and Cemetery	September 24, 2004 (#04001055)	713 Clifton Park Center Rd. 42°51′31″N 73°49′55″W	Clifton Park Center	Baptist church and cemetery built in 1837.
18	Clifton Park Hotel	Clifton Park Hotel	June 18, 1998 (#98000705)	Old NY 146 and US 9; 42°51′57″N 73°46′15″W	Clifton Park and Halfmoon	Historic hotel erected in the 1820s.
19	Copeland Carriage Shop		May 25, 2018 (#100002513)	North Shore Road; 43°13′15″N 74°06′05″W	Beecher Hollow	Small 1830s Federal style wooden building is rare surviving example of a rural manufacturing facility, later used as machine shop and vacant since 1916.
20	Copeland Covered Bridge	Copeland Covered Bridge	August 6, 1998 (#98000998)	North Shore Rd., over Beecher Creek; 43°13′15″N 74°06′02″W	Edinburg	Wooden covered bridge
21	Crescent Methodist Episcopal Church		February 10, 2000 (#00000091)	Crescent; 42°49′29″N 73°43′53″W	Crescent	Methodist Episcopal church, built in 1852 and demolished sometime before 2013.
22	Davis-Ferris Organ	Davis-Ferris Organ	December 23, 2016 (#100000864)	2 Wesley Ave. 42°56′12″N 73°47′38″W	Round Lake	Oldest three-manual organ in the nation.
23	The Drinkhall	The Drinkhall	November 20, 1974 (#74001302)	297 Broadway; 43°05′06″N 73°47′45″W	Saratoga Springs	Historic trolley station built in 1915 by the Hudson Valley Railroad
24	Dunning Street Cemetery	Dunning Street Cemetery	February 23, 2015 (#15000033)	Dunning Street; 42°58′17″N 73°47′44″W	Malta	Final resting place of many important early Malta residents, including veterans of Revolutionary War, since 1775
25	Dutch Reformed Church of Gansevoort		January 20, 1995 (#94001568)	10 Catherine St. 43°11′56″N 73°39′06″W	Gansevoort	Dutch Reformed church, built about 1840 and demolished 1996.
26	East Side Historic District	East Side Historic District	October 29, 1982 (#82001267)	Roughly bounded by George, Henry, East, and North Sts. 43°04′49″N 73°46′41″W	Saratoga Springs	Intact residential area of well-to-do 19th century residents east of downtown.
27	Col. Elmer E. Ellsworth Monument and Grave	Col. Elmer E. Ellsworth Monument and Grave	November 13, 1976 (#76001273)	Hudson View Cemetery; 42°53′53″N 73°41′32″W	Mechanicville	Monument to Elmer E. Ellsworth, the first casualty of the American Civil War, built in 1874.
28	First Presbyterian Church of Ballston Spa		August 24, 2026 (#100013325)	22 West High Street; 43°00′03″N 73°51′01″W	Ballston Spa	
29	Franklin Square Historic District	Franklin Square Historic District	October 9, 1973 (#73001264)	In an irregular pattern from Beekman St. along both sides of Grand Ave., Franklin, and Clinton Sts. to Van Dam; 43°04′58″N 73°47′25″W	Saratoga Springs	Upscale area of Greek Revival housing later incorporated into West Side Historic District
30	Gansevoort Mansion	Gansevoort Mansion	June 23, 1976 (#76001272)	Off NY 32; 43°11′48″N 73°39′13″W	Gansevoort	House built in 1813 by Herman Gansevoort (1779–1862).
31	Nathan Garnsey House	Nathan Garnsey House	January 12, 2012 (#11001025)	1453 NY 146; 42°52′07″N 73°51′57″W	Rexford	Unaltered example of Federal architecture, ca. 1791.
32	Gideon Putnam Burying Ground	Gideon Putnam Burying Ground	December 12, 2003 (#03001279)	59 South Franklin Street; 43°04′42″N 73°47′30″W	Saratoga Springs	Early graveyard contains grave of city founder and his family. Only trace of him on the city's West Side.\
33	Grant Cottage	Grant Cottage	February 18, 1971 (#71000557)	CR 101 north of US 9; 43°12′03″N 73°44′45″W	Mount McGregor	Cottage first owned by banker Joseph W. Drexel. It was the site where Ulysses S. Grant died in 1885. It was designated a National Historic Landmark in 2021.
34	Grooms Tavern Complex	Grooms Tavern Complex	February 10, 2000 (#00000094)	Sugar Hill Rd. at Grooms Rd. 42°50′05″N 73°50′41″W	Grooms Corners	Historic tavern located at Grooms Corners. The complex consists of the 1825 tavern, a wagon and blacksmith shop, and a frame privy.
35	Hadley Mountain Fire Observation Station	Hadley Mountain Fire Observation Station	September 23, 2001 (#01001037)	Hadley Mountain; 43°22′26″N 73°57′03″W	Hadley	Historic fire observation station built in 1917.
36	Hadley Parabolic Bridge	Hadley Parabolic Bridge	March 25, 1977 (#77000981)	CR 1; 43°18′50″N 73°50′44″W	Hadley	Built in 1895. Only iron semi-deck lenticular truss bridge extant in state.
37	International Paper Administration Building and Time Office	International Paper Administration Building and Time Office	August 18, 2017 (#100001489)	17 Pine St. 43°14′51″N 73°49′04″W	Corinth	
38	Jonesville Cemetery	Jonesville Cemetery	April 7, 2014 (#14000132)	Ushers & Longkill Rds. 42°54′34″N 73°49′17″W	Jonesville	
39	Jonesville Store	Jonesville Store	January 14, 2011 (#10001136)	989 Main St. 42°54′37″N 73°49′24″W	Jonesville	Country store at Main Street and Longkill Road; now vacant.
40	Marshall House		August 22, 2002 (#02000878)	136 NY 32 North; 43°06′40″N 73°34′50″W	Schuylerville	Farmhouse constructed in 1770–1773 used by the British as a field hospital during the Battles of Saratoga.
41	Mead House		May 12, 2004 (#04000433)	2210 Galway Rd. 43°00′57″N 74°01′20″W	Galway	House built about 1825.
42	Mechanicville Hydroelectric Plant	Mechanicville Hydroelectric Plant	November 13, 1989 (#89001942)	At NY 32 on the Hudson River; 42°52′41″N 73°40′47″W	Mechanicville	Powerhouse, earth embankment, concrete non-overflow dam, and 700 feet long concrete gravity overflow dam built in 1897-1898.
43	Mohawk Valley Grange Hall	Mohawk Valley Grange Hall	April 3, 2012 (#12000245)	274 Sugar Hill Rd. 42°50′00″N 73°50′37″W	Grooms Corners	Grange hall built in 1791.
44	New York State Barge Canal	New York State Barge Canal	October 15, 2014 (#14000860)	Linear across county, along Mohawk River and Champlain Canal; 42°49′28″N 73°39′51″W	Clifton Park, Halfmoon, Mechanicville, Moreau, Northumberland, Saratoga, Schuylerville, Stillwater, Waterford	Successor to Erie Canal approved by state voters in early 20th century to compete with railroads
45	Northside Historic District	Northside Historic District	December 4, 1975 (#75001226)	Both sides of Saratoga Ave. (NY 32) from Maple Ave. to Roosevelt Bridge; 42°47′06″N 73°41′34″W	Waterford	District dating to 1828 characterized by large and small structures including the mansions of mill owners and modest workers' dwellings.
46	Noxon Bank Building	Noxon Bank Building	December 4, 2003 (#03001247)	9 Terminal Rd. 42°49′25″N 73°43′58″W	Crescent	Bank built in 1842.
47	Oakcliff	Oakcliff	June 1, 1998 (#98000548)	78 Church Hill Rd. 42°49′28″N 73°43′49″W	Crescent	Historic house built about 1840.
48	Old Saratoga Reformed Church	Old Saratoga Reformed Church	November 7, 1997 (#97001387)	Junction of Burgoyne and Pearl Sts. 43°05′54″N 73°35′05″W	Schuylerville	Reformed Church in America church built in 1857 in the Greek Revival style.
49	Ormsby-Laughlin Textile Companies Mill	Ormsby-Laughlin Textile Companies Mill	March 20, 1986 (#86000470)	31 Mohawk Ave. 42°47′18″N 73°41′00″W	Waterford	Textile mill built circa 1894; it is the only surviving factory associated with the major industrial community known as Dial City.
50	Parks-Bentley House	Parks-Bentley House	April 21, 1994 (#94000331)	53 Ferry Blvd. 43°18′00″N 73°37′27″W	South Glens Falls	House built about 1840.
51	Packer Farm and Barkersville Store		August 27, 2013 (#13000630)	7189 Barkersville Rd. 43°05′22″N 74°02′28″W	Middle Grove	Mid-19th century house moved to property and store built later are excellent examples of local vernacular architecture from the periods.
52	Peebles (Peobles) Island	Peebles (Peobles) Island	October 2, 1973 (#73001265)	At junction of the Mohawk and Hudson Rivers; 42°46′53″N 73°41′12″W	Waterford	
53	Petrified Sea Gardens	Petrified Sea Gardens	January 20, 1999 (#99000631)	42 Petrified Gardens Road; 43°04′59″N 73°50′40″W	Saratoga Springs	Site of discovery of stromatolites; New York State Paleontologist Winifred Goldring, a pioneering 19th-century woman in science, researched them extensively here.
54	Pure Oil Gas Station	Pure Oil Gas Station	October 18, 1978 (#78001905)	65 Spring St. 43°04′45″N 73°46′57″W	Saratoga Springs	Moved from Broadway to this address and adapted for reuse as a restaurant
55	David Rayfiel House		November 10, 2009 (#09000910)	1266 Kathan Rd. 43°18′01″N 73°56′31″W	Day	Modern Movement style house built in 1958.
56	Cyrus Rexford House	Cyrus Rexford House	January 14, 2011 (#10001135)	1643 NY 146; 42°51′20″N 73°53′21″W	Rexford	Stick Style Victorian house built in 1883.
57	Round Lake Historic District	Round Lake Historic District	April 24, 1975 (#75001225)	U.S. Route 9; 42°56′14″N 73°47′41″W	Round Lake	Notable collection of late 19th century structures which are remarkably homogeneous.
58	The Royal Blockhouse		January 31, 2012 (#11001062)	Address Restricted	Moreau	British fortification that was part of the Fort Edward/Rogers Island military complex during the French and Indian War.
59	Ruhle Road Lenticular Metal Truss Bridge	Ruhle Road Lenticular Metal Truss Bridge	September 4, 2004 (#04000954)	Ruhle Rd over Ballston Creek; 42°57′30″N 73°49′00″W	Malta	Lenticular truss bridge constructed in 1888 to span Black Creek in Salem
60	St. Stephen's Episcopal Church	St. Stephen's Episcopal Church	April 6, 2005 (#05000264)	1 Grove St. 43°05′48″N 73°35′02″W	Schuylerville	Gothic Revival style Episcopal church built in 1868.
61	Saratoga Gas, Electric Light and Power Company Complex	Saratoga Gas, Electric Light and Power Company Complex	May 1, 2001 (#00000579)	Excelsior Ave. 43°05′24″N 73°46′32″W	Saratoga Springs	Two buildings remain from early gas-generating power station started in 1873. Site also has archeological evidence of other buildings.
62	Saratoga National Historical Park	Saratoga National Historical Park	October 15, 1966 (#66000569)	30 miles (48 km) north of Albany via U.S. 4 and NY 32; 42°59′24″N 73°38′02″W	Saratoga	The park preserves the site of the Battles of Saratoga, the first significant American military victory of the American Revolutionary War in 1777.
63	Saratoga Spa State Park District	Saratoga Spa State Park District	September 12, 1985 (#85002357)	US 9 & NY 50; 43°03′20″N 73°48′01″W	Saratoga Springs	Renowned springs over only geysers in eastern U.S. made Saratoga a famous and popular resort
64	School No. 5 "The Little Red Schoolhouse"		December 10, 2025 (#100012371)	344 Moe Road; 42°50′25″N 73°47′39″W	Clifton Park	
65	Smith's Grain and Feed Store	Smith's Grain and Feed Store	May 8, 2012 (#12000260)	857 Main St. 42°53′35″N 73°49′16″W	Elnora	Coal yard and grain business of George Smith at Elnora railroad crossing.
66	Stillwater United Church	Stillwater United Church	September 28, 2006 (#06000887)	135 Hudson Ave. 42°56′20″N 73°39′15″W	Stillwater	Historic church designed by noted architect Marcus F. Cummings and built in 1873.
67	Hiram Charles Todd House	Hiram Charles Todd House	May 31, 1972 (#72000911)	4 Franklin Sq. 43°04′57″N 73°47′23″W	Saratoga Springs	1837 Greek Revival house near former site of railroad station
68	Union Avenue Historic District	Union Avenue Historic District	April 4, 1978 (#78001906)	Union Ave. 43°04′16″N 73°45′56″W	Saratoga Springs	Union Avenue includes a number of stately Victorian houses built in the second half of the nineteenth and early twentieth centuries.
69	Union Mill Complex	Union Mill Complex	June 17, 1982 (#82003404)	NY 50, Milton Ave. 43°00′33″N 73°51′04″W	Ballston Spa	Center of George West's paper-bag–making business. Later a chocolate factory and today a retail complex.
70	URGER (canal tugboat)	URGER (canal tugboat)	November 29, 2001 (#01001320)	Near the eastern terminus of the Erie Division of the New York State Barge Canal; 42°47′47″N 73°41′15″W	Waterford	Historic canal tugboat built in 1901.
71	US Post Office-Ballston Spa	US Post Office-Ballston Spa	November 17, 1988 (#88002468)	1 Front St. 43°00′08″N 73°50′58″W	Ballston Spa	1936 building in extremely restrained Colonial Revival style is like only one other post office in state
72	US Post Office-Saratoga Springs	US Post Office-Saratoga Springs	May 11, 1989 (#88002427)	475 Broadway; 43°05′00″N 73°47′08″W	Saratoga Springs	Ornate 1910 Classical Revival building once had most elaborate postal lobby in state
73	Verbeck House	Verbeck House	April 7, 1983 (#83001790)	20 Church Ave. 43°00′01″N 73°50′59″W	Ballston Spa	Rare late residence by Marcus F. Cummings. Later used as National Bottle Museum.
74	Victory Mills	Victory Mills	January 19, 2010 (#09001271)	42 Gates Ave. 43°05′21″N 73°35′31″W	Victory	Historic textile mill building built in 1918.
75	Vischer Ferry Historic District	Vischer Ferry Historic District	October 15, 1975 (#75001224)	Southwest of Clifton Park at the junction of River View, Vischer Ferry, and Crescent Rds. 42°47′41″N 73°49′12″W	Clifton Park	Located along the Erie Canal, the district contains several historic structures including the Nicholas and Eldret Vischer House, dating from the mid-1700s.
76	Waterford Village Historic District	Waterford Village Historic District	July 14, 1977 (#77000982)	Roughly bounded by the Hudson River, Erie Canal, and State St. 42°47′26″N 73°40′46″W	Waterford	The district dates to 1799 and includes Greek Revival, Late Victorian and Federal architecture.
77	West Charlton United Presbyterian Church	West Charlton United Presbyterian Church	February 20, 1998 (#98000127)	1331 Sacandaga Rd. 42°58′22″N 74°01′50″W	West Charlton	Presbyterian church built about 1880 by immigrants from Scotland.
78	West Side Historic District	West Side Historic District	April 4, 1994 (#94000258)	Roughly, along Church, Van Dam, State and Washington Sts., Woodlawn and Grand Aves. and Franklin Sq. 43°05′13″N 73°47′08″W	Saratoga Springs	Large intact residential area of working-class housing from 19th century
79	George West House	George West House	April 20, 2005 (#05000312)	801 NY 29; 43°03′59″N 73°55′38″W	Rock City Falls	Former home of industrialist and congressman George West
80	Wiggins-Collamer House	Wiggins-Collamer House	October 31, 2007 (#07001127)	450 E. High St. 42°59′47″N 73°47′28″W	Malta	Historic house built about 1835.
81	Yaddo	Yaddo	February 27, 2013 (#13000282)	63 Henning Rd. 43°04′05″N 73°45′29″W	Saratoga Springs	Former house of financier Spencer Trask and his wife, the writer Katrina Trask. Now an artists' colony.

== Former listing ==
	Name on the Register	Image	Date listed	Date removed	Location	City or town	Description
1	Ruhle Road Stone Arch Bridge	Ruhle Road Stone Arch Bridge	September 29, 1988 (#88001699)	September 4, 2004	Ruhle Road	Malta	Historic stone arch bridge in Malta in Saratoga County, New York over Ballston Creek. Constructed about 1873; collapsed in 1993.
2	Old Saratoga County Courthouse Complex		February 18, 1971 (#74002328)	April 25, 1974	46 W. High Street	Ballston Spa	Demolished in late 1971.

== See also ==
- National Register of Historic Places listings in New York
