= SUMC =

SUMC may refer to:

- Sony's Spider-Man Universe, also known as Sony's Universe of Marvel Characters, a media franchise
- Stanford University Medical Center, a medical hospital in California
- Sofia Urban Mobility Center, a public transport authority
- Shenendehowa United Methodist Church, a church in New York
- Springfield United Methodist Church, a church in Virginia
