= Joe Macken =

American miniature model maker

- Born: 1962 or 1963 (age 63–64); Queens, New York, U.S.
- Occupation: Miniature model maker

TikTok information
- Page: balsastyrofoam300
- Years active: 2025–present
- Followers: 285 thousand
- Last updated: June 10, 2026

Joe Macken (born 1962/1963) is an American miniature model maker. He is best known for handmaking a miniature model replica of New York City. He was dubbed as the "man who built New York City" by The New York Times.

Macken was born in Queens, New York. In 2003, he handmade a miniature model of New York City bridges out of popsicle sticks, wanting them to look "hybrid". He moved to Clifton Park, New York in 2004, where he handmade numerous miniature models in his basement. Aside from modeling making, he works as a truck driver.

In 2025, Macken's TikTok account went viral after he posted a video on the platform, showing off his handmade miniature replica of New York City, garnering over 10 million views. He handmade miniature models of the Empire State Building, the World Trade Center, 30 Rockefeller Plaza, the Chrysler Building, the Woolworth Building and many others. In 2026, his handmade miniature replica were put on display at the Museum of the City of New York in Manhattan, New York.
