= Joseph Dubois =

American silversmith (1767 - 1798)

Joseph Dubois, also spelled DuBois (July 9, 1767 - August 27, 1798), was an American silversmith, active in New York City.

Dubois was born in Monmouth County, New Jersey and married Sarah Van Dyck about 1796 in New York City, where he worked from 1789 to 1794 as a silversmith at 17 Great Dock Street, 1790 to 1793, and from 1794 to 1797 as a partner with Teunis Denyse Dubois at 87 Pearl Street. He died in New York City.

Dubois' work is collected in the Art Institute of Chicago, Metropolitan Museum of Art, Museum of the City of New York, and at the Henry Luce III Center for the Study of American Culture at the New-York Historical Society.
