= Michael Satterlee =

American entrepreneur

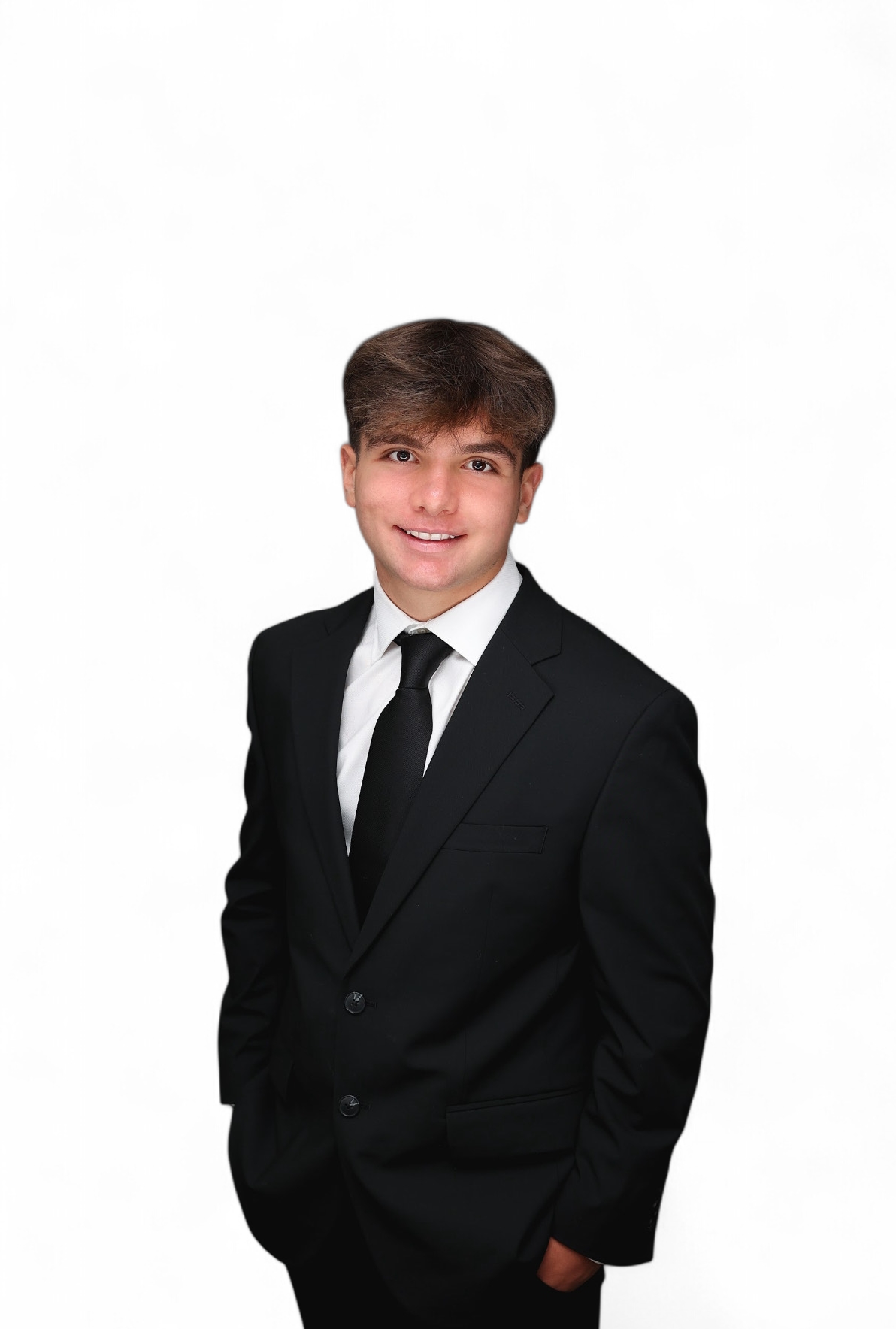
- Born: April 24, 2007 (age 19); Clifton Park, New York, U.S.
- Citizenship: American
- Occupation: Entrepreneur
- Known for: Founder of Cruise Cup; development of the Tactical Reload Can Cooler, SoleFully
- Website: solefully.com

Michael Satterlee (born April 24, 2007) is an American entrepreneur known for developing 3D-printed consumer products and accessories. His work has been covered by regional and national business media, particularly for his product development using desktop 3D printers.

== Early life ==
Satterlee was born in Clifton Park, New York. He attended local schools in the region and was introduced to desktop 3D printers during his early teenage years, sparking an interest in additive manufacturing technologies.

== Career ==
Satterlee founded an earlier 3D printing business called SoleFully, through which he produced and sold 3D-printed shoe accessories and other small items, using social media to generate product ideas and customer engagement.

Satterlee began using 3D printers as a teenager to design and produce consumer accessories and functional prototypes. His early designs included small household and hobby items that he produced on consumer-grade printers.

He later founded the company Cruise Cup, through which he developed and sold can coolers, including 3D-printed products. The brand primarily focuses on consumer beverage accessories, and its products have been distributed through online platforms.

=== Tactical Reload Can Cooler ===
In 2023, Satterlee designed a can cooler that holds two cans at once and ejects an empty can when another is inserted. The design was produced using fused filament fabrication (FFF) techniques and refined through multiple printed iterations.

The product underwent testing and revisions before being released to consumers in 2025. The device received coverage in multiple publications, largely due to its mechanical ejection mechanism and its distinctive design.

== See also ==
- 3D printing
- Entrepreneurship
- Consumer product
