= Clifton Gardens =

Clifton Gardens may refer to:

- Clifton Gardens, New South Wales, Australia
- Clifton Gardens, New York, United States
