= Shenendehowa High School =

Location
- 970 Route 146; Clifton Park, New York 12065; United States; 42.8621657°N 73.8004886°W

Information
- Other name: Shen High School
- Type: Public high school
- School district: Shenendehowa Central School District
- NCES School ID: 362667003640
- Principal: Ron Agostinoni
- Teaching staff: 217.71 (on an FTE basis)
- Grades: 9–12
- Enrollment: 3,036 (2022-2023)
- Student to teacher ratio: 13.95
- Campus size: 232 acres (0.94 km^{2})
- Campus type: Suburban
- Colors: Green and White
- Athletics conference: NYSPHSAA Class AA
- Mascot: Stallion
- Newspaper: The Shen Pen
- Yearbook: Carillon
- Website: shenhighschool.shenschools.org

Shenendehowa High School (often shortened to Shen High School) is a public high school in Clifton Park, New York, United States. It is part of the Shenendehowa Central School District.

Students are separated between two buildings (East and West) by their grade levels. Both buildings are located on the district's main campus off of NY 146. The recently expanded East building houses 10th through 12th graders, while the West building houses only 9th graders. It is the largest public school district in a suburban area in New York State.

== History ==
The original high school was built in the early 1950s, the building that is now Gowana and Acadia Middle Schools. Shenendehowa High School East began operation in 1970, teaching grades 9-12. Twenty-nine years later, in 1999, Shenendehowa High School West would open in the previous Koda Middle School building, to move grade 9 and half of grade 10 out of the east building. All of grade 10 would be introduced to the east building in 2004.

== Academic achievement ==
The school offers Advanced Placement (AP) classes.

The National Merit Scholarship Program recognizes high school seniors for high academic achievement. Recent Shenendehowa High School National Merit Scholar recognition numbers are presented in the table below.

National Merit	2003	2004	2005	2006	2007	2008	2009	2010	2011
Finalists	6	6	3	7	8	1	1	4	3
Semifinalists	6	6	3	7	9	1	1	4	0
Commended	14	23	11	18	18	12	9	13	11

About 90% of Shenendehowa High School students went on to attend 4-year (60%) or 2-year colleges (30%) from 2005 to 2008.

== Sports ==
Shen participates in Class AA of the New York State Public High School Athletic Association (NYSPHSAA) which is the largest classification in the state. They are the two time defending (2014–15, 2015–16) NYS Kerr Cup Champions, which is awarded by the state sportswriters association at the conclusion of every school year to the most successful athletic program in the state. Each of the last two years Shen has won by record margins each year. Shen has won 5 total national Championships in 3 sports. They won the 1993 and 1994 National Championship for Women's cross country. They have also won Soccer National Championships, one on the Woman's Varsity Team in 2004 and two in Men's in 1988 and 1991. Miles Joseph and Damian Silvera were on these teams, which won NY state championships in 1990 and 1991. The Men's Cross Country team has won 6 New York State Federation Championships. Their football team is also sponsored by Under Armour and the basketball team is sponsored by Nike. In 2015, 2016, and 2017 Shen won the NYSSWA All Sports Championship which is awarded to the NYSPHSAA school with the best performances in state and sectional championships. They hold the records for total points, margin of victory, and girls individual points. Shen has won a total of 42 team NYS state championships since the 1980s (25 boys, 17 girls). The school will usually have around 25-35 student-athletes sign letters of intent to play Division 1 or Division 2 college athletics each year with many more continuing careers at the Division 3 or Junior College level.

== Notable alumni ==
- Ian Anderson (2016), baseball player
- Kevin Huerter (2016), basketball player
- Miles Joseph (1992), soccer player
- Greg Koubek (1987), basketball player
- Tim Lewis, Olympic race walker
- Dan Peltier (1986), baseball player
- Pierre-Richard Prosper, attorney and former United Nations war crimes prosecutor
- Damian Silvera, soccer player
- Murphy Smith (2006), baseball player
- Chris Wyse, American bassist and vocalist best known for his work with Hollywood Vampires, Ace Frehley, the Cult, and Ozzy Osbourne
