= Shenendehowa United Methodist Church =

Church in New York, United States

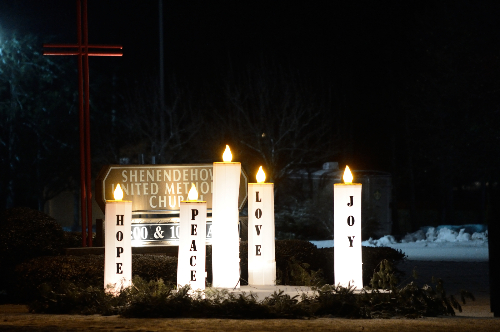
Outdoor advent wreath lit each night during the Christmas Season.

Shenendehowa United Methodist Church is a United Methodist church located in Clifton Park, New York on Route 146 directly across from the Shenendehowa Central School District's main campus. Shenendehowa UMC was founded in 1957 by merging four smaller churches in the area, Grooms, Crescent, West Crescent and Newtown. The first official service was held in 1959.

The church has roots back to 1788, when Grooms Methodist Episcopal Church was founded in the Vischer Ferry area, though John Wesley had been sending preachers to Halfmoon, NY and Newton, NY since 1783. The original Newton Methodist Church was founded in 1830, West Crescent in 1835, and Crescent Methodist Church in 1852. In 1957, members of these four Methodist churches of the Clifton Park area voted to merge, combining their membership to reach a total of 361 members.

The Shenendehowa UMC building has undergone three major renovations since its construction. Most recently, in 1997, a new sanctuary was built.

The current pastor at Shenendehowa United Methodist Church is Rev. Justin Hood, serving at SUMC since July 2024.
