= Ian Anderson (baseball) =

American baseball player (born 1998)

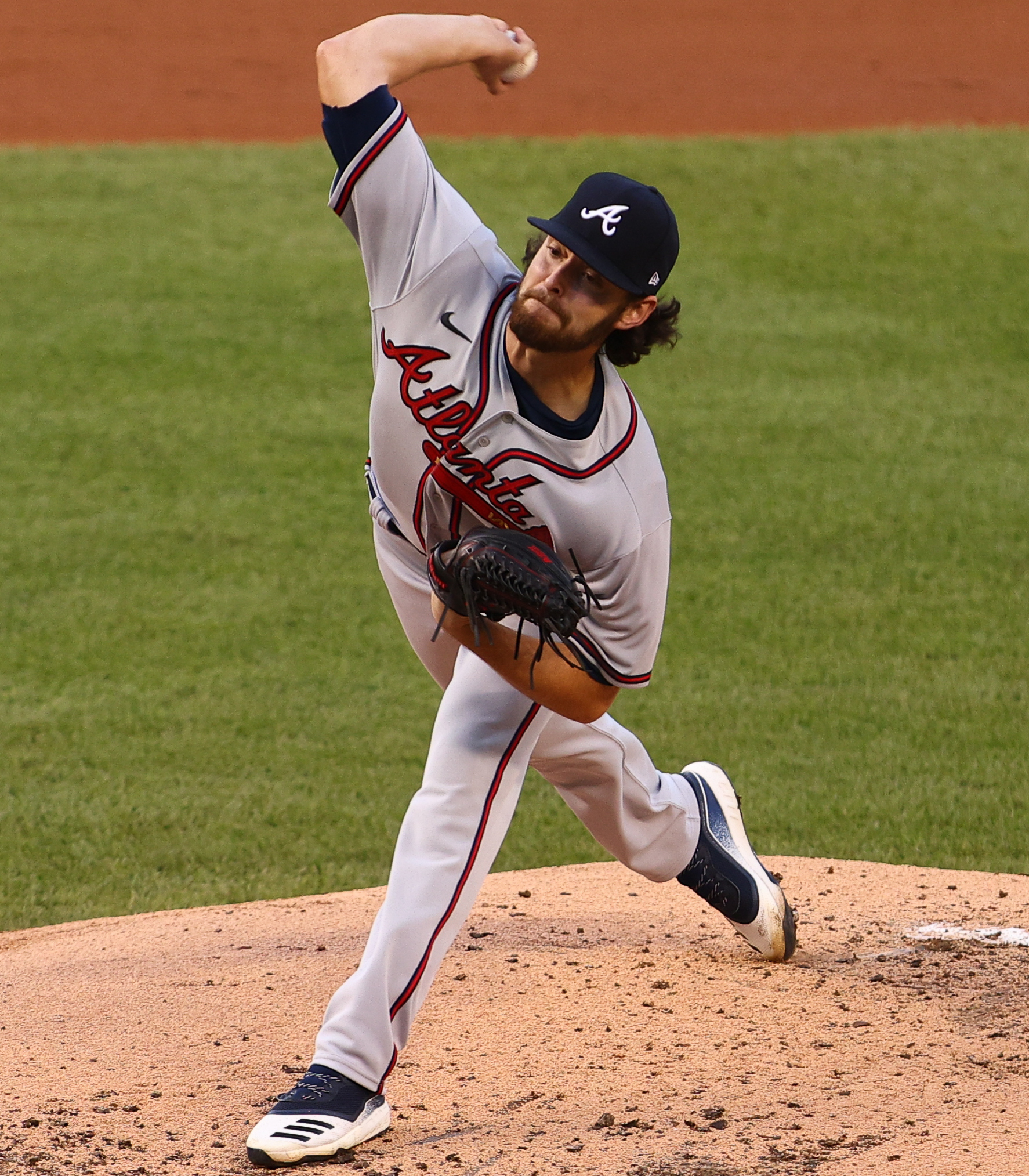
- Anderson with the Atlanta Braves in 2020

Free agent
- Pitcher
- Born: May 2, 1998 (age 28); Rexford, New York, U.S.
- Bats: Right Throws: Right

MLB debut
- August 26, 2020, for the Atlanta Braves

MLB statistics (through 2025 season)
- Win–loss record: 22–14
- Earned run average: 4.22
- Strikeouts: 270
- Stats at Baseball Reference

Teams
- Atlanta Braves (2020–2022); Los Angeles Angels (2025)

Career highlights and awards
- World Series champion (2021)
Medals
Men's baseball
Representing United States
U-18 Baseball World Cup
Gold medal – first place	2015 Osaka	Team

Ian Theodore Anderson (born May 2, 1998) is an American professional baseball pitcher who is a free agent. He has previously played in Major League Baseball (MLB) for the Atlanta Braves and Los Angeles Angels. Anderson was selected out of high school by the Braves with the third overall pick of the 2016 MLB draft, and made his MLB debut in 2020. Anderson won a World Series ring in 2021 as a member of the Braves.

== Amateur baseball ==
Anderson played in the 2013 14-and-under Babe Ruth League World Series in Moses Lake, Washington, with his team from Clifton Park, New York. Anderson's team finished third, and he was named to the all-defensive team as a pitcher. The squad was managed by Tom Huerter, father of teammate and future NBA player Kevin Huerter.

Anderson attended Shenendehowa High School in Clifton Park. As a junior, he was 6–1 with a 0.66 earned run average (ERA) and 91 strikeouts. In August 2015, he played in Perfect Game All-American Classic at Petco Park. That same summer, he played for the 18U National Team that won the World Cup. In 2016, he helped lead Shenendehowa to a Class AA state championship.

Anderson graduated from Shenendehowa in 2016. He committed to play college baseball at Vanderbilt.

== Professional career ==
=== Atlanta Braves ===
==== Minor leagues ====
Anderson was considered one of the top prospects in the 2016 MLB draft. To induce Anderson to forgo college baseball, the Atlanta Braves selected him with the third overall pick in the 2016 draft and signed him for $4 million.

Anderson made his professional debut with the Gulf Coast League Braves and was promoted to the Danville Braves on August 6, 2016. He finished the 2016 season with a combined 1–2 record and 2.04 ERA in ten starts between both teams. In 2017, he played with the Rome Braves where he went 4–5 with a 3.14 ERA in 20 starts. He began 2018 with the Florida Fire Frogs and was promoted to the Mississippi Braves on August 8. In 24 starts between the two clubs, he was 4–7 with a 2.49 ERA.

Anderson was invited to spring training before the 2019 season began, and returned to Mississippi to start the year. At midseason, he was selected as a Southern League All-Star, then subsequently named to the 2019 All-Star Futures Game. On August 5, Anderson was promoted to the Gwinnett Stripers, and made his International League debut the next day. At the end of the season, Anderson won the Braves' organizational pitcher of the year award.

==== Major leagues ====
Anderson was invited to spring training in 2020. Following the cancellation of the 2020 Minor League Baseball season due to the COVID-19 pandemic, the Atlanta Braves placed Anderson on its initial list of up to 60 players eligible to play for the team during the shortened Major League Baseball season. On August 26, 2020, Anderson was promoted to the major leagues for the first time, and his contract was selected to the active roster. He debuted in the first game of a doubleheader against the New York Yankees, going through the first 5 1/3 innings without yielding a hit. Anderson completed six innings, giving up one earned run on a home run by Luke Voit.

Anderson finished the 2020 season with a 3–2 record over 6 games started and 32 1/3 innings, posting a 1.95 ERA with 41 strikeouts, while giving up just 21 hits. He was fifth in the NL with 4 wild pitches. He relied mostly on his 95 mph fourseam fastball, 88 mph changeup, and 80 mph curveball, and only rarely threw a 92 mph sinker. Anderson received a single vote in National League Rookie of the Year voting, tying him for seventh place with Andrés Giménez and Sixto Sánchez.

On October 1, making his first postseason appearance, Anderson earned the win against the Cincinnati Reds, clinching the Wild Card Series for the Braves. He became the youngest pitcher in MLB postseason history to allow fewer than three hits while striking out nine while pitching at least six innings. In the NLDS game on October 7, Anderson threw 5.2 innings and got 9 strikeouts as the Braves beat the Miami Marlins 2–0.

In 2021, Anderson was 9–5 with a 3.58 ERA in 24 starts. He won a World Series ring as a member of the 2021 Braves. Anderson became the 2nd person in World Series history to leave a game after throwing five no-hit innings, accomplished during the 2021 World Series, in Game 3, striking out four Houston Astros batters and earning the win in the Braves' 2–0 victory. That year, he finished fifth in the 2021 Rookie of the Year voting.

Anderson struggled throughout the 2022 season, starting 21 games, and pitching to a 9–6 record, alongside a 5.11 ERA, until he was demoted to the Gwinnett Stripers on August 7. He issued an MLB-leading 53 walks up to that point in the season.

In 2023, after impressive spring training performances from Jared Shuster and Dylan Dodd, Anderson was optioned to Triple-A Gwinnett to begin the regular season. On April 11, 2023, it was announced that Anderson would undergo Tommy John surgery and miss the entire 2023 season.

Anderson was optioned to Gwinnett to begin the 2024 season as he continued his recovery from surgery.

=== Los Angeles Angels ===
On March 23, 2025, Anderson was traded to the Los Angeles Angels in exchange for José Suárez. In 7 appearances for Los Angeles, he struggled to an 0-1 record and 11.57 ERA with 8 strikeouts across 9 1/3 innings pitched. On April 24, Anderson was designated for assignment by the Angels.

=== Atlanta Braves (second stint) ===
On April 27, 2025, Anderson was claimed off waivers by the Atlanta Braves. On April 29, he was designated for assignment without making an appearance for the Braves. Anderson cleared waivers and was sent outright to the Triple-A Gwinnett Stripers on May 1. He made 12 starts split between Gwinnett and the Double-A Columbus Clingstones, accumulating a 1-7 record and 5.36 ERA with 38 strikeouts across 48 1/3 innings pitched. Anderson elected free agency following the season on November 6.

== Scouting report ==
As a prospect, Anderson's pitches included a mid-90s 4-seam and 2-seam fastball, plus curveball, and developing changeup. Anderson throws a 12–6 curveball with a low spin rate. In the minors, Anderson used his curveball more frequently against right-handed batters. By the time he reached the major leagues, Anderson's changeup had improved markedly. His arm angle has stood out to teammates, as it is higher than that of most pitchers.

== Personal life ==
Ian Anderson's identical twin brother, Ben Anderson, also played baseball for Shenendehowa and was drafted by the Toronto Blue Jays in the 26th round of the 2016 MLB draft. Ben opted to attend Binghamton University, where he played baseball for three seasons before being drafted by the Texas Rangers in the 13th round of the 2019 MLB draft. Anderson also has a younger brother named Isaac.

His father, Bob Anderson, played college baseball at Siena and won multiple New York State championships as a coach at Schalmont High School.

== See also ==
- List of baseball players who underwent Tommy John surgery
