= Clifton Knolls-Mill Creek, New York =

- Census-designated place
- Location within New York Location within the United States
- Coordinates: 42°50′49″N 73°48′28″W
- Country: United States
- State: New York
- County: Saratoga
- Town: Clifton Park

Area
  - Total: 1.64 sq mi (4.24 km^{2})
  - Land: 1.58 sq mi (4.10 km^{2})
  - Water: 0.050 sq mi (0.13 km^{2})
- Elevation: 280 ft (85 m)

Population (2020)
  - Total: 3,048
  - Density: 1,924.1/sq mi (742.89/km^{2})
- Time zone: UTC-5 (Eastern (EST))
  - Summer (DST): UTC-4 (EDT)
- ZIP Code: 12065 (Clifton Park)
- Area codes: 518/838
- FIPS code: 36-16322
- GNIS feature ID: 2806958

Clifton Knolls-Mill Creek is a census-designated place (CDP) within the town of Clifton Park, Saratoga County, New York, United States. It was first listed as a CDP prior to the 2020 census. As of the 2020 census, Clifton Knolls-Mill Creek had a population of 3,048.

The community is in southern Saratoga County, southeast of the center of Clifton Park. It is bordered to the north by Clifton Park Center Road, to the east by Moe Road, to the south by Grooms Road, and to the west by Vischer Ferry Road. The CDP of Clifton Gardens borders Clifton Knolls-Mill Creek to the east across Moe Road. The hamlet of Clifton Park Center is at the northwestern corner of the CDP.

Clifton Knolls-Mill Creek is 17 miles (27 km) north of Albany, 10 miles (16 km) east of Schenectady, and 19 miles (31 km) south of Saratoga Springs.

== Demographics ==
Historical population
Census	Pop.	Note	%±
2020	3,048		—
U.S. Decennial Census

=== 2020 census ===
As of the 2020 census, Clifton Knolls-Mill Creek had a population of 3,048. The median age was 42.3 years. 25.7% of residents were under the age of 18 and 18.1% of residents were 65 years of age or older. For every 100 females there were 98.6 males, and for every 100 females age 18 and over there were 95.2 males age 18 and over.

100.0% of residents lived in urban areas, while 0.0% lived in rural areas.

There were 1,041 households in Clifton Knolls-Mill Creek, of which 37.2% had children under the age of 18 living in them. Of all households, 72.2% were married-couple households, 8.2% were households with a male householder and no spouse or partner present, and 15.2% were households with a female householder and no spouse or partner present. About 14.2% of all households were made up of individuals and 10.0% had someone living alone who was 65 years of age or older.

There were 1,069 housing units, of which 2.6% were vacant. The homeowner vacancy rate was 1.3% and the rental vacancy rate was 4.1%.

Racial composition as of the 2020 census
Race	Number	Percent
White	2,576	84.5%
Black or African American	61	2.0%
American Indian and Alaska Native	4	0.1%
Asian	155	5.1%
Native Hawaiian and Other Pacific Islander	0	0.0%
Some other race	30	1.0%
Two or more races	222	7.3%
Hispanic or Latino (of any race)	138	4.5%
