= Clifton Park Hotel =

Historic hotel in New York, United States

- U.S. National Register of Historic Places
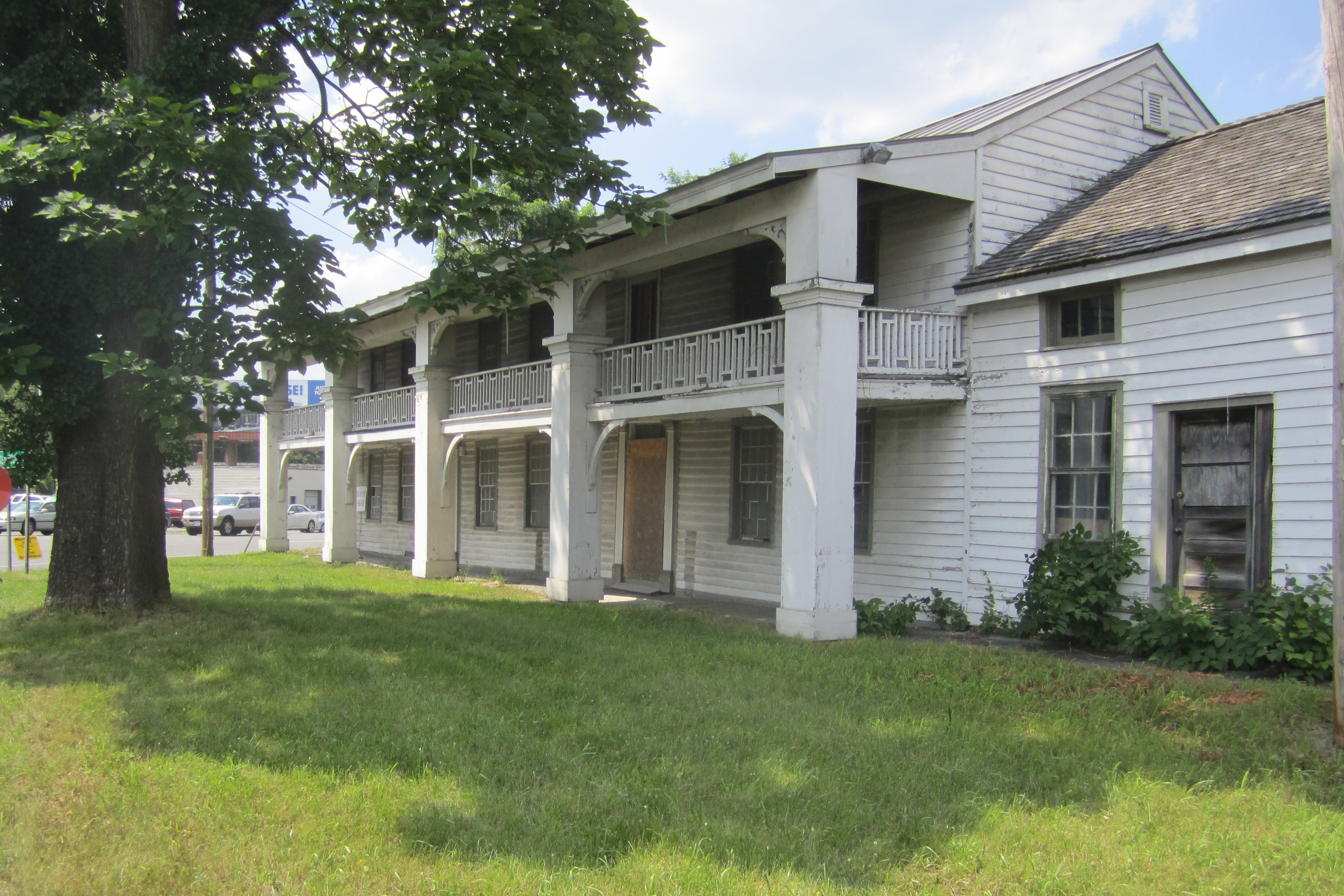
- Clifton Park Hotel, July 2013

- Location within New York Location within the United States
- Interactive map showing the location of Clifton Park Hotel
- Location: Old NY 146 and US 9, Clifton Park and Halfmoon, New York
- Coordinates: 42°51′57″N 73°46′15″W
- Area: 1.1 acres (0.45 ha)
- Architectural style: Greek Revival
- NRHP reference No.: 98000705
- Added to NRHP: June 18, 1998

Clifton Park Hotel is a historic hotel located at Clifton Park and Halfmoon in Saratoga County, New York. It was first erected in the 1820s and is a 2-story, timber-framed building sheathed in clapboards and topped by a gable roof. A massive, 2-story wood portico / piazza was added in the 1840s, along with a 1 1/2-story, two-bay, frame addition. The building was renovated in the 1880s and once featured a dance hall. The building exhibits a number of Greek Revival design features. It remained in commercial use into the 1970s.

It was listed on the National Register of Historic Places in 1998.

As of 2013 the building has been stabilized and re-roofed, but remains vacant.

The 30-acre site was acquired in 2025 by developer Bruce Tanski for redevelopment into senior apartments and a gas station, with the hotel preserved and restored as office space.
