= Kevin Huerter =

American basketball player (born 1998)

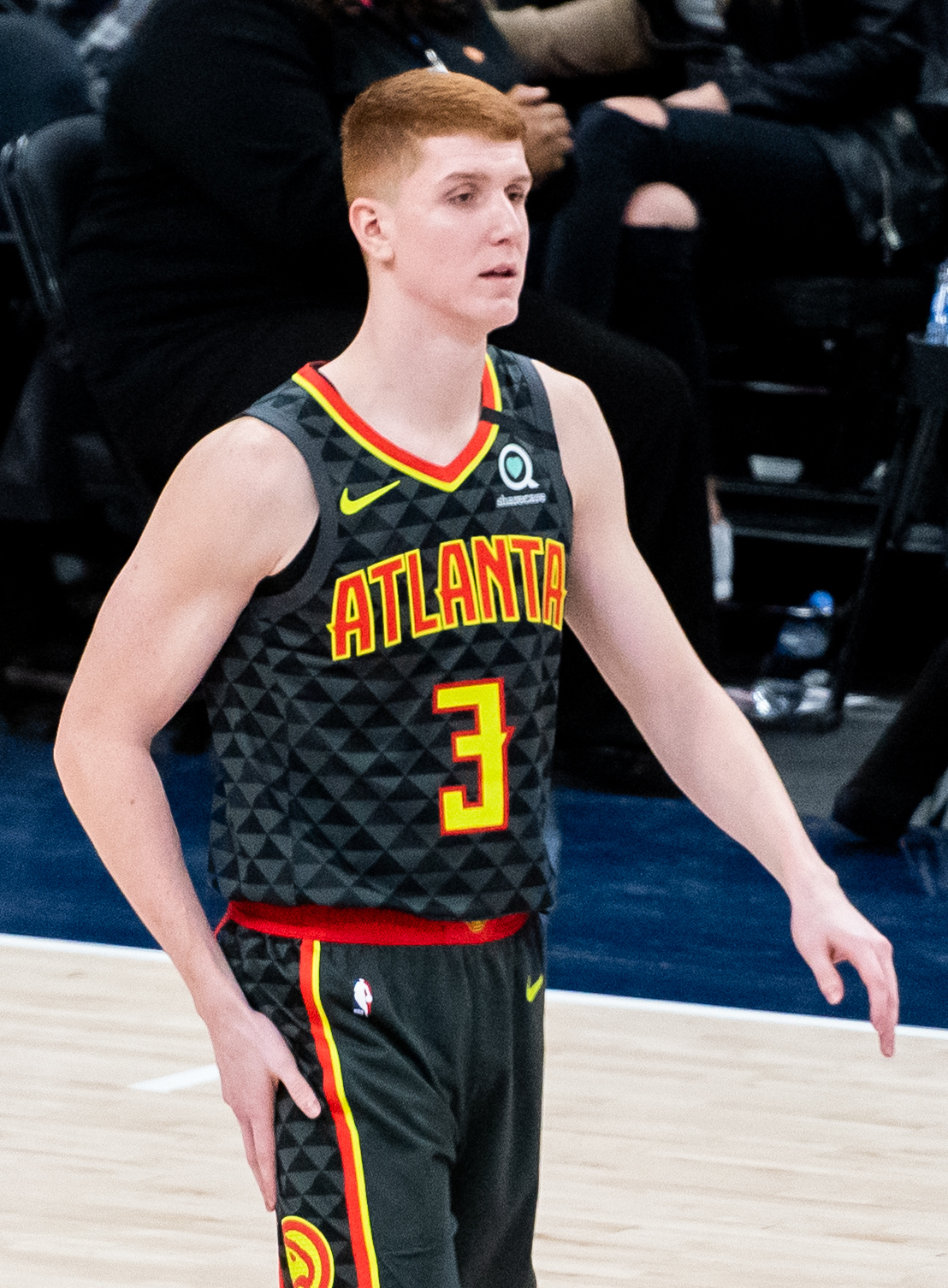
- Huerter with the Atlanta Hawks in 2020

No. 27 – Detroit Pistons
- Position: Shooting guard / small forward
- League: NBA

Personal information
- Born: August 27, 1998 (age 28) Albany, New York, U.S.
- Listed height: 6 ft 6 in (1.98 m)
- Listed weight: 190 lb (86 kg)

Career information
- High school: Shenendehowa (Clifton Park, New York)
- College: Maryland (2016–2018)
- NBA draft: 2018: 1st round, 19th overall pick
- Drafted by: Atlanta Hawks
- Playing career: 2018–present

Career history
- 2018–2022: Atlanta Hawks
- 2022–2025: Sacramento Kings
- 2025–2026: Chicago Bulls
- 2026–present: Detroit Pistons

Career highlights
- NBA All-Rookie Second Team (2019); Mr. New York Basketball (2016)
- Stats at NBA.com
- Stats at Basketball Reference
Medals
Men's basketball
Representing United States
FIBA U19 World Cup
Bronze medal – third place	2017 Egypt	National team
FIBA Americas U18 Championship
Gold medal – first place	2016 Chile	National team

Kevin Joseph Huerter (/ˈhɜːrtər/ HUR-tər; born August 27, 1998) is an American professional basketball player for the Detroit Pistons of the National Basketball Association (NBA). He played college basketball for the Maryland Terrapins and was selected by the Atlanta Hawks with the 19th overall pick in the 2018 NBA draft.

== High school career ==
Huerter, a 6 ft 7 in (2.01 m) shooting guard, played at Shenendehowa High School in Clifton Park, New York, a suburban town located in Saratoga County. During his career, he led the school to its second state championship and, as a senior, was named Mr. New York Basketball. He also played on the baseball team, and won the Class AA state championship in 2016 with future MLB pitcher Ian Anderson.

On September 7, 2015, Huerter committed to play college basketball for Maryland, choosing the Terrapins over 20 offers. By the end of his high school career, Huerter was considered a four-star recruit and was ranked No. 50 overall recruit and No. 11 shooting guard in the 2016 high school class.

College recruiting
Name	Hometown	School	Height	Weight	Commit date
Kevin Huerter; SG	Clifton Park, NY	Shenendehowa (NY)	6 ft 5 in (1.96 m)	170 lb (77 kg)	Sep 7, 2015
Kevin Huerter; SG	Recruit ratings: Rivals: 247Sports: ESPN: (86)				
Overall recruit ranking: Rivals: 59 247Sports: 85 ESPN: 50
Note: In many cases, Scout, Rivals, 247Sports, On3, and ESPN may conflict in their listings of height and weight.; In these cases, the average was taken. ESPN grades are on a 100-point scale.; Sources: "Maryland 2016 Basketball Commitments". Rivals.; "2016 Maryland Terrapins Recruiting Class". ESPN.; "2016 Team Ranking". Rivals.

== College career ==
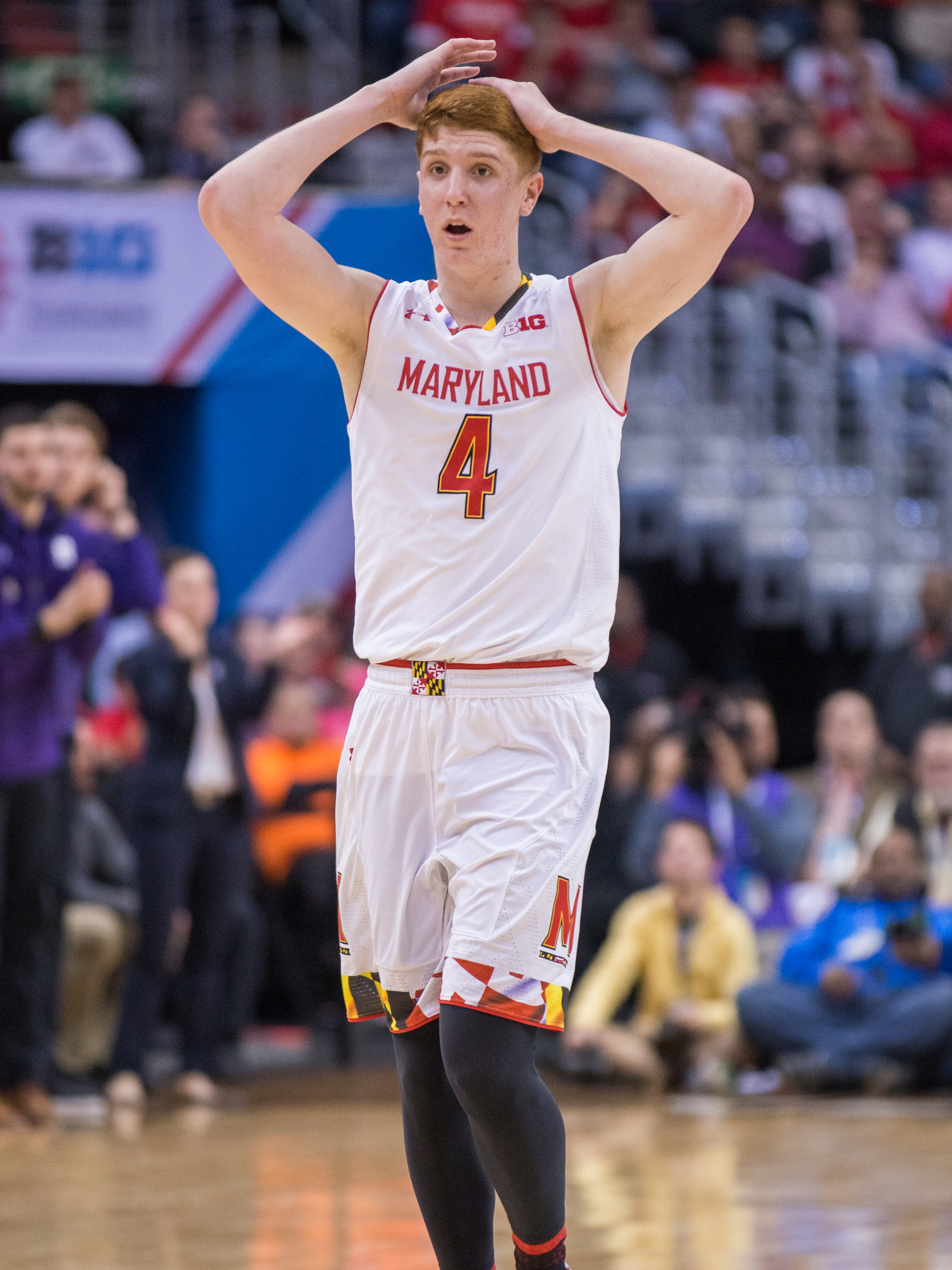
Huerter with Maryland in 2017

Huerter earned a starting position as a freshman, averaging 9.3 points and 4.9 rebounds per game on the season. Following his freshman season, he was selected to the United States team for the 2017 FIBA Under-19 Basketball World Cup, where the team finished third.

As a sophomore, Huerter increased his production, scoring 14.8 points and averaging 5 rebounds per game. At the close of the season, he was named honorable mention All-Big Ten.

== Professional career ==
=== Atlanta Hawks (2018–2022) ===
Following his sophomore season at Maryland, Huerter declared his eligibility for the 2018 NBA draft without an agent. He was selected to participate in the NBA Draft Combine. After working out with the Los Angeles Lakers, Huerter opted to hire an agent and remain in the NBA draft, forgoing his final two years of college eligibility on May 30, 2018.

On June 21, 2018, Huerter was selected with the nineteenth overall pick by the Atlanta Hawks in the 2018 NBA draft. On July 1, 2018, Huerter officially signed with the Hawks.

On December 31, 2018, Huerter's first 20-point game came against the Indiana Pacers, during which he scored 22 points in a 116–108 loss. On January 11, 2019, Huerter scored a season-high 29 points against the Philadelphia 76ers in a 123–121 victory. At the end of the 2018–19 NBA season, Huerter was voted to the All-Rookie Second Team.

Huerter with the Atlanta Hawks in 2020

In game 7 of the Eastern Conference Semi-Finals against the Philadelphia 76ers, Huerter scored a playoff career-high 27 points, to lead the Hawks to their first Eastern Conference Finals appearance since 2015.

On October 18, 2021, Huerter signed a four-year, $65 million rookie contract extension with the Hawks.

=== Sacramento Kings (2022–2025) ===
On July 6, 2022, Huerter was traded to the Sacramento Kings in exchange for Maurice Harkless, Justin Holiday, and a future first-round pick. On October 19, Huerter made his Kings debut, recording 23 points, three rebounds and two assists in a 115–108 loss to the Portland Trail Blazers.

On January 18, 2024, Huerter scored a career–high 31 points on 11–for–17 shooting in a 126–121 loss against the Indiana Pacers. On March 21, Huerter was diagnosed with a dislocated left shoulder and labral tear after suffering the injury in a game against the Memphis Grizzlies. On March 29, it was announced that he would undergo surgery to repair the injury, causing him to miss the remainder of the season as a result.

=== Chicago Bulls (2025–2026) ===
On February 3, 2025, Huerter was traded to the Chicago Bulls in exchange for Zach LaVine and a 2028 second-round pick to the Sacramento Kings, in a deal also involving the San Antonio Spurs. In 26 games (including 16 starts) for Chicago down the stretch, he posted averages of 13.2 points, 3.3 rebounds, and 3.2 assists.

Huerter made 44 appearances (11 starts) for the Bulls during the 2025–26 NBA season, averaging 10.9 points, 3.8 rebounds, and 2.6 assists.

=== Detroit Pistons (2026–present) ===
On February 3, 2026, Huerter was traded to the Detroit Pistons alongside Dario Saric for Jaden Ivey as part of a three-team trade that also involved the Minnesota Timberwolves swapping their 2026 first-round pick with Detroit and sending Mike Conley to the Bulls. He made 25 appearances (including three starts) for Detroit, averaging 8.6 points, 2.8 rebounds, and 2.5 assists.

On June 29, 2026, Huerter re-signed with the Pistons on a three-year, $27 million contract.

== Career statistics ==
Legend
GP	Games played	GS	Games started	MPG	Minutes per game
FG%	Field goal percentage	3P%	3-point field goal percentage	FT%	Free throw percentage
RPG	Rebounds per game	APG	Assists per game	SPG	Steals per game
BPG	Blocks per game	PPG	Points per game	**Bold**	Career high

=== NBA ===
==== Regular season ====
Year	Team	GP	GS	MPG	FG%	3P%	FT%	RPG	APG	SPG	BPG	PPG
2018–19	Atlanta	**75**	59	27.3	.419	.385	.732	3.3	2.9	.9	.3	9.7
2019–20	Atlanta	56	48	**31.4**	.413	.380	.828	**4.1**	**3.8**	.9	.5	12.2
2020–21	Atlanta	69	49	30.8	.432	.363	.781	3.3	3.5	**1.2**	.3	11.9
2021–22	Atlanta	74	60	29.6	.454	.389	.808	3.4	2.7	.7	.4	12.1
2022–23	Sacramento	**75**	**75**	29.4	**.485**	**.402**	.725	3.3	2.9	1.1	.3	**15.2**
2023–24	Sacramento	64	59	24.4	.443	.361	.766	3.5	2.6	.7	.4	10.2
2024–25	Sacramento	43	15	20.9	.413	.302	.714	2.8	1.7	.8	.4	7.9
2024–25	Chicago	26	16	30.0	.439	.376	.714	3.3	3.2	**1.2**	.3	13.2
2025–26	Chicago	44	11	23.6	.455	.314	.732	3.8	2.6	.8	**.6**	10.9
2025–26	Detroit	25	3	20.5	.443	.294	**.933**	2.8	2.5	1.1	.3	8.6
Career		551	395	27.4	.442	.368	.762	3.4	2.9	.9	.4	11.4

==== Playoffs ====
Year	Team	GP	GS	MPG	FG%	3P%	FT%	RPG	APG	SPG	BPG	PPG
2021	Atlanta	**18**	**10**	**31.0**	**.428**	.347	.706	3.8	2.8	.8	.9	**11.1**
2022	Atlanta	5	5	30.7	.362	.290	**.750**	3.0	**3.8**	**1.2**	.6	9.2
2023	Sacramento	7	7	26.2	.347	.205	**.750**	**4.4**	1.1	.4	**1.3**	9.1
2026	Detroit	5	0	9.2	.286	**.400**	—	1.0	1.4	.4	.0	1.2
Career		35	22	26.9	.395	.306	.724	3.4	2.4	.7	.8	9.0

=== College ===
Year	Team	GP	GS	MPG	FG%	3P%	FT%	RPG	APG	SPG	BPG	PPG
2016–17	Maryland	**33**	**33**	29.4	.420	.371	.714	4.9	2.7	**1.0**	**.7**	9.3
2017–18	Maryland	32	32	**34.4**	**.503**	**.417**	**.758**	**5.0**	**3.4**	.6	**.7**	**14.8**
Career		65	65	31.9	.466	.394	.749	5.0	3.0	.8	.7	12.0

== Personal life ==
Huerter was raised in Clifton Park, New York, by his parents Tom and Erin Huerter. He has a brother and two sisters. His father played college basketball for Siena College, and his brother has also played for them.

Huerter also played baseball as a child and is a fan of the New York Yankees. His Babe Ruth League team was coached by his father, and finished third at the 2013 14U World Series. Huerter was a teammate of Ian Anderson within the Babe Ruth League and high school baseball.
