= Davis-Ferris Organ =

- U.S. National Register of Historic Places
- U.S. National Historic Landmark
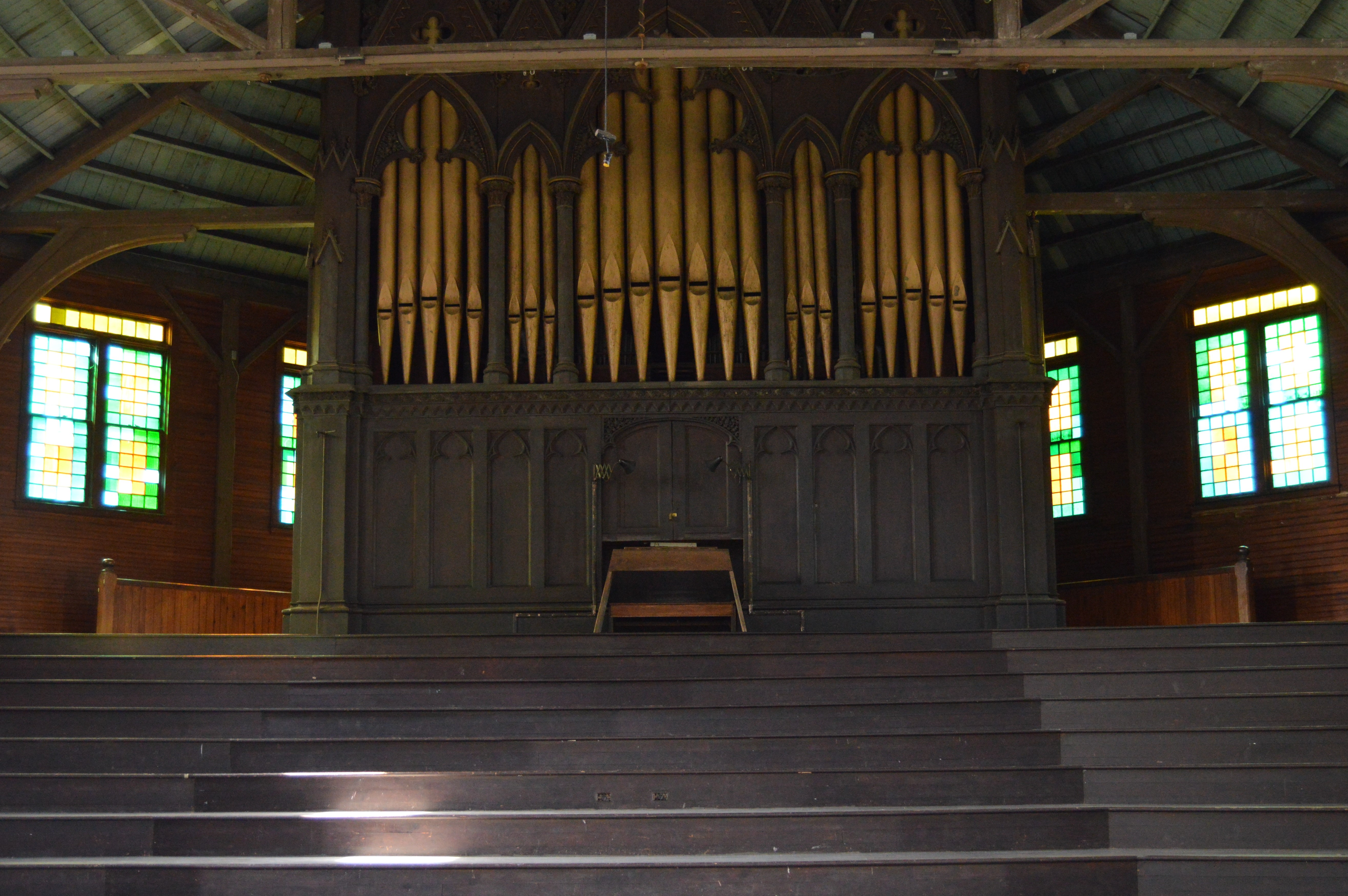
- Front view

- Location within New York Location within the United States
- Location: Round Lake Auditorium, Round Lake, NY
- Coordinates: 42°56′12″N 73°47′38″W
- Built: 1847
- NRHP reference No.: 100000864

Significant dates
- Added to NRHP: December 23, 2016
- Designated NHL: December 23, 2016

The Davis-Ferris Organ, built in 1847, is the oldest three-manual pipe organ that has escaped significant alteration in the United States. It is located in the Round Lake Auditorium in the village of Round Lake, New York. Originally located in the Calvary Church in Manhattan, it was moved to its present location in 1888, where it was used in Chautauqua-like summer programs into the 1920s. It is now owned and maintained by the village. It was designated a National Historic Landmark in 2016.

== Description ==
The Davis-Ferris Organ is basically a free-standing instrument, mounted in a wooden case with Gothic features. The case may have been designed by James Renwick Jr., the architect who designed the Calvary Church where it was first installed. The case measures roughly 24 by 16 by 23 feet (7.3 m × 4.9 m × 7.0 m), and is more of a protective enclosure than a structural supporting element of the instrument. It houses all of the working components of the instrument, including its three manuals, foot pedal board, air management system, and a network of wooden and metal pipes. Air movement is provided by an electric blower probably installed in the early 20th century, when the auditorium was electrified; before this time, the organ bellows were powered by a water-powered arrangement. The basic mechanical controls (stops, manuals, and the mechanisms they activate, are all basically original. Substantive changes to the instrument beyond the change in power source include the shortening of the longest pipes, needed to accommodate its new location, and it was likely revoiced after installation at Round Lake. Beginning in the 1970s, the instrument has been the subject of a long-running series of repairs to its condition, occasioned in part by a forty-year period of neglect.

The organ was built in 1847 by Richard M. Ferris for the Renwick-designed Calvary Church in Manhattan. Ferris was then briefly in partnership with William H. Davis, another organ builder, hence the name of the instrument. It remained in use at the church for about forty years, when the church vestry decided that the instrument was no longer compatible with its ecclesiastical practices. Around the same time in the 1880s, the Round Lake Methodist camp meeting was in decline as a religious venue and had been expanding its summer offerings to include more secular Chautauqua-like summer presentations and programming. In 1888, possibly stimulated by the acquisition of the organ or prompted by its availability, the Round Lake trustees began offering musical programs as well. The organ continued to a play a role in these until the association went into decline in the 1920s.

Interest in the instrument was revived in the 1960s, after which the village embarked on a continuing series of repairs, rehabilitation, and improvements of the instrument and the hall.

== See also ==
- List of National Historic Landmarks in New York
- National Register of Historic Places listings in Saratoga County, New York
