= Clifton Park Center Baptist Church and Cemetery =

Historic site in New York, United States

- U.S. National Register of Historic Places
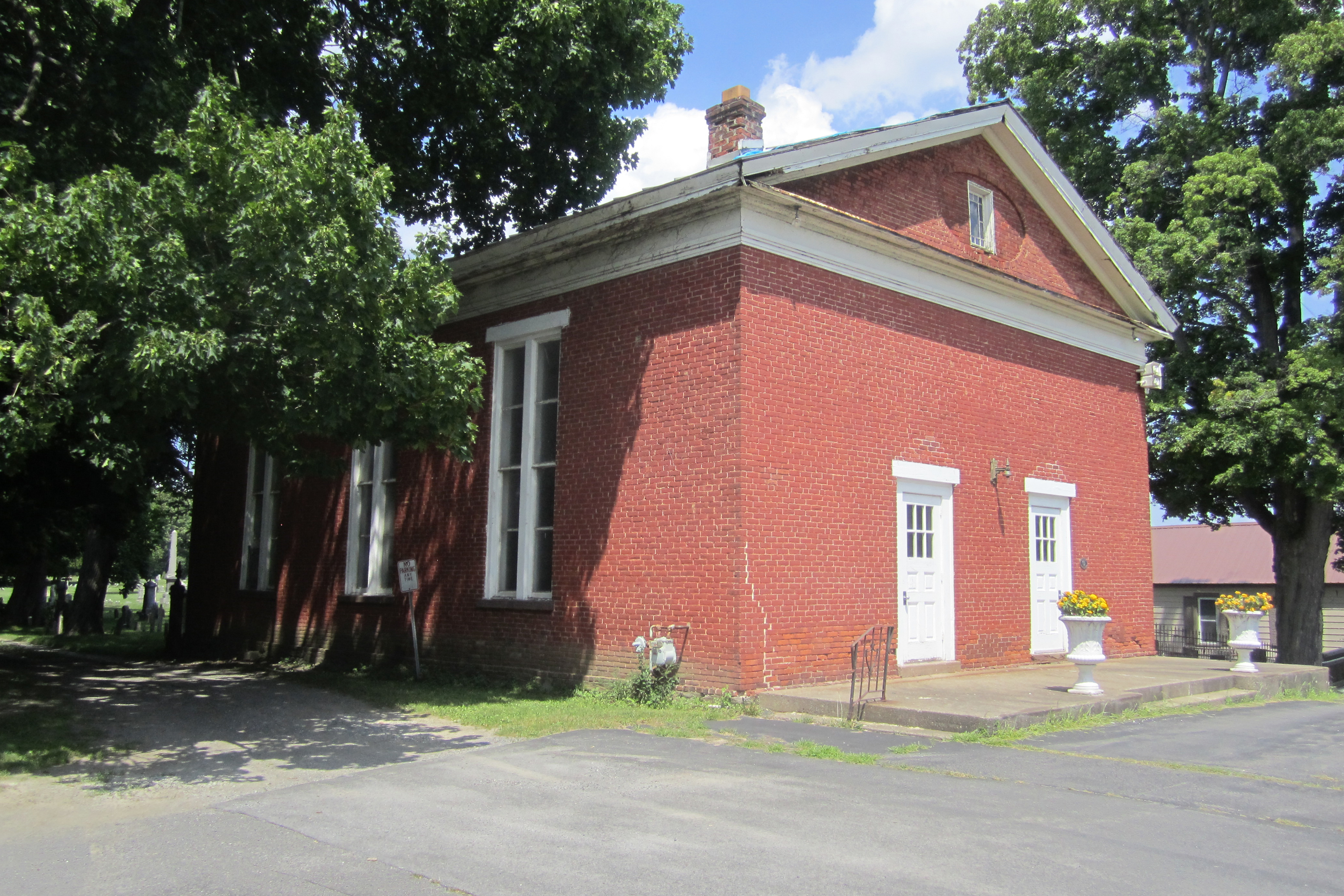
- Clifton Park Center Baptist Church, July 2013

- Location within New York Location within the United States
- Location: 713 Clifton Park Center Rd., Clifton Park Center, New York
- Coordinates: 42°51′31″N 73°49′55″W
- Area: 13.5 acres (5.5 ha)
- Built: 1794
- Architectural style: Greek Revival
- NRHP reference No.: 04001055
- Added to NRHP: September 24, 2004

Clifton Park Center Baptist Church and Cemetery is a historic Baptist church and cemetery at 713 Clifton Park Center Road in Clifton Park Center, Saratoga County, New York. It was built in 1837 and is a rectangular, gable-roofed brick church in a vernacular Greek Revival style. The adjacent cemetery is surrounded by a cast and wrought iron picket fence and gate. There are approximately 350 burials. The congregation was established about 1794 and the cemetery about 1801.

It was listed on the National Register of Historic Places in 2004.
