= Museum of the City of New York =

Local history and art museum in Manhattan

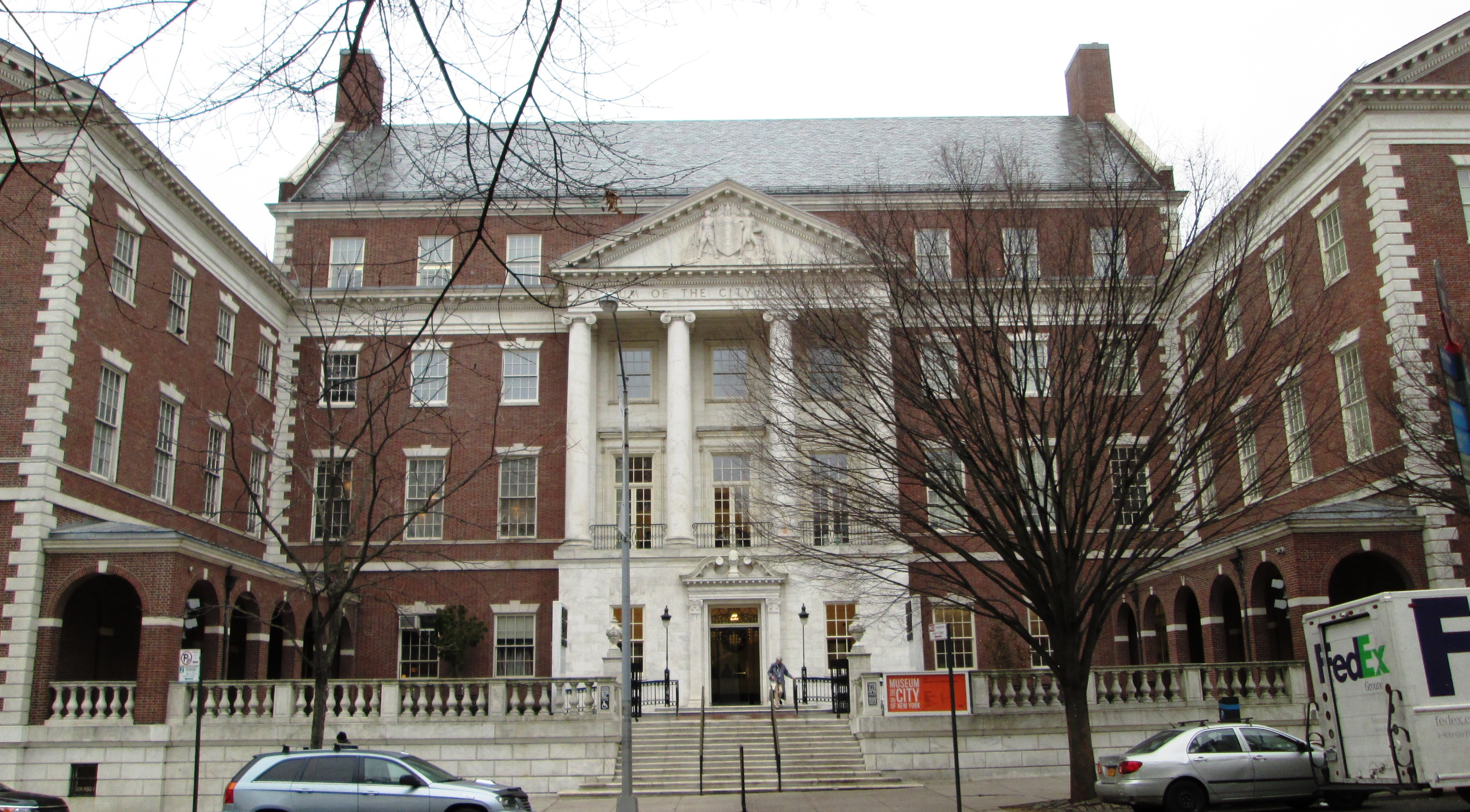
- The main facade of the museum, facing Fifth Avenue
- Established: 1923
- Location: 1220 Fifth Avenue; New York, NY 10029; U.S.
- Coordinates: 40°47′33″N 73°57′07″W
- Visitors: 320,000(2019)
- Founder: Henry Collins Brown
- Public transit access: New York City Subway: 103rd Street; 110th Street–Malcolm X Plaza; New York City Bus: M1, M2, M3, M4, M106 buses
- Website: www.mcny.org

The Museum of the City of New York (MCNY) is a history and art museum in Manhattan, New York City. It was founded by Henry Collins Brown in 1923 to preserve and present the history of New York City and its people. It is located at 1220–1227 Fifth Avenue between East 103rd to 104th Streets, across from Central Park on Manhattan's Upper East Side, at the northern end of the Museum Mile section of Fifth Avenue.

The red brick with marble trim museum was built in 1929–30 and was designed by Joseph H. Freedlander in the neo-Georgian style, with statues of Alexander Hamilton and DeWitt Clinton by sculptor Adolph Alexander Weinman facing Central Park from niches in the facade.

The museum is a private non-profit organization which receives government support as a member of New York City's Cultural Institutions Group. Its other sources of income are endowments, admission fees, and contributions.

== History ==
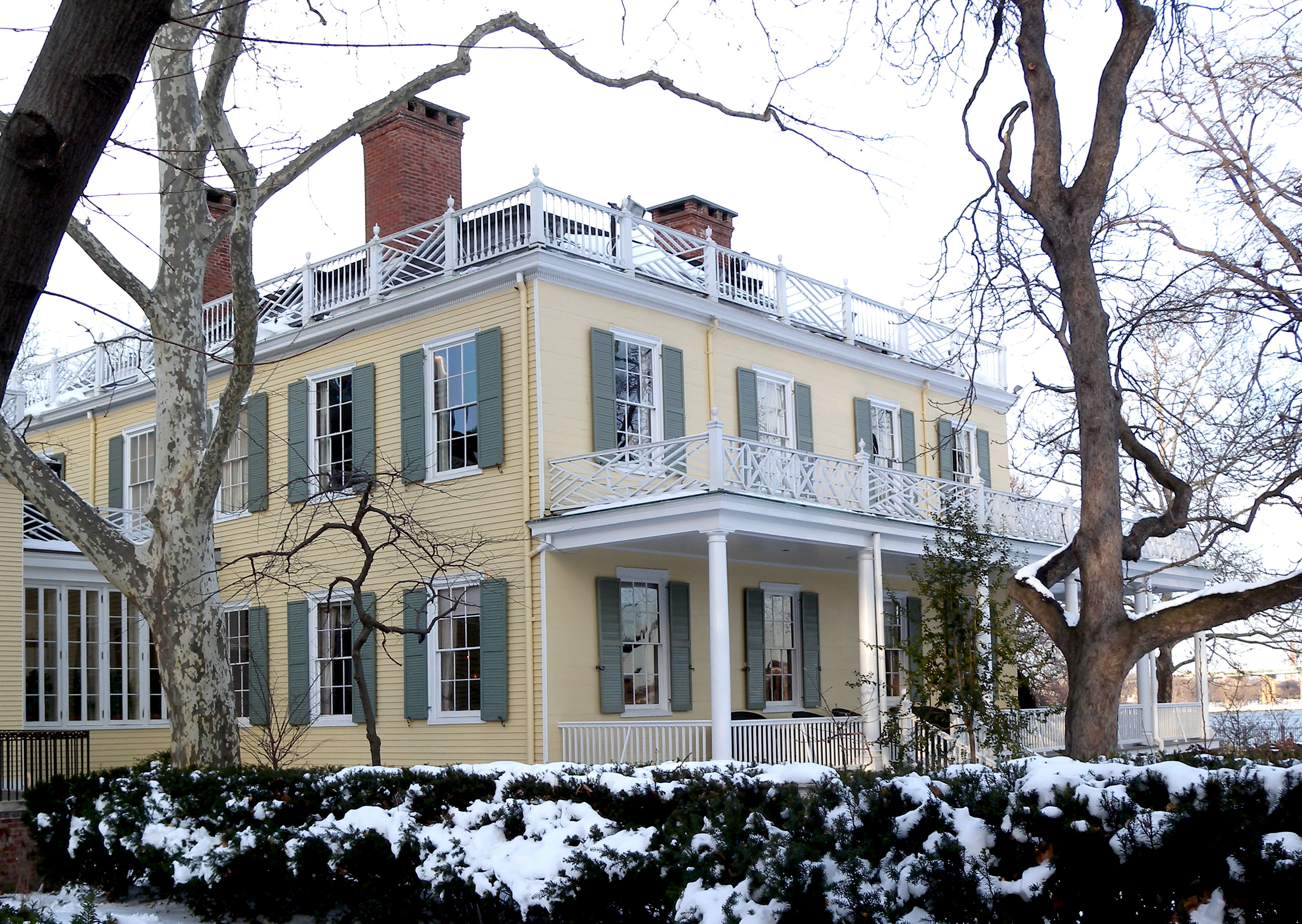
Gracie Mansion, the mayor's official residence, was the museum's first location

The museum was originally located in Gracie Mansion, where available space was limited. One of its first major exhibits was "Old New York", presented in the American Fine Arts Building on 57th Street in 1926. The success of the project led to a search for a new, permanent headquarters for the museum. A design competition was held between five invited architects, and the Colonial Revival design by Freedlander was selected. The city donated a site on Fifth Avenue, and funds for construction of the museum building were raised by public subscription. The original plans for the museum's building were scaled back as a result of the Wall Street crash of 1929, nevertheless, the building was dedicated on January 11, 1932.

On January 24, 1967, the museum building was designated a New York City landmark.

In 1982, the museum received The Hundred Year Association of New York's Gold Medal Award "in recognition of outstanding contributions to the City of New York."

=== Move proposals ===
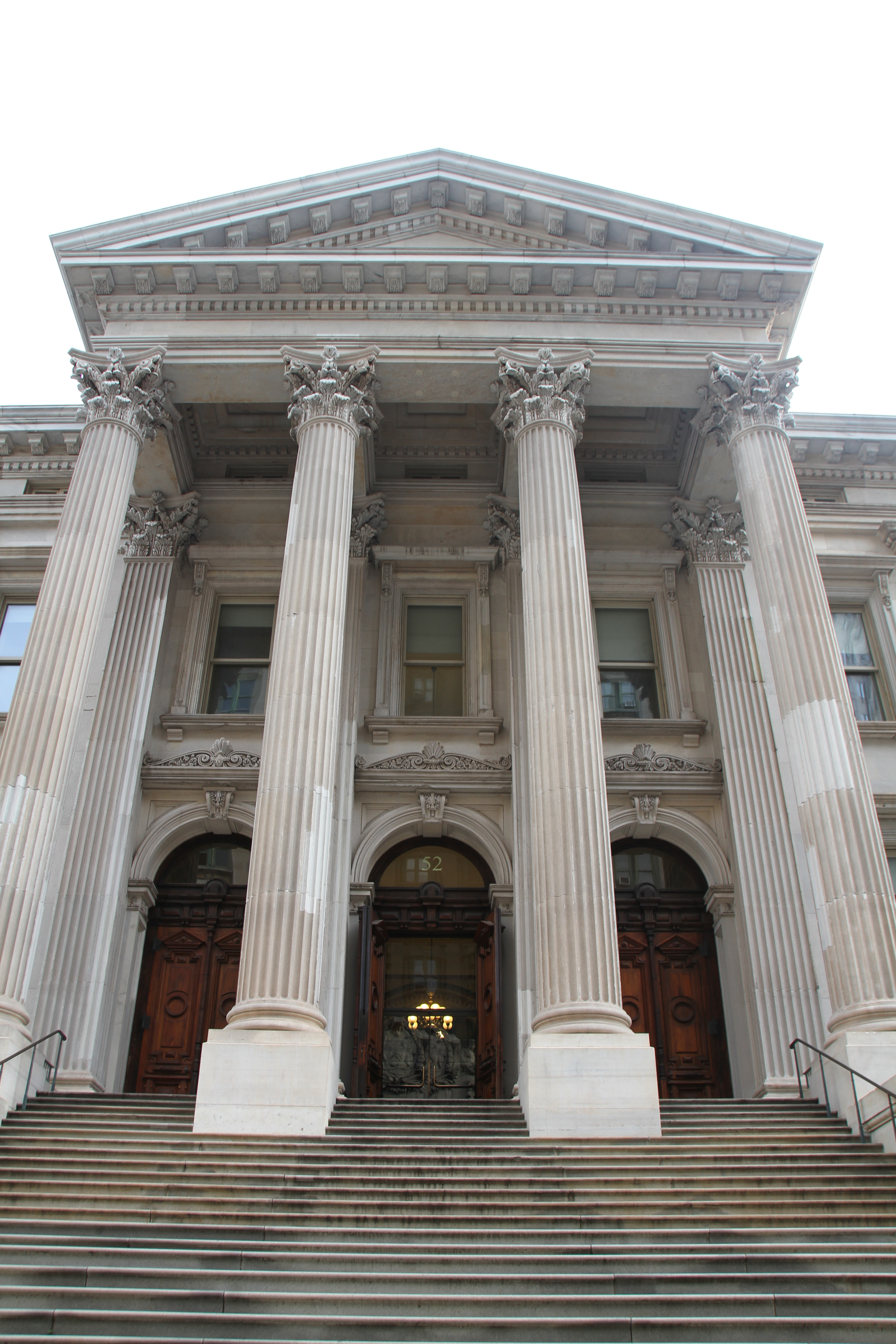
The main entrance to the Tweed Courthouse, which was proposed as a new home for the museum

In 2000, the administration of mayor Rudy Giuliani told the museum that it could relocate to the historic Tweed Courthouse near City Hall in Lower Manhattan. El Museo del Barrio would then have moved across the street to occupy the current Museum of the City of New York building. This decision was overturned by the incoming administration of Michael Bloomberg, which decided to use the Courthouse as the headquarters for the new New York City Department of Education, causing MCNY's then-director Robert R. McDonald to resign; he was replaced in 2002 by Susan Henshaw Jones, who was at the time the president of the National Building Museum in Washington, D.C.

There was also an attempt to merge the museum with the New-York Historical Society, which did not come to fruition, and the museum was passed over for space at the World Trade Center site.

=== Expansion ===
Museum director Susan Henshaw Jones recommitted MCNY to its East Harlem neighborhood by planning an extension to the museum. The groundbreaking for this extension, which included renovation of existing gallery space, as well as a new pavilion, took place on August 2, 2006, and it was completed in February 2008 with a ribbon cutting later that same year.

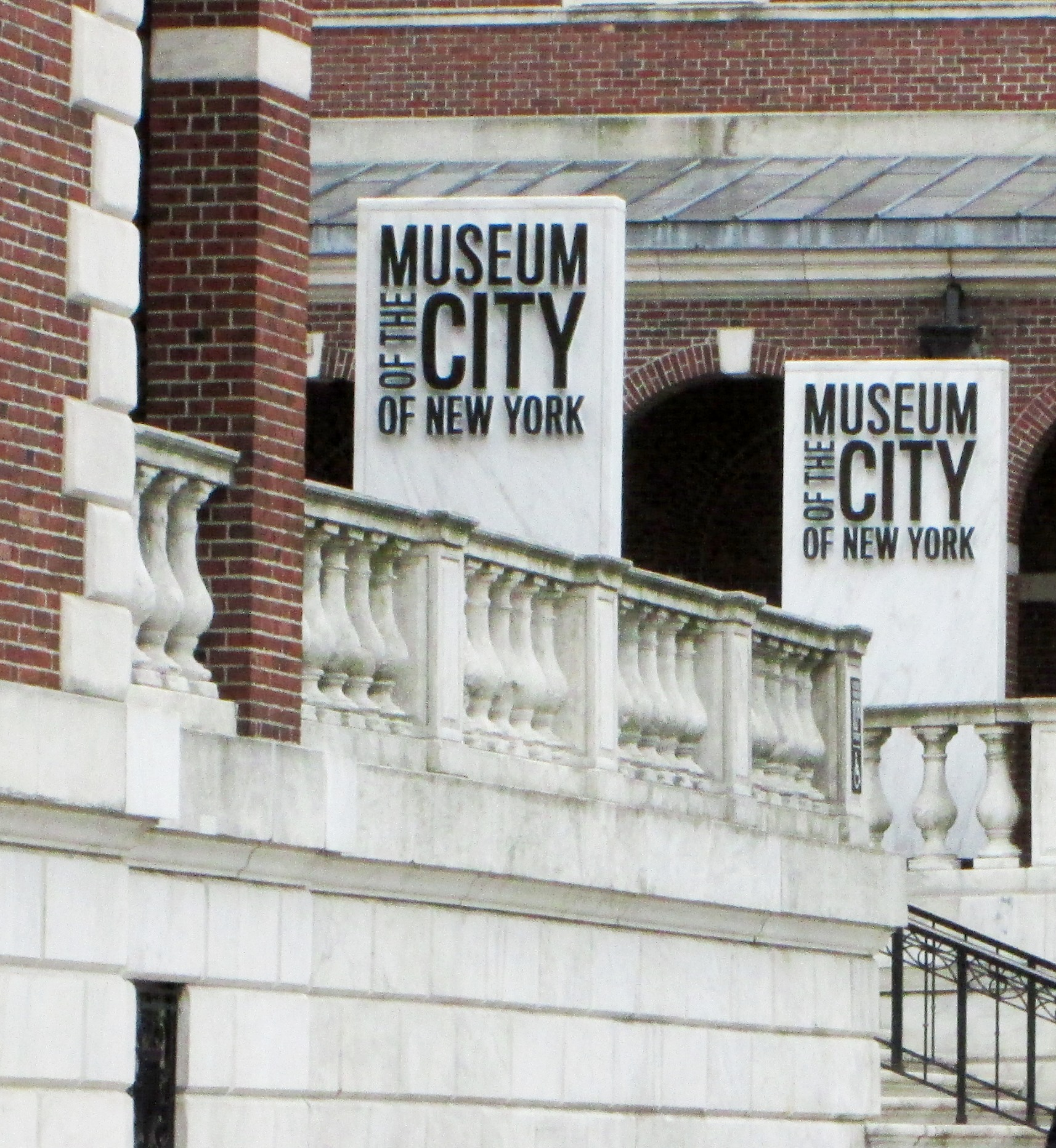
Signs at the museum's entrance

The pavilion gallery, designed by the Polshek Partnership, is 3,000-square-foot (280 m^{2}) glass addition, which has two levels at which to display artifacts. The original 1932 Georgian Revival building was also restored during this project, and additions were made including a vault for the museum's silver collection, a research room and a room for the handling of artifacts. The total costs for the first phase of refurbishments came to US$28 million.

In late 2011, the museum temporarily took over operation of the South Street Seaport Museum which reopened in January 2012.

== Collection ==
The museum's collection of over 1.5 million items – which is particularly strong in objects dating from the 19th and early 20th centuries – includes paintings, drawings, prints, including over 3000 by Currier and Ives, and photographs featuring New York City and its residents, as well as costumes, decorative objects and furniture, antique toys – the museum was the first in the United States to establish a curatorial department for toys – ship models, rare books and manuscripts, marine and military collections, police and fire collections, and a theater collection which documents the golden age of Broadway theater. There are also dioramas about the city's history and its physical environment. The museum also has a collection of original Marquand and Co. silver from the early 19th century.

Among the rare items in the museum's collection is a chair that once belonged to Sarah Rapelje, daughter of Joris Jansen Rapelje of Nieuw Amsterdam, and said to be the first child born in New York State of European parentage. The chair was donated by her Brinckerhoff descendants.

The museum is known for its comprehensive collection of photographic images, which includes works by noted photographers Percy Byron, Jacob Riis and Berenice Abbott, as well as many Depression-era Federal Art Project photographs. The collection also includes still photography by film director Stanley Kubrick.

MCNY was also the longtime home to recreations of two furnished rooms from the house of John D. Rockefeller, donated by the Rockefeller family. In 2008, the museum disposed of the rooms, donating one to the Metropolitan Museum of Art and the other to the Virginia Museum of Fine Arts. Notable as well is a model of New Amsterdam based on the Castello Plan of 1660.

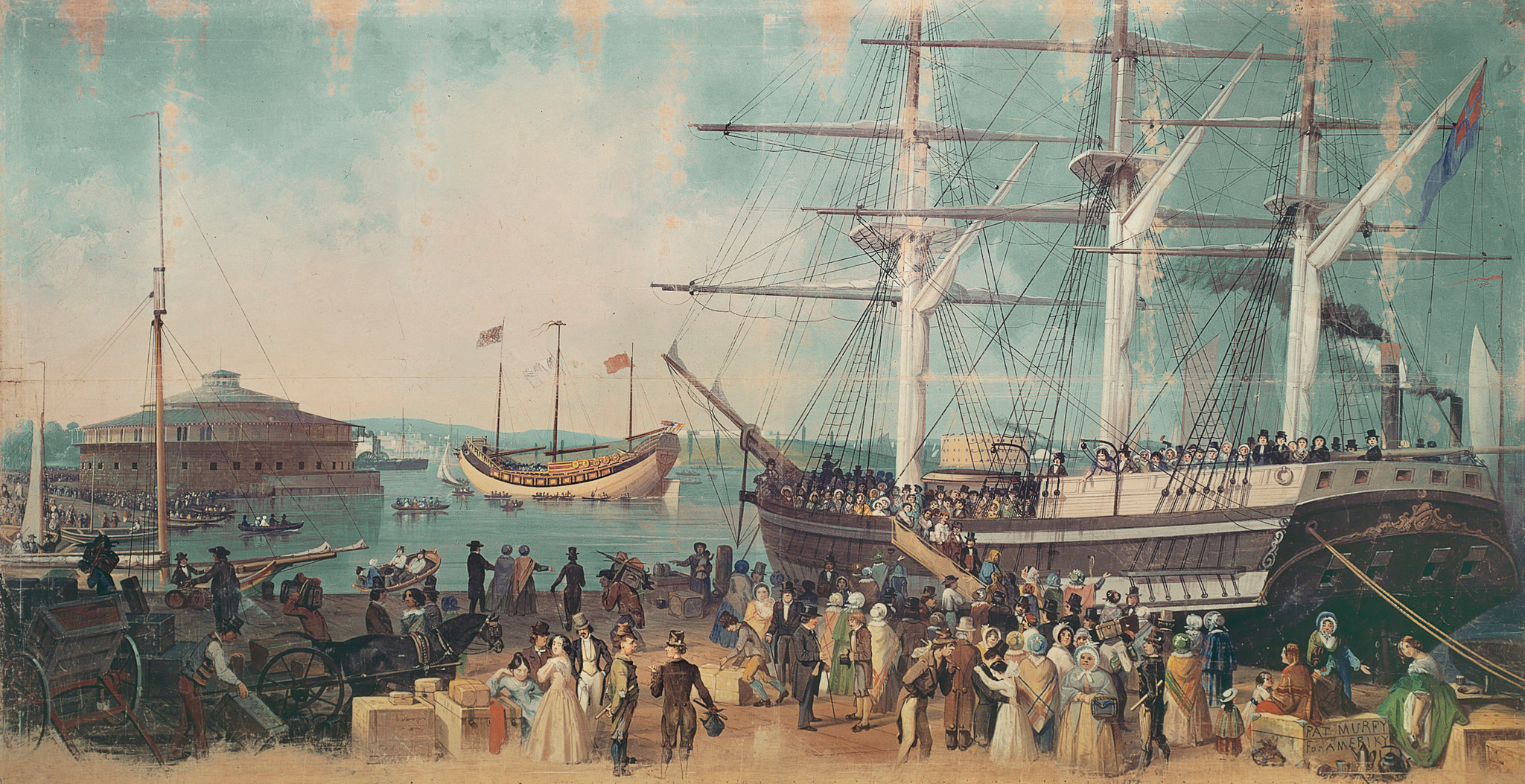
"The Bay and Harbor of New York" by Samuel Waugh (1814–1885), depicting the arrival of the Junk Keying in New York harbour in July 1847 (watercolor on canvas, c.1853–1855, Museum of the City of New York).

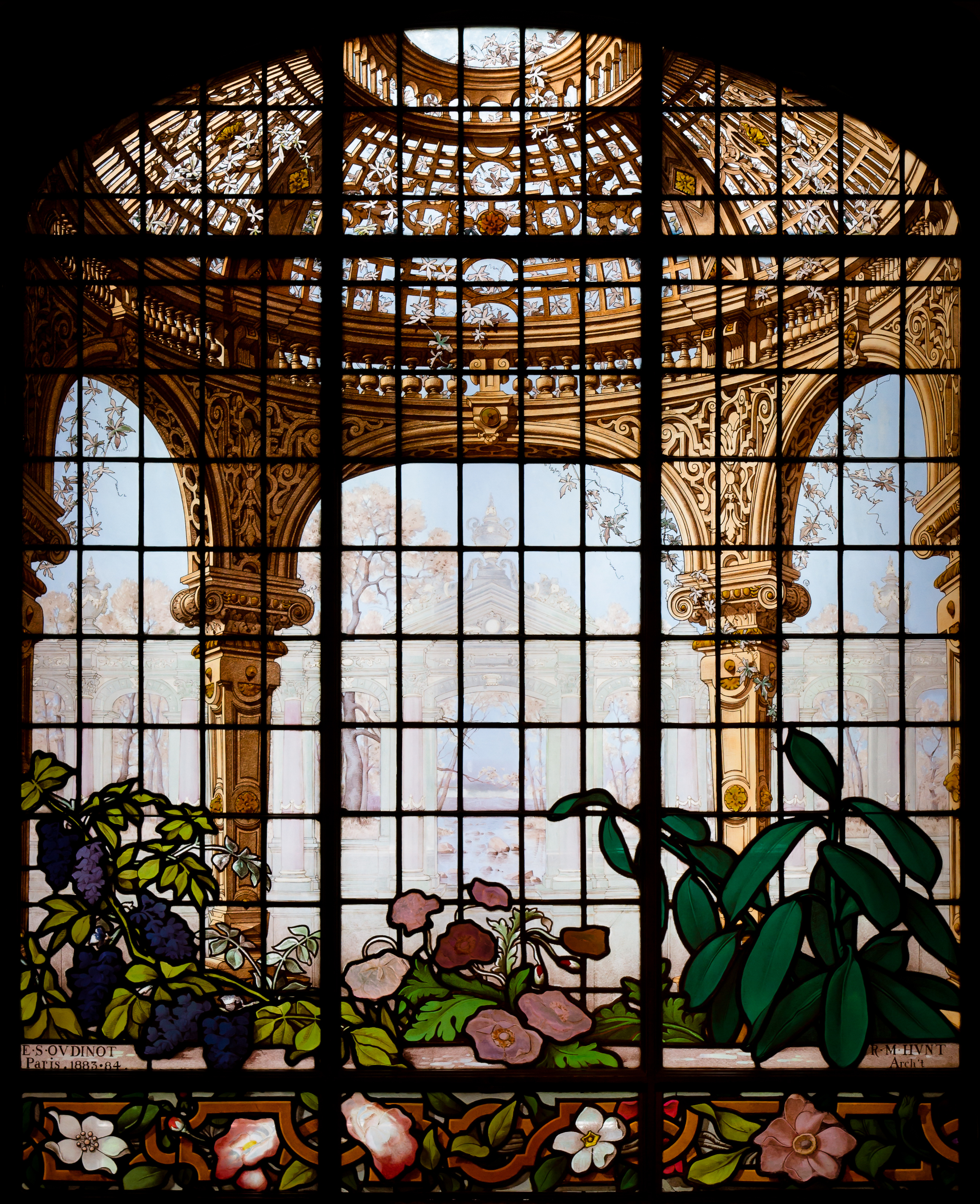
Henry Gurdon Marquand House Conservatory Window (around 1883–1884), designed by Richard Morris Hunt (1827–1895) and made by Eugène Stanislas Oudinot (1827–1889)

== Notable exhibitions ==
From October 2004 through July 2009, Perform was the only permanent exhibition in New York City focused on theater in New York. It included objects ranging from Bill "Bojangles" Robinson's tap shoes to advertising materials from Avenue Q.

Until September 15, 2019, the exhibition "In the Dugout with Jackie Robinson: An Intimate Portrait of a Baseball Legend" was on display. In honor of the centennial of Robinson's birth, the exhibition featured memorabilia, rare footage, and published magazines of the Robinson family.

In February 2020, the exhibit "City/Game: Basketball in New York" opened. The exhibit explored the history of basketball in New York City, including players like Kareem Abdul-Jabbar and Bob Douglass.

NYC Gingerbread: The Great Borough Bake-Off, 2026

Beginning in 2022, the museum hosts an annual exhibit called "NYC Gingerbread: The Great Borough Bake-Off." Any baker can submit a proposal to create a gingerbread version of an NYC scene, symbol, or landmark, attracting home bakers and professionals. Gingerbread scenes have included the Little Red Lighthouse, the Waldorf Astoria, breakdancing in The Bronx, and the Coney Island Cyclone. Visitors to the museum can vote for a fan favorite. The name of the exhibit is derived from the TV show The Great British Bake Off.

In 2026, the museum hosted a handmade model of New York City made by truck driver Joe Macken, which had gone viral on TikTok.

== See also ==
- List of museums and cultural institutions in New York City
- List of New York City Designated Landmarks in Manhattan from 59th to 110th Streets
