= Mohawk Valley Grange Hall =

- U.S. National Register of Historic Places
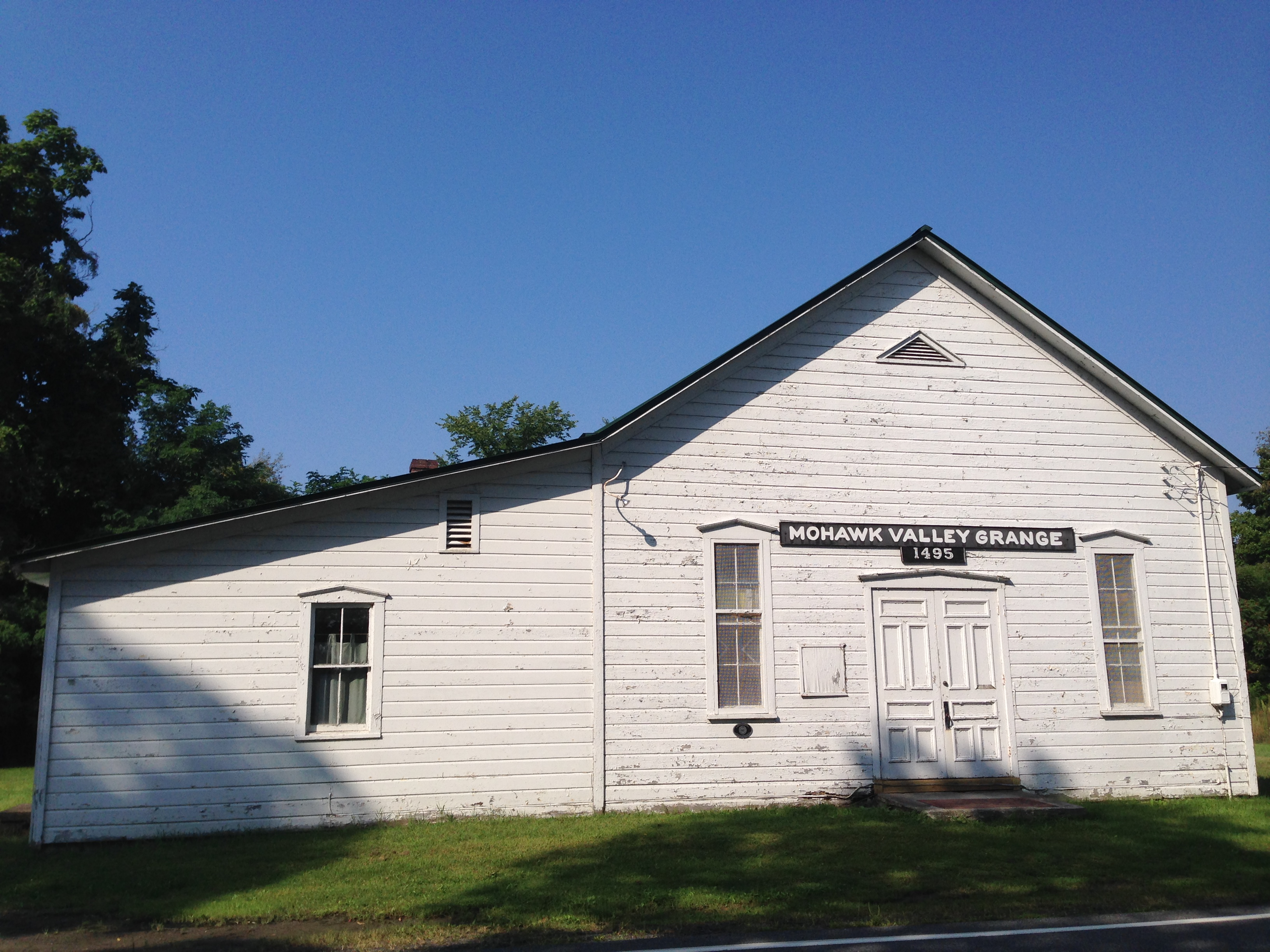
- Mohawk Valley Grange Hall, September 2014

- Location within New York Location within the United States
- Location: 274 Sugar Hill Rd., near Grooms Corners, New York
- Coordinates: 42°50′00″N 73°50′37″W
- Area: 0.26 acres (0.11 ha)
- Built: 1896, 1934
- Built by: Jump, Charles
- Architectural style: Late Victorian
- NRHP reference No.: 12000245
- Added to NRHP: April 3, 2012

Mohawk Valley Grange Hall, also known as Union Hall and Moser Hall, is a historic Grange hall located near Grooms Corners, Saratoga County, New York. It was built in 1896, and is a 1 1/2-story, three bay by four bay, timber frame building. It sits on a dry lad stone foundation and has a steep gable roof. A one-story, shed roofed addition was built in 1934. The Grange purchased the building in 1931, and deeded the building to the Town of Clifton Park in 2004.

It was listed on the National Register of Historic Places in 2012.
