= Clifton Gardens, New York =

- Census-designated place
- Location within New York Location within the United States
- Coordinates: 42°50′44″N 73°46′52″W
- Country: United States
- State: New York
- County: Saratoga
- Town: Clifton Park

Area
  - Total: 1.11 sq mi (2.88 km^{2})
  - Land: 1.10 sq mi (2.85 km^{2})
  - Water: 0.0077 sq mi (0.02 km^{2})
- Elevation: 312 ft (95 m)

Population (2020)
  - Total: 2,729
  - Density: 2,476.0/sq mi (955.98/km^{2})
- Time zone: UTC-5 (Eastern (EST))
  - Summer (DST): UTC-4 (EDT)
- ZIP Code: 12065 (Clifton Park)
- Area codes: 518/838
- FIPS code: 36-16298
- GNIS feature ID: 2812770

Clifton Gardens is a neighborhood and census-designated place (CDP) within the town of Clifton Park, Saratoga County, New York, United States. It was first listed as a CDP prior to the 2020 census. As of the 2020 census, Clifton Gardens had a population of 2,729.

The community is in southern Saratoga County, in the eastern part of Clifton Park. It is bordered to the north by Clifton Park Center Road and Sitterly Road, to the east by Interstate 87, to the south by Grooms Road, and to the west by Moe Road. The CDP of Clifton Knolls-Mill Creek borders Clifton Gardens to the west across Moe Road.

Clifton Gardens is 16 miles (26 km) north of Albany, 11 miles (18 km) east of Schenectady, and 18 miles (29 km) south of Saratoga Springs.

== Demographics ==
Historical population
Census	Pop.	Note	%±
2020	2,729		—
U.S. Decennial Census

=== 2020 census ===
As of the 2020 census, Clifton Gardens had a population of 2,729. The median age was 41.2 years. 18.8% of residents were under the age of 18 and 17.1% of residents were 65 years of age or older. For every 100 females there were 94.8 males, and for every 100 females age 18 and over there were 98.9 males age 18 and over.

100.0% of residents lived in urban areas, while 0.0% lived in rural areas.

There were 1,172 households in Clifton Gardens, of which 28.2% had children under the age of 18 living in them. Of all households, 53.2% were married-couple households, 18.9% were households with a male householder and no spouse or partner present, and 21.6% were households with a female householder and no spouse or partner present. About 27.5% of all households were made up of individuals and 10.1% had someone living alone who was 65 years of age or older.

There were 1,198 housing units, of which 2.2% were vacant. The homeowner vacancy rate was 0.0% and the rental vacancy rate was 3.5%.

Racial composition as of the 2020 census
Race	Number	Percent
White	2,181	79.9%
Black or African American	91	3.3%
American Indian and Alaska Native	6	0.2%
Asian	249	9.1%
Native Hawaiian and Other Pacific Islander	3	0.1%
Some other race	41	1.5%
Two or more races	158	5.8%
Hispanic or Latino (of any race)	105	3.8%
