= Shenendehowa Central School District =

School district in the U.S. state of New York

- Shenendehowa Central School District Logo

Address
- 970 Route 146 Clifton Park, New York, 12065; United States
- Coordinates: 42.8621657°N 73.8004886°W

District information
- Type: Public
- Grades: K-12
- Established: January 14, 1950; 76 years ago
- Superintendent: Cecily Wilson-Turner, PhD
- Budget: $206,611,477 (USD)

Students and staff
- Enrollment: 9,534
- District mascot: Stallion
- Colors: Green and White

Other information
- Website: www.shenschools.org

The Shenendehowa Central School District, often shortened to Shen, is a public school district located in New York's Capital District. The district's 232-acre (0.94 km^{2}) main campus is located off NY 146 in Clifton Park, and is home to nine of the district's 14 schools, in five buildings. There is a building housing all of kindergarten as well. The remaining four schools are called "neighborhood elementary schools" and are located throughout the district in three buildings. The district serves approximately 9,500 students in grades K-12 from throughout its 86-square-mile (220 km^{2}) territory which includes the towns of Clifton Park, Halfmoon, Ballston Lake, Round Lake, Malta and parts of Waterford, Rexford, Mechanicville and Stillwater. However, Malta and Stillwater are only zoned in Shenendehowa if the street has a zip code of a town that is in Shenendehowa. Shenendehowa is the largest School District in Saratoga County, and the largest in student population in the Suburban Council, an interscholastic athletic consortium of 11 area school with a districts.

The name Shenendehowa is derived from the Iroquois word “Shenondahowe," translating to "great plains."

== Schools ==
Today, Shenendehowa is a district of 14 schools: 1 building housing all of kindergarten, 8 elementary schools, 3 middle schools, and 2 high schools.

=== Elementary schools ===
Four elementary schools are located on the main campus (Skano, Tesago, Orenda, and Karigon). The other four are neighborhood elementary schools. They are named Okte, located on CR-92 Crescent Road off Exit 8 of the Adirondack Northway (I-87); Chango, located off CR-80 Round Lake Road at Exit 11 of the Adirondack Northway (I-87); and Arongen and Shatekon, located at 489 Clifton Park Center Rd. and 35 Maxwell Dr., respectively, just off the main campus. These schools are for students in grades 1-5. There is also another off-campus building that houses all of kindergarten. It is called Atrea Early Learning Center. It is located at 5 Maxwell Dr.

==== Principals ====
- Andrew Hills - Arongen
- Michelle Discenza - Chango
- Malik Jones - Karigon
- Kathleen Strangis - Okte
- Todd Giagni - Orenda
- Amy Irwin - Shatekon
- Jill Florio - Skano
- Gregory Pace - Tesago
- Erica Ryan - Atrea

=== Middle schools ===
The district's three middle school buildings share one large complex on the main campus. The schools share areas such as gyms and libraries, but function as separate schools. The Gowana/Acadia section of the middle school complex is the oldest building on campus, but has undergone extensive renovations and reconfigurations over the 63 years since it was built. The building now is home to Acadia, Koda, and Gowana Middle Schools, which together house all students in grades 6 through 8, divided by geographical region. Koda, previously located in what is now High School West, was added as an addition to the middle school complex and opened in 1999.

==== Principals ====
- Philip Weinman - Acadia
- Robin Gawrys - Gowana
- Rose Beckett - Koda

=== Shenendehowa High School ===
Shenendehowa High School is divided into two buildings, designated East and West by their respective geographical locations on the district's main campus. The West Building houses Grade 9, while the East Building houses Grades 10-12. Since the opening of the new wing of the East building in September 2004, that building has housed all of the district's sophomores, juniors, and seniors, while the West building has housed only the district's freshmen. The current principal is Ron Agostinoni.

== District governance ==
=== Board of education ===
At the district level, Shenendehowa is governed by a Board of Education made up of seven unsalaried citizens who serve three-year terms, and who are elected on a rotating basis. The current members of the board of education are:

- Naomi Hoffman - President
- Jason Digianni - Vice President
- Petra Holden
- Gusta Miller
- Stacey Pfolmm
- Deanna Stephenson
- Thomas Templeton

=== Superintendent ===
The board of education also employs a district superintendent who oversees the day-to-day operation of the district and who is responsible for the administration of board policies. The current superintendent is Dr Cecily Wilson-Turner, who received her bachelor's degree from Princeton University and her master's degree from New York University. She was previously the assistant superintendent of City school district of Albany.

Past superintendents include:

- Dr. L. Oliver Robinson (2005-2025)
- John O'Rourke (interim superintendent 2005)
- Dr. Robert McClure (1998-2005)
- Dr. Richard O'Rourke (interim superintendent 1997-1998)
- John Yagielski (1992-1997)
- Edward McHale (1985-1992)
- Dr. Edwin Dunmire (1968-1985)
- Richard Zeller (1968)
- Charles Frier (1961-1968)
- Rodney Winans (1950-1961)

== District statistics ==
In the 2005-06 school year, 4463 students were enrolled in grades K-5, 2269 were enrolled in grades 6-8, and 2858 were enrolled in grades 9-12. The district employed 676 teachers, 12 principals, 10 assistant principals, 85 professional staff, and 36 paraprofessionals during the same school year.

In the 2012-13 school year, a total of 8,745 students were enrolled in the district at the end of the year. The district employed 662 teachers, 12 principals, 11 assistant principals, and 85 professional staff.

== History ==
Shenendehowa Central School district was established on January 14, 1950, under the name of "Central Schools District No. 2, of the Towns of Clifton Park, Halfmoon, Malta, Waterford, Ballston and Stillwater, County of Saratoga, New York." The name Shenendehowa was decided later and accredited to old Dutch maps which designated the area as such. The school board says the word "Shenendahowe" comes from an Iroquois word meaning "Great Plains". All of the schools, with the exception of the high schools, have names derived from the Iroquois language.

After construction, kindergarten students and students of grades 8 through 12 were allowed to move into the main building (now Gowana and Acadia) in 1953. The following year, students of grades 1 through 7 would enter the same building. Grades K-6 moved to Tesago and Skano in 1966, while grades 9-12 moved to Shenendehowa High School after it was built in 1970. Shenendehowa Central School District continued to expand with Orenda and Karigon (1968); Okte (1973); Chango (1974); Koda Middle School (1976) (now High School West); Arongen (1992); High School West (1999, East 2004); Shatekon (2007), and Atrea (2026).

=== Alma mater ===
Shenendehowa's alma mater, written in 1962, is as follows:

Shenendehowa Central out on the plain so clear; Her Carillon bells are standing a symbol we hold dear; And through the years she'll guide us and help us on our way; We never will forget her but with honor will repay; Alma Mater, Alma Mater; to thee we sing our praise; Shenendehowa Central; Our standard our guide always

== Athletic teams ==
Shenendehowa's athletic teams have used the Shen script logo since 2024. Prior to 2024 they used the Plainsmen moniker, and their mascot was a stallion. This was changed to comply with State Education Department (SED) guidelines, which prohibited the use of Indigenous names, mascots, and logos by public schools. This guideline was adopted in 2023, and schools had until June 2025 to phase out the logos. Prior to 1995, the district used two different caricatures of a Native American as a mascot; they were phased out due to concerns that it depicted Native Americans in a demeaning and prejudicial fashion.

Shen participates in 34 varsity sports over all seasons, as well as competing at junior varsity, freshman, and modified levels in many of these sports. Fall varsity sports include boys' cross country, American football, golf, soccer, and volleyball, as well as girls' cross country running, field hockey, soccer, swimming and diving, tennis, volleyball, color guard, and cheerleading. In the winter season, Shen compete in boys' and girls' alpine and cross-country skiing, basketball, bowling club, winter guard, and indoor track, as well as boys' wrestling, swimming and diving, and ice hockey, and girls' gymnastics and cheerleading. The spring season includes boys' and girls' track and field and lacrosse, as well as baseball and tennis for boys, and softball for girls.

Although not officially associated with Shenendehowa athletics, Friends of Shenendehowa Crew, Inc. sponsors crew teams at the modified, freshmen, and varsity levels which are open to Shenendehowa students.

== See also ==
- Shenendehowa High School
- List of school districts in New York
