= Grooms Tavern Complex =

Historic commercial building in New York, United States

- U.S. National Register of Historic Places
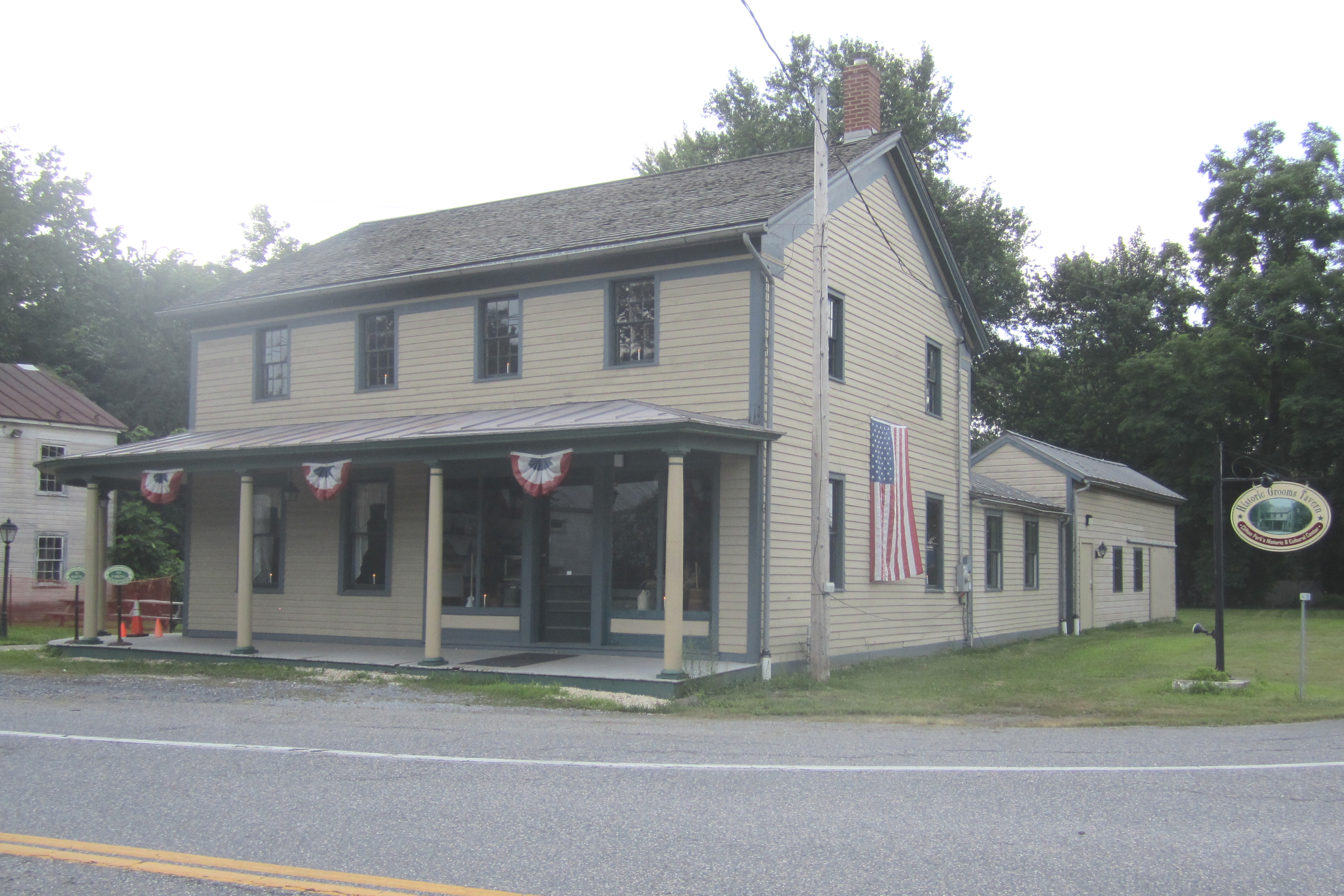
- Grooms Tavern, July 2013

- Location within New York Location within the United States
- Location: Sugar Hill Rd. at Grooms Rd., Grooms Corners, New York
- Coordinates: 42°50′5″N 73°50′41″W
- Area: 1.5 acres (0.61 ha)
- Built: ca. 1825
- Architectural style: Greek Revival, Federal
- NRHP reference No.: 00000094
- Added to NRHP: February 10, 2000

Grooms Tavern Complex is a historic tavern located at Grooms Corners in Saratoga County, New York. The complex consists of the tavern, a wagon and blacksmith shop, and a frame privy. The tavern building was built about 1825 and is a 2-story, timber-framed, gable-roofed building in a vernacular Federal style. It consists of a main block with 1 1/2-story, frame kitchen wing in the rear. When expanded to two stories in the 1840s, a Greek Revival style cornice was added. The building was partially remodeled in the late 19th and early 20th centuries. The tavern building was also operated as a general store. The wagon and blacksmith shop was constructed in the 1840s and is a 2-story, rectangular, timber-framed building with a gable roof in the Greek Revival style.

It was listed on the National Register of Historic Places in 2000.
