= Smith's Grain and Feed Store =

Historic commercial building in New York, United States

- U.S. National Register of Historic Places
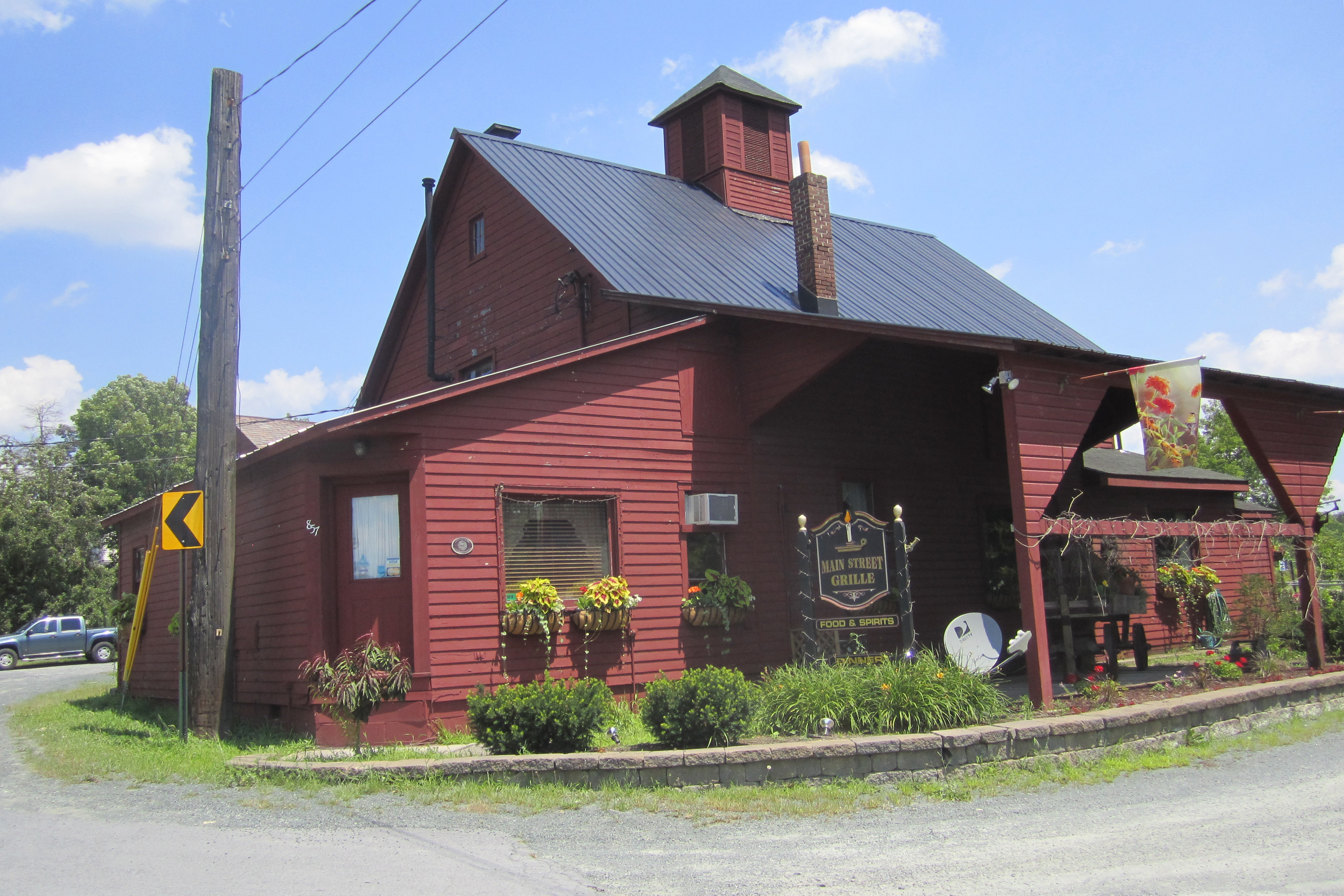
- Smith's Grain and Feed Store, July 2013

- Location within New York Location within the United States
- Location: 857 Main St., Elnora, New York
- Coordinates: 42°53′35″N 73°49′16″W
- Area: 1.69 acres (0.68 ha)
- Built: 1892
- Architectural style: Late Victorian
- NRHP reference No.: 12000260
- Added to NRHP: May 8, 2012

Smith's Grain and Feed Store is a historic feed store located at Elnora, Saratoga County, New York. It was built in 1892, and is a 2 1/2-story, gable roofed frame building with three additions. It is sheathed in clapboard and has a standing seam metal roof topped by an air vent cupola. Also on the property is a contributing railroad building; a 1 1/2-story, rectangular frame building dated to the early-20th century.

It was listed on the National Register of Historic Places in 2012.
