= Clifton Park, New York =

Clifton Park Shenendehowa (Mohawk)
- Town
- Town of Clifton Park
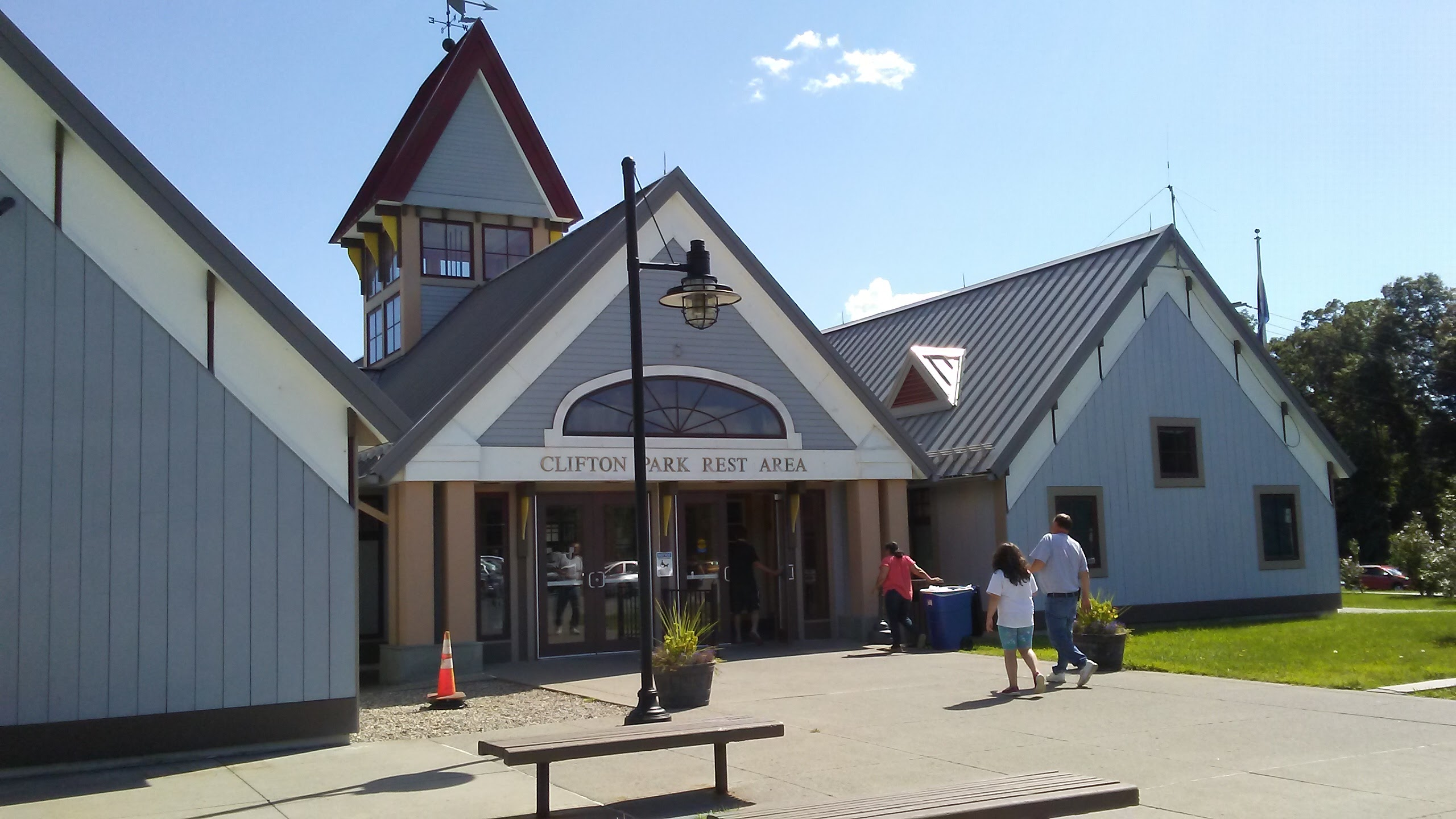
- The town's rest area on I-87
- Nickname: The Greatest City in All of Saratoga County
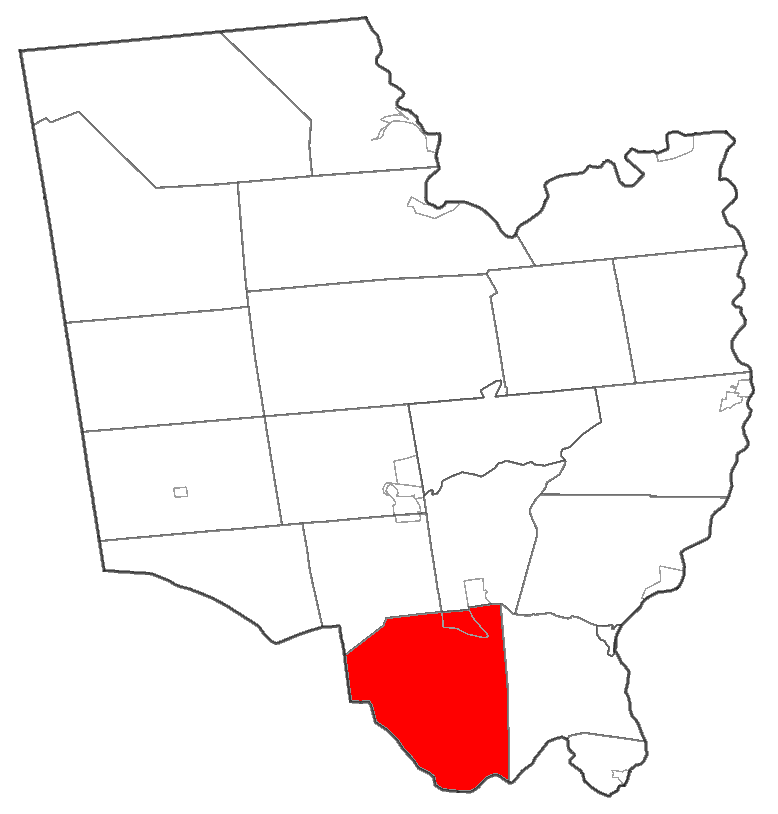
- Location within Saratoga County

- Location within the state of New York Clifton Park (the United States)
- Coordinates: 42°52′N 73°49′W
- Country: United States
- State: New York
- County: Saratoga

Government
  - Mayor: John Keegan

Area
  - Total: 50.20 sq mi (130.03 km^{2})
  - Land: 48.20 sq mi (124.84 km^{2})
  - Water: 2.00 sq mi (5.19 km^{2})
- Elevation: 318 ft (97 m)

Population (2020)
  - Total: 38,029
  - Density: 762.5/sq mi (294.41/km^{2})
- Time zone: UTC-5 (Eastern (EST))
  - Summer (DST): UTC-4 (EDT)
- ZIP code: 12065
- Area code: 518
- FIPS code: 36-16353
- GNIS feature ID: 0978839
- Website: cliftonparkny.gov

Clifton Park is a suburban town in Saratoga County, New York, United States. It is the largest municipality in the county, with a 2020 population of 38,029, according to the 2020 census. As such, it is the largest municipality in New York state east of Syracuse and north of Schenectady. The town's name is derived from an early land patent. The town is in the southern part of Saratoga County, approximately 12 miles (19 km) north of Albany, 7 miles (11 km) northeast of Schenectady, and 10 miles (16 km) south of Saratoga Springs.

== History ==
The Indigenous Mohawks and Mohicans referred to the area as Canastigione, meaning corn flats. The first settlements in what is now Clifton Park were established in the 17th century. The town or area was named in 1707 by Nanning Harmansen. At that time, Nanning Harmansen sent letters to Lord Cornbury requesting letters of Patent for Land he bought from the Indigenous Americans. He also stated in this correspondence that he wanted the patent to be known by "Your name of Cliftons Park", and the patent was named the Clifton Park Patent. The Iroqouis name for the Clifton Park Patent was Shenendehowa (meaning "Great Plains") which is where the school district gets its name.

The area along the Mohawk River was popular for ferries across the waterbed, with Eldert Vischer opening the crossing known as Vischer Ferry in 1783. To the northwest, Edward Rexford established Rexford Flats, a small community on the riverbank at the northern end of what became NY 146B.

In 1828, the town of Clifton Park was referred to as "Clifton" from the town of Halfmoon, but was renamed Clifton Park a year later. It was the last town created in Saratoga County. The town originally consisted of farmland with a small village of homes, churches and businesses on what is now U.S. Route 9, but saw a large demographic change when Interstate 87 was built through the town in 1961.

The Grooms Tavern Complex was listed on the National Register of Historic Places in 2000. The Mohawk Valley Grange Hall was added in 2012.

== Geography ==
According to the United States Census Bureau, the town has a total area of 50.2 square miles (130 km^{2}), of which 48.6 square miles (126 km^{2}) is land and 1.6 square miles (4.1 km^{2}) (3.29%) is water.

The town's southern boundary is defined by the Mohawk River and is the border between Saratoga County and Schenectady and Albany counties.

Interstate 87 (the "Adirondack Northway") and U.S. Route 9 pass through the eastern part of the town. New York State Route 146 is an east–west highway through most of the center of Clifton Park until it takes a 90 degree turn southward, passing east of the hamlet of Rexford and then crossing the Rexford bridge into the Town of Niskayuna in Schenectady County.

== Demographics ==
Historical population
Census	Pop.	Note	%±
1830	2,494		—
1840	2,719		9.0%
1850	2,868		5.5%
1860	2,804		−2.2%
1870	2,657		−5.2%
1880	2,454		−7.6%
1890	2,228		−9.2%
1900	2,140		−3.9%
1910	2,225		4.0%
1920	1,983		−10.9%
1930	2,222		12.1%
1940	2,253		1.4%
1950	3,281		45.6%
1960	4,512		37.5%
1970	14,867		229.5%
1980	23,989		61.4%
1990	30,117		25.5%
2000	32,995		9.6%
2010	36,705		11.2%
2020	38,029		3.6%
U.S. Decennial Census

As of the census of 2008, there were over 37,707 people, 13,782 households, and 10,077 families residing in the town. There were 14,262 housing units. The racial makeup of the town was 92.2% White, 2.0% African American, 0.02% Native American, 3.4% Asian, 0.02% Pacific Islander, 0.36% from other races, and 1.6% from two or more races.

There were 13,782 households, out of which 35.7% had children under the age of 18 living with them, 63.8% were married couples living together, 6.2% had a female householder with no husband present, and 26.9% were non-families. 21.8% of all households were made up of individuals, and 6.8% had someone living alone who was 65 years of age or older. The average household size was 2.73 and the average family size was 3.23.

In the town, the age distribution of the population shows 27% under the age of 20, 5.5% from 20 to 24, 15.9% from 25 to 44, 26.1% from 45 to 64, and 12.3% who were 65 years of age or older. The median age was 38.2 years. For 18 and older, there were 49.2% males and 50.8% females.

The median income for a household in the town was $82,850, and the median income for a family was $98,275. Males had a median income of $68,417 versus $46,948 for females. The per capita income for the town was $37,405. About 1.4% of families and 2.9% of the population were below the poverty line, including 2.9% of those under age 18 and 2.8% of those age 65 or over.

== Recreation ==
There are many opportunities for youth involvement in typical sports teams such as football, baseball, softball, lacrosse, soccer, basketball, wrestling and hockey. Adults may participate as well. Every year Clifton Park Soccer Club hosts an international tournament called the Rose and Kiernan/Clifton Park Soccer International Soccer Classic.

Clifton Park also periodically hosts the Babe Ruth World Series for boys baseball. There are also other annual events, such as Winterfest.

Clifton Common which is located on Vischer Ferry Rd. is a central hub for recreation which features baseball/softball fields, soccer fields, outdoor basketball courts, two NHL-size ice rinks, playgrounds, and an outdoor stage for performing arts.

The Vischer Ferry Nature and Historic Preserve, a 740-acre site in southern Clifton Park adjacent to the Mohawk River, features a network of walking trails alongside an original section of the Erie Canal and towpath.

== Schools ==
The public school district covering most (the eastern two-thirds) of Clifton Park is the Shenendehowa Central School District, located on NY Route 146. In addition, the Burnt Hills-Ballston Lake Central School District and the Niskayuna Central School District cover the northwest and southwest corners of Clifton Park respectively.

The main campus of Shenendehowa Central Schools covers about 232 acres (0.94 km^{2}) of property along the south side of NY Route 146. With a student body of over 9,800 students in eight elementary schools, three middle schools, and two high schools, Shenendehowa Central Schools is one of the largest school districts in New York State. Shenendehowa Central Schools' achievements include twenty-two New York State Championship titles for their Men's Soccer team as well as two National Championships. Their Cross Country team has won six NYS Federation Men's Cross Country Championships.

Shenendehowa schools:

Elementary schools: Skano/Tesago (connected), Karigon/Orenda (connected), Okte, Chango, Arongen/Shatekon (connected), and Atrea Early Learning Center (housing all of kindergarten)

Middle schools (all connected): Gowana, Acadia, Koda

High schools: High School West (9th grade only) and High School East (10-12 grades only)

Although there are two different high schools, they are allowed to participate in the same clubs and events (with few exceptions, such as dances and activities during school hours.)

== Communities and locations in Clifton Park ==
- Ballston Lake – A town in the northwestern part of Clifton Park, located at the south end of a lake named Ballston Lake.
- Clifton Gardens – A neighborhood and census-designated place in the eastern part of the town.
- Clifton Knolls-Mill Creek – A neighborhood and census-designated place southeast of the center of town.
- Clifton Park Center – A hamlet in the vicinity of town hall. The Clifton Park Center Baptist Church and Cemetery was listed on the National Register of Historic Places in 2004.
- Colonie Reservoir – A reservoir in the southern section of the town.
- Country Knolls – A hamlet and census-designated place on the town's northern border, near Round Lake.
- Elnora – A hamlet north of Clifton Park Center hamlet on NY 146A. The Smith's Grain and Feed Store was listed on the National Register of Historic Places in 2012.
- Flagler Corners – A hamlet east of Clifton Park Center.
- Grooms Corners – A hamlet in the southwestern part of the town on County Road 91. The Grooms Tavern Complex and Mohawk Valley Grange Hall are listed on the National Register of Historic Places.
- Jonesville – A hamlet north of Elnora on County Road 82.
- Rexford – A hamlet near the western town line and the Mohawk River.
- Round Lake – A lake, the southern part of which is in the northeastern corner of the town.
- Ushers – A location south of Round Lake on the Clifton Park-Halfmoon border.
- Vischer Ferry – A hamlet on County Road 92, located near the Mohawk River in the southern section of Clifton Park.

== Notable people ==
- Emma Lee Benedict (1857-1937), editor, educator, author
- Lawrence P. Flynn (1931–2017), Adjutant General of New York, lived in Clifton Park
- Kevin Huerter, NBA Player
- Joe Macken, miniature model maker
- Patrick A. Murphy, Adjutant General of New York
- Keith Raniere, cult leader
- Reid Scott, actor
- Ian Anderson, MLB pitcher.

== See also ==
- Shenendehowa United Methodist Church
