= Mohawk Towpath Scenic Byway =

Mohawk Towpath Scenic Byway

Route information
- Maintained by NYSDOT
- Length: 26.2 mi (42.2 km)

Major junctions
- West end: NY 5 in Schenectady
- East end: US 4 / NY 32 in Waterford

Location
- Country: United States
- State: New York

Highway system
- Scenic Byways; National; National Forest; BLM; NPS; New York Highways; Interstate; US; State; Reference; Parkways

The Mohawk Towpath Scenic Byway is a National Scenic Byway in the Capital District region of New York in the United States. It extends from Schenectady to Waterford by way of a series of local, county, and state highways along the Mohawk River and the Erie Canal. The byway is intended to showcase the history of the waterway, from Native American times through the creation of the Erie Canal and the role the waterside communities played in the Industrial Revolution and the westward expansion of the United States. At its east end, the byway connects to the Lakes to Locks Passage, an All-American Road.

== Route description ==
The Mohawk Towpath Scenic Byway extends for 26.2 miles (42.2 km) from downtown Schenectady to the village of Waterford by way of a series of highways running alongside the Mohawk River. It begins at the intersection of Erie Boulevard and State Street (New York State Route 5 or NY 5) in Schenectady and follows Erie Boulevard and Maxon Road out of the city. Now in the town of Niskayuna, the byway runs alongside the Mohawk River as it follows County Route 10 (CR 10) northeast to a junction with NY 146 in the hamlet of Aqueduct. CR 10 ends here; however, the Mohawk Towpath Scenic Byway turns north to cross the Mohawk River and enter Saratoga County by way of NY 146.

On the opposite riverbank, the byway leaves the state route at a junction with CR 88 and CR 91 in the town of Clifton Park. It follows the latter road to the southeast, taking on the name Riverview Road as it runs adjacent to the Mohawk River. This section of the Mohawk Towpath Scenic Byway was once part of NY 146B, a now-defunct spur route of NY 146. CR 91 leaves Riverview Road at Grooms Road; however, the byway continues southeastward along the now town-maintained road. Riverview Road continues to parallel the Mohawk River into the town of Halfmoon, where Riverview Road ends at an intersection with Clam Steam Road just east of Interstate 87. The byway briefly heads south from here on Clam Steam Road before turning back to the northeast on Canal Road.

Canal Road ultimately brings the scenic byway to the hamlet of Crescent, where it intersects U.S. Route 9 (US 9). At this point, the byway splits into two branches, with each branch following a specific side of the Mohawk River. The main byway follows the south branch, which heads south from Crescent along US 9 and immediately crosses the Mohawk River on the Crescent Bridge to reach Albany County. On the south side of the riverbank in the town of Colonie, the byway splits from US 9 and proceeds southeast along Cohoes Crescent Road, a local road running alongside the waterway. It soon crosses into the city of Cohoes, becoming North Mohawk Street in the process. The byway continues along North Mohawk and New Cortland streets to Saratoga Street (NY 32), where it turns north to follow NY 32 back into Saratoga County and the village of Waterford.

The north branch of the byway heads east from Crescent, loosely following the riverbank as it proceeds along CR 99 to the hamlet of Halfmoon. CR 99 ends here, giving way to CR 94; however, CR 94 terminates just a quarter-mile (0.4 km) to the east at an intersection with CR 96. This road brings the byway into the town of Waterford, but it is CR 97 that carries the byway into the village of Waterford. The latter portion serves Lock Six State Canal Park and runs in close proximity to the Erie Canal, here separate from the Mohawk River. Within the village, the byway follows Washington Avenue and Sixth Street to reach NY 32 and the byway's south branch at Broad Street. The unified byway follows NY 32 east from Sixth Street to its junction with US 4 at Third Street. The intersection is the east end of the Mohawk Towpath Scenic Byway and the south end of the Lakes to Locks Passage, an All-American Road connecting Waterford to Rouses Point by way of the Hudson River and Lake Champlain corridors.

== History ==
The Mohawk Towpath Scenic Byway was created as the result of a grassroots effort to showcase to the Capital District's portion of the Mohawk River corridor. The byway was designated a New York State Scenic Byway in July 2003, and named a National Scenic Byway in September 2005. The word "Mohawk" in the byway's name is derived from the Mohawk River, and by extension the Mohawk people who originally inhabited the area. The word "Towpath" comes from a period of the Erie Canal's history when canal vessels moved principally by draft animals—mostly mules—that pulled craft from the path atop the side berm of the canal.

== Major intersections ==
County	Location	mi	km	Destinations	Notes
Schenectady	Schenectady	0.0	0.0	NY 5 (Erie Boulevard) to I-890	
Schenectady	Niskayuna	4.6	7.4	NY 146 south	Southern terminus of NY 146 / Mohawk Towpath Byway overlap, Northern Terminus of CR 10/ Mohawk Towpath Byway overlap
Saratoga	Clifton Park	4.9	7.9	NY 146 north / CR 88 west (Riverview Road)	Northern terminus of NY 146 / Mohawk Towpath Byway overlap, Western terminus of CR 91/ Mohawk Towpath Byway overlap
Saratoga	Clifton Park	5.7	9.2	CR 91 east (Grooms Road)	Eastern terminus of CR 91/ Mohawk Towpath Byway overlap
Saratoga	Clifton Park	12.5	20.1	CR 92 east (Vischer Ferry Road) to I-87	
Saratoga	Halfmoon	16.7	26.9	Crescent–Vischer Ferry Road (NY 911P west) to I-87	Western terminus of NYRef 911P / Mohawk Towpath Byway overlap
Saratoga	Halfmoon	17.0	27.4	US 9 north	Eastern terminus of NYRef 911P / Mohawk Towpath Byway overlap, Northern terminus of US 9 / Mohawk Towpath Byway overlap
Albany	Town of Colonie	17.6	28.3	US 9 south	Southern terminus of US 9 / Mohawk Towpath Byway overlap, Northern terminus of CR 159/ Mohawk Towpath Byway overlap
Albany	Cohoes	19.7	31.7	NY 32 south / NY 787 to I-787	Southern terminus of CR 159/ Mohawk Towpath Byway overlap, Southern terminus of NY 32 / Mohawk Towpath Byway overlap
Saratoga	Village of Waterford	21.4	34.4	US 4 / NY 32 north	Northern terminus of NY 32 / Mohawk Towpath Byway overlap
1.000 mi = 1.609 km; 1.000 km = 0.621 mi

North branch

The entire route is in Saratoga County.

Location	mi	km	Destinations	Notes
Halfmoon	0.0	0.0	US 9	
Village of Waterford	4.8	7.7	NY 32	
1.000 mi = 1.609 km; 1.000 km = 0.621 mi
