= List of county routes in Saratoga County, New York =

County routes in Saratoga County, New York, are signed with the Manual on Uniform Traffic Control Devices-standard yellow-on-blue pentagon route marker. The highest numbered route in the county, County Route 1345 (CR 1345), is the only signed four-digit route of any type in the state.

== Routes 1–50 ==
Route	Length (mi)	Length (km)	From	Via	To	Notes
CR 1	6.39	10.28	CR 4	Hadley–Stony Creek Road in Hadley	Warren County line (becomes CR 12)	
CR 2	9.62	15.48	CR 4 in Day	Hadley Hill Road	CR 1 in Hadley	Proposed but not implemented
CR 2	0.19	0.31	NY 32	Peters Road in Northumberland	Landfill entrance	
CR 3	0.54	0.87	CR 4	Stewart Bridge Road in Hadley	Dead end	Ownership transferred to town
CR 4	22.70	36.53	Fulton County line in Edinburg (becomes CR 113)	North Shore Road	Warren County line in Hadley (becomes CR 44)	
CR 5	3.47	5.58	Fulton County line	Sinclair Point Road in Edinburg	CR 4 / CR 98	
CR 6	0.8	1.29	CR 4	South Shore Road in Hadley	CR 7	Entire length incorporated into CR 7
CR 7	21.72	34.95	Fulton County line in Providence (becomes CR 110)	South Shore Road	CR 4 in Hadley	Section from Fulton County line to CR 98 originally part of CR 13
CR 8	1.55	2.49	CR 7	Conklingville–Lynwood Road in Hadley	CR 4	
CR 9	0.14	0.23	NY 9N	River Street and East River Drive in Corinth village	Warren County line (becomes CR 16)	
CR 10	8.74	14.07	CR 7 in Day	West Mountain and Mosher roads	NY 9N in Corinth	Originally routed on West Mountain Road and Hamilton Avenue into Corinth
CR 11	1.43	2.30	CR 10 / West Mountain Road	Mosher Road in Corinth	NY 9N	Proposed but CR 10 was rerouted onto this segment instead
CR 12	4.76	7.66	CR 21	Lake Desolation Road in Greenfield	Becomes town road at Lake Desolation	Originally proposed to extend to CR 7 in Edinburg
CR 13	7.44	11.97	CR 16	Barkersville–Fayville Road in Providence	CR 7	Originally extended to CR 98 in Edinburg, including 0.13 miles (0.21 km) spur to Fulton County line
CR 14	8.61	13.86	Fulton County line in Galway (intersects CR 107)	Crooked Street and Fish House Road	Fulton County line in Providence (becomes CR 109)	3.59 miles (5.78 km) section south of NY 29 originally CR 44
CR 16	4.05	6.52	NY 29 in Galway	Barkersville Road	Bills Road in Providence	
CR 17	1.79	2.88	CR 19 / CR 18	North Greenfield Road in Greenfield	NY 9N / CR 25	Entire length incorporated into CR 19
CR 18	1.82	2.93	CR 17 / CR 19	Porters Corners Road in Greenfield	NY 9N	Ownership transferred to town
CR 19	6.57	10.57	CR 21	North Creek Road in Greenfield	NY 9N / CR 25	1.79 miles (2.88 km) section northeast of Porters Corners originally CR 17
CR 20	2.49	4.01	NY 29 in Galway	Middle Grove Road	CR 21 / Boyhaven Road in Greenfield	Entire length incorporated into CR 21
CR 21	7.86	12.65	NY 29 in Galway	Middle Grove Road	NY 9N in Greenfield	2.49 miles (4.01 km) section west of Boyhaven Road originally CR 20
CR 22	3.53	5.68	US 9	Crescent Avenue in Saratoga Springs	NY 9P	
CR 23	1.02	1.64	NY 29	Brook Road in Saratoga Springs	NY 9N	
CR 24	10.00	16.09	Corinth village line in Corinth	Palmer and Spier Falls avenues	US 9 / CR 31 in Moreau	
CR 25	6.61	10.64	NY 9N / CR 19 in Greenfield	Spier Falls–North Greenfield Road	CR 24 in Corinth	
CR 26			Van Buren Street in South Glens Falls	Ferry Boulevard	CR 27 in Moreau	Proposed but uncompleted, easternmost 0.85 miles (1.37 km) completed section owned by town
CR 27	3.72	5.99	US 9	Bluebird and Hudson Falls Roads in Moreau	Ferry Boulevard	Includes 0.55 miles (0.89 km) spur to Washington County line
CR 28	3.08	4.96	NY 197	South Glens Falls–Fort Edward Road in Moreau	South Glens Falls village line	
CR 29	9.89	15.92	NY 32 / CR 39 in Northumberland	West River Road	NY 197 in Moreau	
CR 31	3.18	5.12	CR 32	Fortsville Road in Moreau	US 9 / CR 24	
CR 32	5.19	8.35	CR 34 in Wilton	Wilton–Gansevoort Road	NY 32 in Northumberland	
CR 33	3.91	6.29	US 9 / CR 101	Ballard Road in Wilton	NY 50	
CR 34	4.51	7.26	US 9	Northern Pines Road in Wilton	CR 32	
CR 35	2.07	3.33	CR 36 / Gailor Road	Parkhurst Road in Wilton	CR 32	Ownership transferred to town, 0.07 miles (0.11 km) section east of US 9 abandoned
CR 36	5.15	8.29	NY 9N in Greenfield	Wilton–Greenfield and Parkhurst roads	US 9 in Wilton	
CR 39	4.84	7.79	NY 50 in Wilton	King Road	NY 32 / CR 29 in Northumberland	
CR 40	2.14	3.44	NY 29 in Saratoga	Creamery Road	NY 32 in Northumberland	
CR 41	0.10	0.16	Dead end	Old Ballston Avenue North in Saratoga Springs	CR 43	
CR 42	0.50	0.80	US 4 / NY 32 in Saratoga	Champlain Canal Lock 5 access road	Dead end in Northumberland	
CR 43 (1)	3.27	5.26	CR 49	Geyser Road in Milton	Wood Thrush Court	Original western terminus at Rock City Road (former routing of CR 49), 0.15 miles (0.24 km) east of CR 59
CR 43 (2)	2.00	3.22	Milton town line	Geyser Road in Saratoga Springs	NY 50	
CR 44	3.59	5.78	Fulton County line in Galway (intersects CR 107)	Crooked Street in Galway	NY 29	Entire length incorporated into CR 14
CR 44	0.41	0.66	CR 43	Cady Hill Boulevard in Saratoga Springs	CR 46	
CR 45	15.29	24.61	Fulton County line in Galway (intersects CR 107 and CR 132)	West Galway Road, West Street, East Street, Ballston Road, Galway Road, North Line Road, and Grays Crossing Road	CR 63 in Saratoga Springs	Section east of Rock City Road originally CR 106
CR 46	3.04	4.89	CR 52	Old Mill and Parkis Mills roads in Galway	NY 29	Proposed but not implemented
CR 46	0.55	0.89	Dead end	Duplainville Road in Saratoga Springs	CR 44	
CR 47	1.88	3.03	NY 67 in Charlton	Jockey Street	NY 29 in Galway	Entire length incorporated into CR 52
CR 47 (1)	1.88	3.03	Ballston Spa village line	Rowland Street in Milton	0.4 mi N of Margaret Drive	
CR 47 (2)	1.75	2.82	0.11 mi N of Deer Run Drive	Rowland Street in Milton	NY 29	
CR 48	1.88	3.03	CR 51 / CR 57 in Ballston	Goode Street	CR 45 in Milton	Section south of NY 67 incorporated into CR 57, ownership of remaining section transferred to town
CR 49	5.74	9.24	Ballston Spa village line	Maple Avenue and Rock City Road in Milton	NY 29	Ownership south of CR 43 transferred to town, CR 43 extended on section west to present routing of CR 49
CR 49	2.94	4.73	CR 45	West Milton and Rock City roads in Milton	NY 29	Section southwest of CR 43 to West Milton originally CR 105
CR 50	2.10	3.38	Ballston Spa village line	Greenfield Avenue in Milton	Saratoga County Airport	

== Routes 51 and up ==
Route	Length (mi)	Length (km)	From	Via	To	Notes
CR 51	8.38	13.49	NY 147 at the Schenectady County line in Charlton	Charlton Road	NY 50 in Ballston	
CR 52	12.39	19.94	Schenectady County line in Charlton (becomes CR 43)	Swaggertown Road and Jockey Street	NY 29 in Galway	Original northern terminus at NY 67 / CR 47 (former routing)
CR 53	2.94	4.73	CR 51	Stage Road and Lake Hill Road in Charlton	Schenectady County line (becomes CR 24)	
CR 54	1.13	1.82	Schenectady County line (becomes CR 37)	Stage Road in Charlton	CR 53	
CR 55	2.88	4.63	CR 51	Sweetman Road in Charlton	NY 67	
CR 56	5.87	9.45	Schenectady County line (becomes CR 33)	Scotch Bush and Hop City roads in Ballston	NY 67	
CR 57	6.06	9.75	CR 58	Goode Street in Ballston	NY 67	Original northern terminus at CR 51
CR 58	0.29	0.47	CR 57 at Schenectady County line (becomes CR 24)	Lake Hill Road in Ballston	NY 50 / CR 339	
CR 59	9.11	14.66	NY 50 in Ballston	Middle Line Road	NY 29 in Milton	
CR 60	1.51	2.43	CR 59	Brookline Road in Ballston	NY 67	
CR 61	2.25	3.62	CR 63	Rowley Road in Malta	CR 64	Includes 0.12 miles (0.19 km) spur to dead end at I-87
CR 63	4.31	6.94	Ballston Spa village line in Milton	Malta Avenue and Malta Avenue Extension	Riley Cove & Manning Roads in Malta	
CR 64	3.47	5.58	CR 63 in Malta	Nelson Avenue Extension	CR 22 in Saratoga Springs	
CR 65	2.37	3.81	NY 9P	Meadow Brook Road in Saratoga Springs	CR 67	
CR 66	0.88	1.42	NY 9P	Dyer Switch Road in Saratoga Springs	CR 65	
CR 67	6.08	9.78	NY 32 in Saratoga	Stafford Bridge Road	NY 29 in Saratoga Springs	
CR 68	3.85	6.20	CR 67	Staffords Bridge–Cramers Road in Saratoga	NY 32	
CR 69	2.42	3.89	NY 32	Coveville Road in Saratoga	US 4	
CR 70	4.73	7.61	NY 423 in Stillwater	Deans Corners–Wayville Road	CR 67 in Saratoga	2.84 miles (4.57 km) section south of CR 71 originally CR 72
CR 71	4.31	6.94	NY 9P	Cedars Bluff Road in Saratoga	NY 32	
CR 72	2.84	4.57	NY 423 in Stillwater		CR 70 / CR 71 in Saratoga	Entire length incorporated into CR 70
CR 72	0.29	0.47	CR 78	100 Acre Woods Way in Malta	CR 77	
CR 73	0.54	0.87	CR 78	Rocket Way in Malta	CR 77	
CR 75	5.64	9.08	Mechanicville city line	Viall Avenue and Meeting House Road in Stillwater	NY 423	
CR 76	6.03	9.70	NY 9P	Lake Road in Stillwater	Stillwater village line	
CR 77	1.90	3.06	US 9	Stonebreak Road and Stonebreak Road Extension in Malta	Wafer Way / CR 78	
CR 78 (1)	1.87	3.01	NY 67	Luther Forest Boulevard in Malta	Stillwater town line	
CR 78 (2)	0.48	0.77	Stillwater town line	Luther Forest Boulevard Ext. in Malta	CR 77 / Wafer Way	
CR 79	5.26	8.47	NY 146A in Clifton Park	Schauber and Lake roads	CR 82 in Ballston	Section on Schauber Road incorporated into CR 80, Lake Road section proposed but not implemented
CR 80 (1)	4.91	7.90	NY 146A in Clifton Park	Schauber and Round Lake roads	NY 915J at I-87 exit 11 in Malta	Original western terminus at former CR 79 and Lake Road in Ballston, Section in Malta originally CR 83
CR 80 (2)	0.68	1.09	Dead end at US 9	Maltaville Road	NY 67	Formerly CR 1183
CR 81	2.05	3.30	CR 79 (now CR 80)	Hubbs and Hatlee roads in Clifton Park	CR 82 / Mac Elroy Road	Proposed but not implemented
CR 82	4.94	7.95	NY 146A in Clifton Park	Main Street and Long Kill and East Line roads	NY 67 in Malta	
CR 83	4.94	7.95	CR 82	Round Lake and Curry roads and George Avenue in Malta	US 9	Former routing now CR 80 and NY 915J
CR 84	2.30	3.70	US 9 in Clifton Park	Ushers and Coon Crossing roads	NY 67 in Stillwater	Proposed but not implemented, including unbuilt 0.50 miles (0.80 km) cutoff in Halfmoon
CR 86	2.80	4.51	NY 146	Upper Newtown Road in Halfmoon	US 4 / NY 32	
CR 87	0.51	0.82	Schenectady County line	Glenridge Road in Clifton Park	NY 146 / CR 110	Entire length now NY 914V
CR 88	0.44	0.71	Schenectady County line (becomes CR 16)	Riverview Road in Clifton Park	NY 146 / CR 91	
CR 90	4.72	7.60	CR 92	Vischer Ferry Road in Clifton Park	NY 146 / NY 146A	
CR 91	8.35	13.44	NY 146 / CR 88 in Clifton Park	Riverview and Grooms roads	US 9 / CR 94 in Halfmoon	Part west of Sugarhill and Miller roads was formerly NY 146B
CR 92	3.59	5.78	Vischer Ferry Road (CR 90) in Clifton Park	Crescent-Vischer Ferry Road	NY 911P at I-87 exit 8 in Halfmoon	
CR 93	0.83	1.34	CR 94	Lape Road in Halfmoon	CR 95	Ownership transferred to town
CR 94	1.77	2.85	US 9 / CR 91	Guideboard Road in Halfmoon	CR 96	
CR 95	1.96	3.15	CR 94 / CR 99	Harris Road in Halfmoon	NY 236	Originally extended to NY 146 on present routing of NY 236
CR 96	3.44	5.54	Waterford village line in Waterford	Middletown Road	CR 94 in Halfmoon	
CR 97	2.60	4.18	Waterford village line	Fonda Road in Waterford	CR 96	
CR 98	1.23	1.98	CR 4 / CR 5	Batchellerville Bridge and Northville Road in Edinburg	CR 7	
CR 99	0.84	1.35	US 9	Church Hill Road in Halfmoon	CR 94 / CR 95	
CR 101	0.55	0.89	US 9 / CR 33	Corinth Mountain Road in Wilton	Becomes town road 0.55 miles (0.89 km) north of intersection	Originally proposed to extend to CR 24 in Corinth
CR 102	5.49	8.84	NY 50 at Saratoga Springs and Wilton line	Louden Road	NY 29 in Saratoga	Proposed but not implemented
CR 103	2.67	4.30	NY 32	Hayes Road in Saratoga	NY 29	Proposed but not implemented
CR 104	1.87	3.01	CR 21 in Greenfield	Murray Road	NY 29 in Milton	
CR 105	1.45	2.33	CR 45 / Paisley Road	West Milton Road in Milton	CR 49 / CR 43 (present terminus)	CR 49 re-routed onto entire length
CR 106	2.26	3.64	CR 45 / CR 49 (former routing) in Milton	Northline Road	CR 63 in Malta	Entire length incorporated into CR 45
CR 107	1.16	1.87	NY 423	Jack Halloran Road in Stillwater	CR 70 (formerly CR 72)	Proposed but not implemented
CR 108	2.26	3.64	US 9 / NY 67	Dunning Road in Malta	NY 9P	
CR 109	6.73	10.83	NY 146A in Clifton Park	Kinns and Farm to Market roads	NY 146 in Halfmoon	
CR 110	3.37	5.42	NY 146 / NY 914V in Clifton Park	Blue Barns and Kingsley roads	NY 50 in Ballston	
CR 111	1.68	2.70	NY 50	West Avenue in Saratoga Springs	NY 9N	Ownership transferred to city
CR 338	1.32	2.12	NY 29 in Saratoga	Monument Road and Burgoyne Street	US 4 / NY 32 in Schuylerville	Formerly NY 338
CR 339	0.94	1.51	NY 50 / CR 58	Lake Hill Road in Ballston	NY 146A	Formerly NY 339
CR 1117	1.79	2.88	Riverview Road	Grooms Road in Clifton Park	CR 91 (former terminus) / Miller and Sugar Hill roads	Formerly a portion of NY 146B
CR 1183	0.67	1.08	US 9	Maltaville Road in Malta	NY 67	Now a noncontiguous portion of CR 80
CR 1345	2.30	3.70	NY 146	Pruyn Hill Road in Halfmoon	Mechanicville city line	Former routing of NY 146

== See also ==
- County routes in New York
