= New York State Route 50 =

Highway in New York

New York State Route 50
- Map of the Capital District in New York with NY 50 highlighted in red and NY 911F in pink

Route information
- Maintained by NYSDOT and the city of Saratoga Springs
- Length: 31.67 mi (50.97 km)
- Existed: 1930–present

Major junctions
- South end: NY 5 in Scotia
- NY 146A in Ballston Lake; NY 67 in Ballston Spa; US 9 / NY 29 / NY 9N / NY 9P in Saratoga Springs; I-87 in Saratoga Springs
- North end: NY 32 in Northumberland

Location
- Country: United States
- State: New York
- Counties: Schenectady, Saratoga

Highway system
- New York Highways; Interstate; US; State; Reference; Parkways
← NY 49	→ NY 51

New York State Route 50 (NY 50) is a 31.67-mile (50.97 km) state highway in the Capital District of New York in the United States. The southern terminus of the route is at an intersection with NY 5 in Scotia. Its northern terminus is at a junction with NY 32 in the Saratoga County hamlet of Gansevoort.

== Route description ==
All but 1.85 miles (2.98 km) of NY 50 is maintained by the New York State Department of Transportation (NYSDOT). The lone locally maintained segment lies within the city of Saratoga Springs, where the route is city-maintained from the southern boundary of the city's inner district to Van Dam Street, a local street three blocks north of NY 9N and NY 29.

=== Scotia to Milton ===
NY 50 begins at an intersection with NY 5 (Mohawk Avenue) in the village of Scotia in the town of Glenville, just a couple blocks north of the Mohawk River. NY 50 winds northeastward through Scotia on North Ballston Avenue, crossing past Collins Lake on a two-lane residential street. Near the Cambridge Manor in Scotia, NY 50 crosses over the Hudson Subdivision, owned by Amtrak. Just north of the crossing, the route leaves Scotia and changes names to Ballston Road. At the junction with Swaggertown Road (unsigned County Route 43 or CR 43), NY 50 winds northeast into a junction with Freemans Bridge Road (unsigned NY 911F) in front of Schenectady County Airport.

After passing the airport, NY 50 continues northeast through Glenville, now with the Saratoga Road moniker. As the route enters the hamlet of Stoodley Corners, it turns northward, crossing a large commercial development that surrounds the intersection with Glenridge Road (unsigned NY 914V). Leaving Stoodley Corners, NY 50 winds northward through the hamlets of Mayfair and Woodruff Heights, crossing a junction with Charlton Road (CR 37), the route bends northeast into the hamlet of Harmon Park, a small community in Glenville. After a junction with High Mills Road (CR 33), NY 50 crosses the line from Schenectady County to Saratoga County.

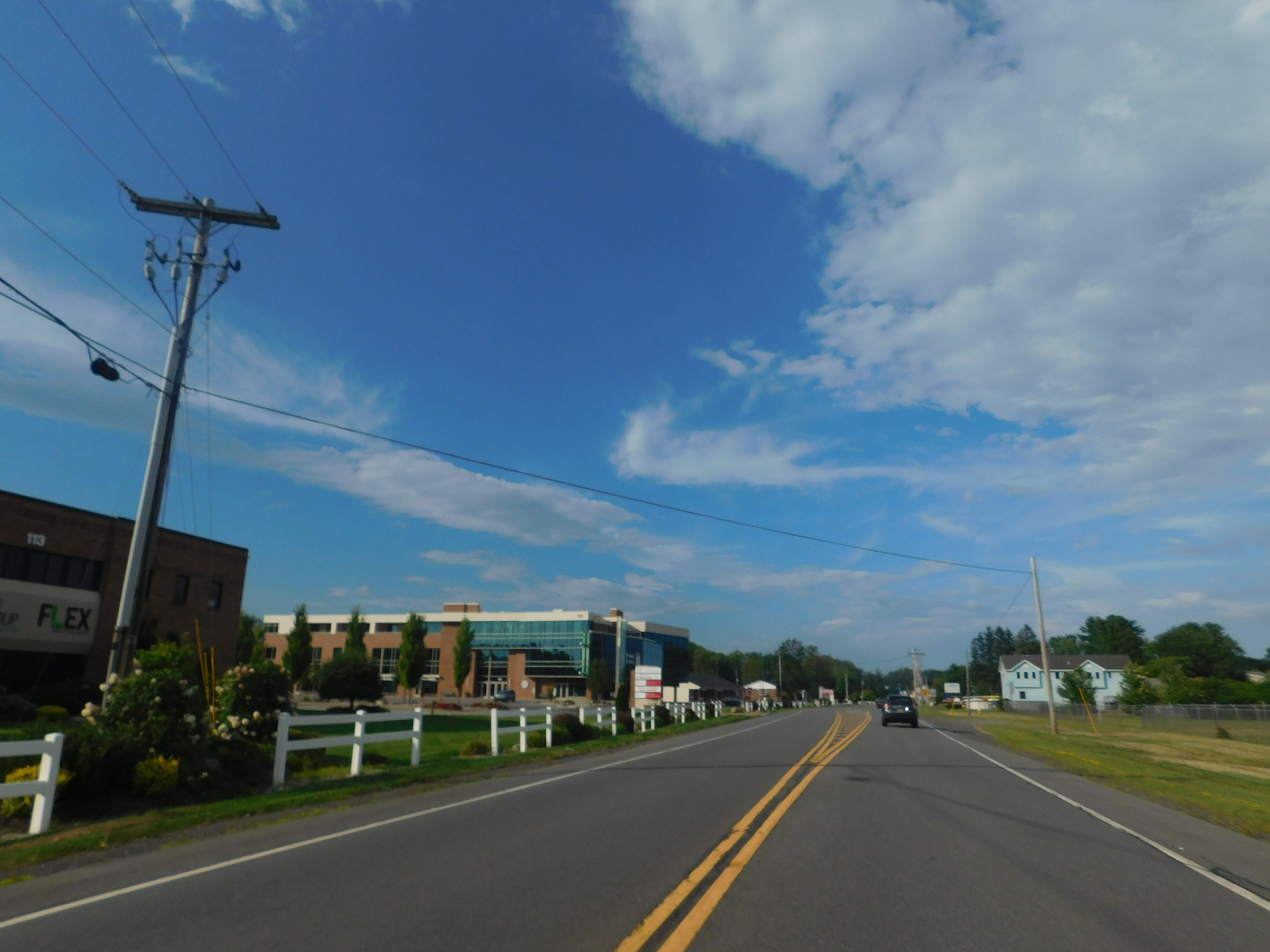
NY 50 northbound in Glenville

Now in the town of Ballston, NY 50 retains the Saratoga Road moniker, crossing northeast into the hamlet of Burnt Hills. In the center of Burnt Hills, NY 50 intersects with CR 58 (Lake Hill Road) and CR 339 (Lake Hill Road), which once served as the western terminus of NY 339. Continuing northeast out of Burnt Hills, NY 50 crosses a junction with CR 110 (Kingsley Road). At a junction with Larkin Road, NY 50 turns northward, reaching a junction with the northern terminus of NY 146A (Midline Road). Continuing northwest through Ballston, the route remains a two-lane residential roadway, soon turning north near a junction with Charlton Road.

NY 50 winds northward through Ballston, crossing the Mourning Kill, and a junction with CR 60 (Brookline Road) . The route winds northeast, reaching a junction with NY 67. At this junction, NY 50 and NY 67 become concurrent, dropping the Saratoga Road moniker, changing names to Church Avenue. Now entering a developed section of the town of Ballston, NY 50 and NY 67 crosses into the village of Ballston Spa, located in both the towns of Ballston and Milton. At the center of the village, NY 67 turns west away from NY 50 along West High Street, while NY 50 continues north through the village on Milton Avenue. A short distance later, the route forks to the northwest off Milton Avenue, changing names to Doubleday Avenue, exiting the village.

=== Milton to Gansevoort ===
NY 50 crosses northeast through Milton as Doubleday Avenue, crossing a junction with CR 64 (North Line Road). Just north of this junction, the route crosses into the city of Saratoga Springs, changing names to Ballston Avenue. Passing Saratoga Spa State Park, NY 50 parallels a railroad line before crossing over it within the park. At this point, NY 50 becomes a four-lane boulevard next to the Saratoga Spa State Park, crossing multiple at-grade junctions, including one with CR 43 (Geyser Road). Returning to its two-lane alignment, NY 50 winds northeast through Saratoga Springs, entering downtown as Ballston Avenue. Through the area south of downtown, the route is a two-lane commercial street, bending northeast into the junction with US 9 (South Broadway).

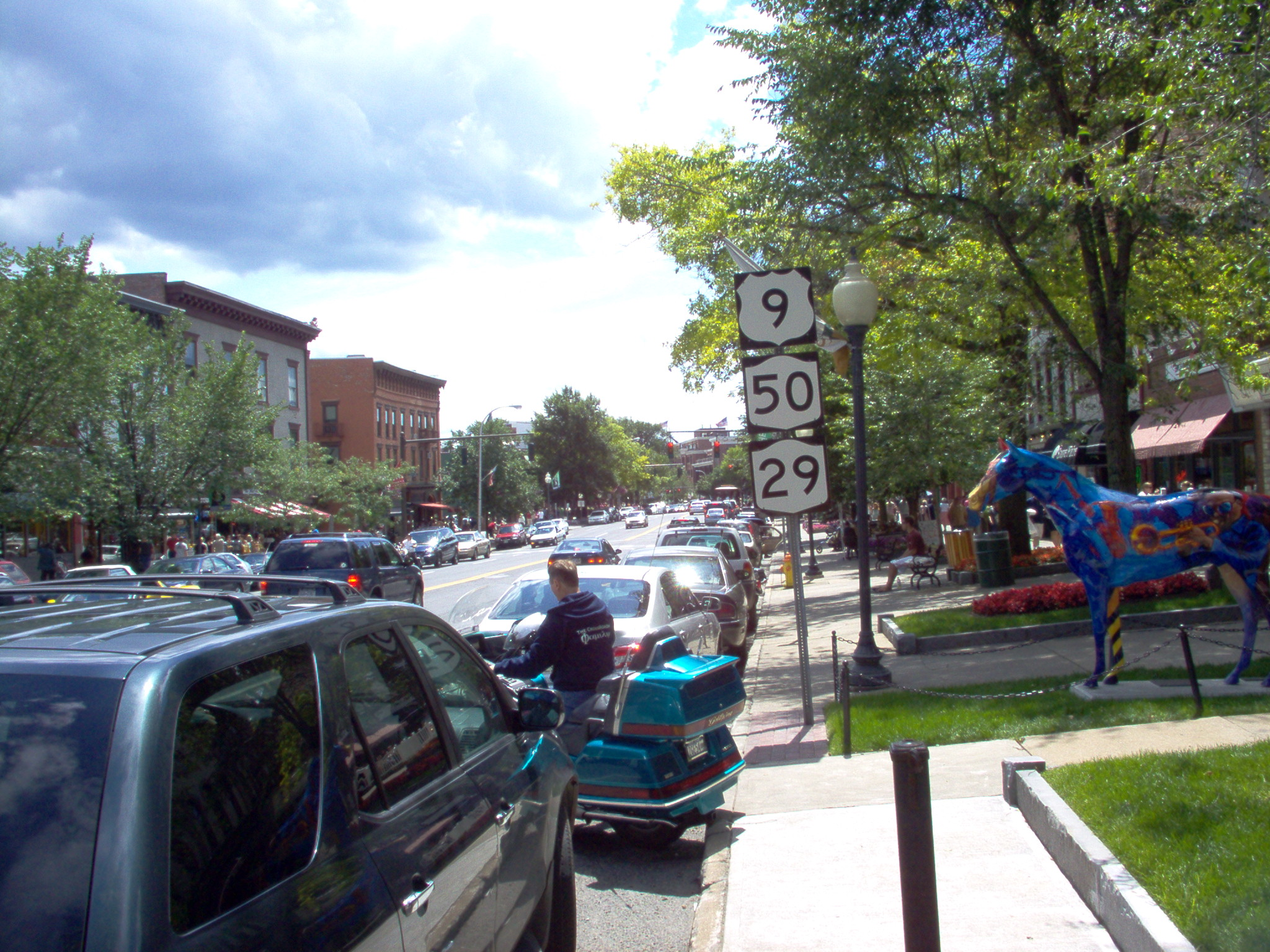
US 9, NY 50 and NY 29 concurrent through downtown Saratoga Springs

Now in the center of Saratoga Springs, US 9 and NY 50 become concurrent, proceeding north into the core of downtown as Broadway past Congress Park and a junction with the northern terminus of NY 9P (Spring Street). A block north of the junction, US 9 and NY 50 junction with NY 29 (Washington Street). US 9, NY 29 and NY 50 now are concurrent through the center of Saratoga Springs, reaching a junction with the southern terminus of NY 9N (Church Street), where NY 29 also turns east onto Lake Avenue. US 9 and NY 50 continue north through downtown, reaching the junction with Van Dam Street, where the routes turn northeast onto the C.V. Whitney Memorial Highway, a four-lane boulevard through Saratoga Springs. At the junction with Marion Avenue, US 9 continues north on Marion while NY 50 continues east on the Whitney.

NY 50 soon bends towards the east, passing along the southern shore of Loughberry Lake and into an interchange with the Adirondack Northway (I-87 exit 15). Now in the town of Wilton, NY 50 then reaches the northern terminus of Weibel Avenue, which is also designated as NY 29 Truck. The route enters the main commercial area of Wilton, passing the Wilton Mall at Saratoga before narrowing to a two-lane rural road proceeding northeast through Wilton. Beginning a parallel of the Meadow Brook, NY 50 crosses a junction with the western terminus of CR 39 (King Road). Passing south of the hamlet of Ballard Corners, NY 50 junctions with CR 33 (Ballard Road), becoming a residential road as it leaves Wilton.

After leaving Wilton, NY 50 crosses into the town of Northumberland. Through Northumberland, NY 50 winds northeast through town, remaining a two-lane residential street before turning northwest at Rice Brook. A short distance later, NY 50 enters the hamlet of Gansevoort, where it reaches a junction with NY 32 (Schuylerville Road). This intersection, located in front of Bertha E. Smith Park, marks the northern terminus of NY 50.

== History ==
When the first set of posted routes in New York were assigned in 1924, the portion of modern NY 50 south of Saratoga Springs was designated as part of NY 10, a north–south highway extending from the New Jersey state line near New York City to Saranac Lake via Albany and Saratoga Springs. In the 1930 renumbering of state highways in New York, NY 10 was realigned south of Long Lake to pass west of the Capital District on its way to the Southern Tier. The old alignment of NY 10 between Scotia and Saratoga Springs became part of the new NY 50, which continued north to Gansevoort along a previously unnumbered roadway.

By 1947, Erie Boulevard, Maxon Road, and Freemans Bridge Road were collectively designated as a spur of NY 50. As a result, the NY 50 designation effectively split in Glenville, with the west branch continuing south to Scotia and the east branch continuing southeast to NY 5 in Schenectady. The east branch was removed from maps at some point between 1958 and 1962; however, it was redesignated as a special route of NY 50 by 1968. While maps drawn by General Drafting labeled the route as "NY 50 Alternate", maps drawn by the H.M. Gousha Company labeled it as "NY 50 Spur". The special route was eliminated at some point in the late 1970s or early 1980s. The portion from Nott Street north to NY 50 remains state-maintained as NY 911F, an unsigned reference route.

== Major intersections ==
County	Location	mi	km	Destinations	Notes
Schenectady	Scotia	0.00	0.00	NY 5 (Mohawk Avenue) – Schenectady, Amsterdam	Southern terminus
Schenectady	Glenville	1.98	3.19	Freemans Bridge Road (NY 911F)	Northern terminus of NY 911F; former routing of NY 50
Schenectady	Glenville	3.49	5.62	NY 914V (Glenridge Road) to NY 146 – Clifton Park	Western terminus of NY 914V; hamlet of Stoodley Corners
Schenectady	Glenville	5.00	8.05	CR 31 (Hetcheltown Road)	Hamlet of East Glenville
Saratoga	Ballston	6.97	11.22	CR 58 / CR 339 (Lake Hill Road)	Former western terminus of NY 339; hamlet of Burnt Hills
Saratoga	Ballston	7.20	11.59	CR 110 (Kingsley Road) to NY 146 – Clifton Park	Hamlet of Burnt Hills
Saratoga	Ballston	8.36	13.45	NY 146A south (Midline Road) – Ballston Lake, Clifton Park	Northern terminus of NY 146A
Saratoga	Ballston	13.02	20.95	NY 67 east to I-87 – Malta, Round Lake	Southern terminus of NY 50 / NY 67 overlap
Saratoga	Ballston Spa	13.91	22.39	NY 67 west (West High Street) – Amsterdam	Northern terminus of NY 50 / NY 67 overlap
Saratoga	Saratoga Springs	20.19	32.49	US 9 south (Broadway) – Malta	Southern terminus of US 9 / NY 50 overlap
Saratoga	Saratoga Springs	20.49	32.98	NY 9P south (Spring Street) – Saratoga Lake	Northern terminus of NY 9P
Saratoga	Saratoga Springs	20.52	33.02	NY 29 west (Washington Avenue) – Galway, Johnstown, Gloversville	Southern terminus of NY 29 / NY 50 overlap
Saratoga	Saratoga Springs	20.74	33.38	NY 9N north (Church Street) / NY 29 east (Lake Avenue) / NY 29 Truck east – Corinth, Lake Luzerne, Lake George, Schuylerville	Southern terminus of NY 9N; northern terminus of NY 29 / NY 50 overlap; southern terminus of NY 29 Truck overlap; access to hospital via NY 9N
Saratoga	Saratoga Springs	21.72	34.95	US 9 north (Marion Avenue) / NY 9P Truck south – Glens Falls, Lake George, SUNY Adirondack	Northern terminus of US 9 / NY 50 overlap; southern terminus of NY 9P Truck; northern terminus of NY 9P Truck
Saratoga	Saratoga Springs	22.74	36.60	I-87 (Adirondack Northway) / NY 9P Truck – Albany, Montreal	Exit 15 (I-87); northern terminus of NY 9P Truck; NY 9P Truck follows I-87 south
Saratoga	Saratoga Springs–Wilton city/town line	22.94	36.92	NY 29 Truck east (Louden Road) to NY 29	Northern terminus of NY-29 Truck overlap
Saratoga	Wilton	25.86	41.62	Ballard Road/Taylor Road (CR 33) to I-87	Eastern terminus of CR 33; hamlet of Ballard Corners
Saratoga	Northumberland	31.67	50.97	NY 32 (Schuylerville Road) – Glens Falls, Schuylerville	Northern terminus, hamlet of Gansevoort
1.000 mi = 1.609 km; 1.000 km = 0.621 mi: Concurrency terminus
