= New York State Route 146A =

State highway in Saratoga County, New York, US

New York State Route 146A
- Map of Saratoga County in eastern New York with NY 146A highlighted in red

Route information
- Auxiliary route of NY 146
- Maintained by NYSDOT
- Length: 6.38 mi (10.27 km)
- Existed: early 1931–present

Major junctions
- South end: NY 146 / CR 90 in Clifton Park
- North end: NY 50 in Ballston

Location
- Country: United States
- State: New York
- Counties: Saratoga

Highway system
- New York Highways; Interstate; US; State; Reference; Parkways
| ← NY 146 | → NY 146B |

New York State Route 146A (NY 146A) is a state highway in New York State. It begins at NY 146 in Clifton Park and ends at NY 50 in Ballston Lake. It is located entirely within Saratoga County. Route 146A is the last existing spur of NY 146 in Saratoga and Schenectady counties.

== Route description ==
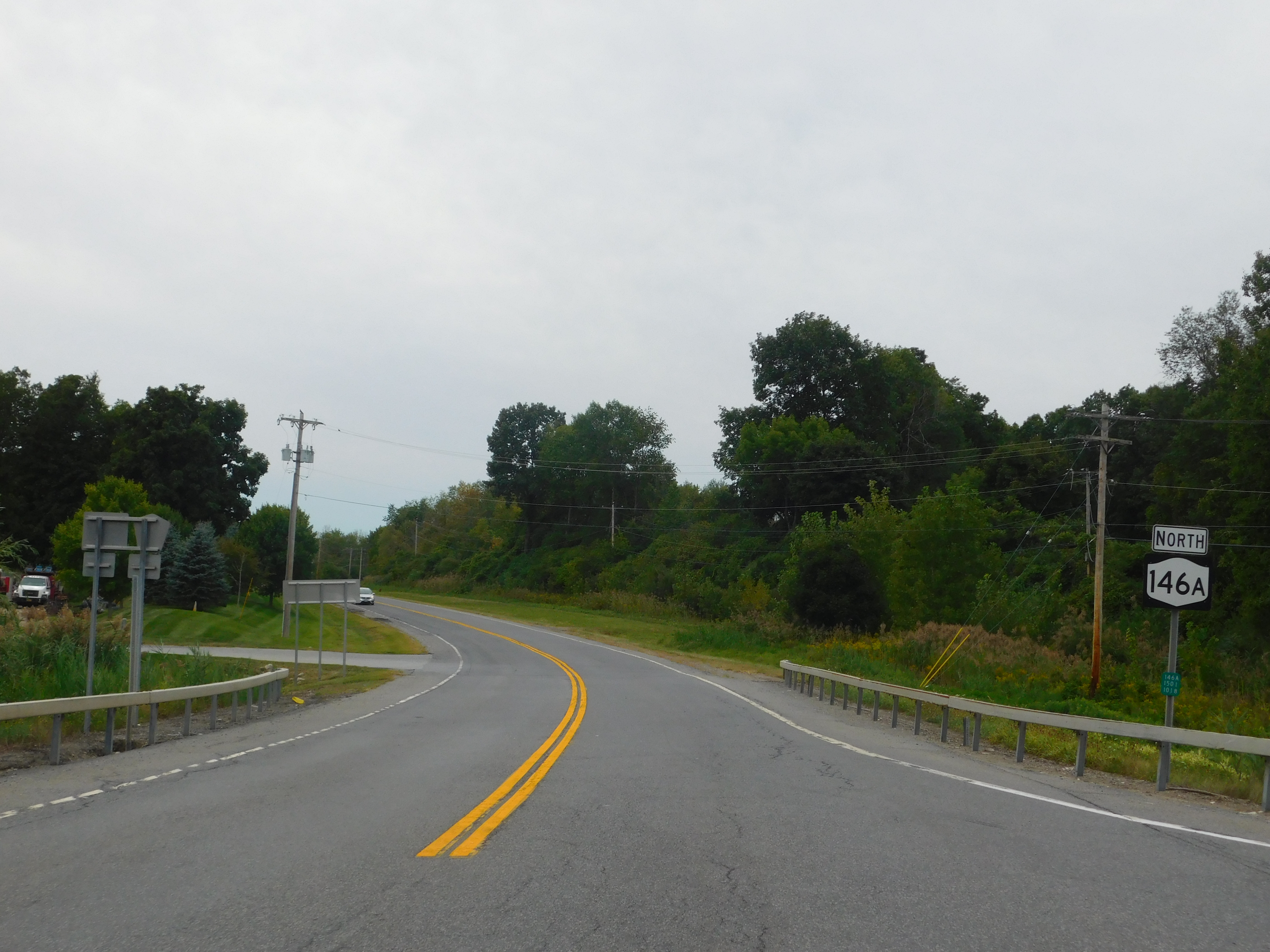
NY 146A north in Ballston

A two-lane highway, NY 146A heads northward as Vischer Ferry Road from a four-way intersection with NY 146 at Vischer Ferry Road (County Route 90 or CR 90), which continues southward from that intersection to Crescent Road (CR 92) in Vischer Ferry. After passing over a railway, NY 146A turns westward and becomes Ballston Lake Road, passing by the Van Patten Golf Course and a link to Ushers. After crossing Ashdown Road, NY 146A turns northward, descending into the hamlet of Ballston Lake, where it has a railroad crossing. After passing the eastern terminus of CR 339, it becomes Midline Road, heading northward to its eventual terminus at NY 50.

== History ==
In 1908, the New York State Legislature created Route 25, an unsigned legislative route extending from Whitesboro to Albany by way of the southern portion of Adirondack Park. From Saratoga Springs to Albany, Route 25 used what is now NY 50, NY 146A, and U.S. Route 9. The segment of legislative Route 25 from Ballston Lake to Clifton Park was designated as NY 146A in early 1931.

== Major intersections ==
The entire route is in Saratoga County.

| Location | mi | km | Destinations | Notes |
|---|---|---|---|---|
| Town of Clifton Park | 0.00 | 0.00 | NY 146 / CR 90 south (Vischer Ferry Road) – Schenectady, Clifton Park, Vischer Ferry | Southern terminus; northern terminus of CR 90; roundabout |
| Town of Ballston | 5.36 | 8.63 | CR 339 (Lake Hill Road) – Burnt Hills | Eastern terminus of former NY 339; hamlet of Ballston Lake |
| Town of Ballston | 6.38 | 10.27 | NY 50 (Saratoga Road) – Burnt Hills, Ballston Spa | Northern terminus |
1.000 mi = 1.609 km; 1.000 km = 0.621 mi
