= New York State Route 339 =

Former state highway in New York State

New York State Route 339
- Lake Hill Road
- NY 339 highlighted in red

Route information
- Maintained by NYSDOT
- Length: 0.94 mi (1,510 m)
- Existed: by 1946–1973

Major junctions
- West end: NY 50 in Ballston
- East end: NY 146A in Ballston

Location
- Country: United States
- State: New York
- Counties: Saratoga

Highway system
- New York Highways; Interstate; US; State; Reference; Parkways
← NY 338	→ NY 340

New York State Route 339 (NY 339) was a 0.94-mile-long (1.51 km) state highway located within the town of Ballston in Saratoga County, New York, in the United States. The road's western terminus was at an intersection with NY 50 and County Route 58 (CR 58) in the hamlet of Burnt Hills. Its eastern terminus was at a junction with NY 146A near the hamlet of Ballston Lake.

NY 339 was assigned to the entirety of its alignment by 1946. It was removed from the state highway system and turned over to Saratoga County in 1973, at which time NY 339's former routing became County Route 339.

== Route description ==
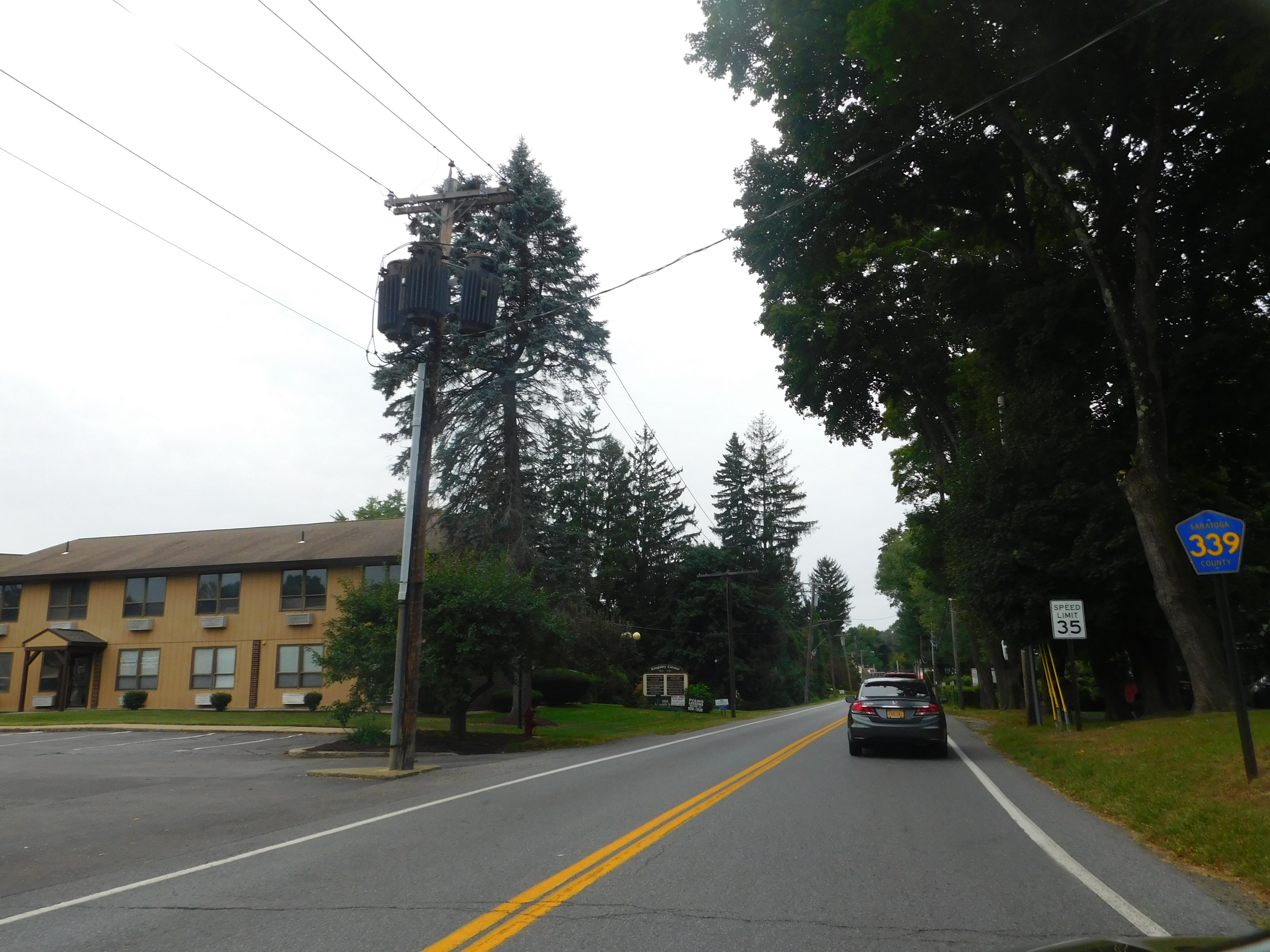
Saratoga CR 339 westbound in Ballston

NY 339 began at an intersection with NY 50 in the hamlet of Burnt Hills within the Saratoga County town of Ballston. The road headed eastward on Lake Hill Road, intersecting with CR 110 just 0.2 miles (0.3 km) east of NY 50. NY 339 then veered slightly towards the northeast, intersecting with several local roads as it approached Ballston Lake. NY 339 came to an end at NY 146A west of the lake and northwest of the hamlet of Ballston Lake.

== History ==
The entirety of NY 339 was assigned by 1946. It remained unchanged up through 1973, at which time NY 339 was removed from the state highway system. The former routing of NY 339 is now maintained by Saratoga County as CR 339.

== Major intersections ==
The entire route was in Ballston, Saratoga County.

mi	km	Destinations	Notes
0.00	0.00	NY 50 / CR 58	Hamlet of Burnt Hills; eastern terminus of CR 58
0.20	0.32	CR 110	
0.94	1.51	NY 146A	Hamlet of Ballston Lake
1.000 mi = 1.609 km; 1.000 km = 0.621 mi

== See also ==
- List of county routes in Saratoga County, New York
