= New York State Route 146B =

Highway in New York

New York State Route 146B
- Map of the Schenectady area with NY 146B highlighted in red

Route information
- Auxiliary route of NY 146
- Maintained by State of New York Department of Public Works
- Length: 3.05 mi (4.91 km)
- Existed: c. 1932–c. 1965

Major junctions
- West end: NY 146 in Clifton Park
- East end: Miller and Sugarhill roads in Clifton Park

Location
- Country: United States
- State: New York
- Counties: Saratoga

Highway system
- New York Highways; Interstate; US; State; Reference; Parkways
| ← NY 146A | → NY 146C |

New York State Route 146B (NY 146B) was a state highway in southern Saratoga County, New York, in the United States. It was 3 miles (4.8 km) long and located entirely within the town of Clifton Park. The western terminus of the route was at an intersection with NY 146, its parent route, in the hamlet of Rexford. The eastern terminus of NY 146B was in the hamlet of Groom Corners, where it met Miller and Sugarhill roads. NY 146B was assigned c. 1932 and removed c. 1965. Its former routing is now the western portion of County Route 91 (CR 91).

== Route description ==
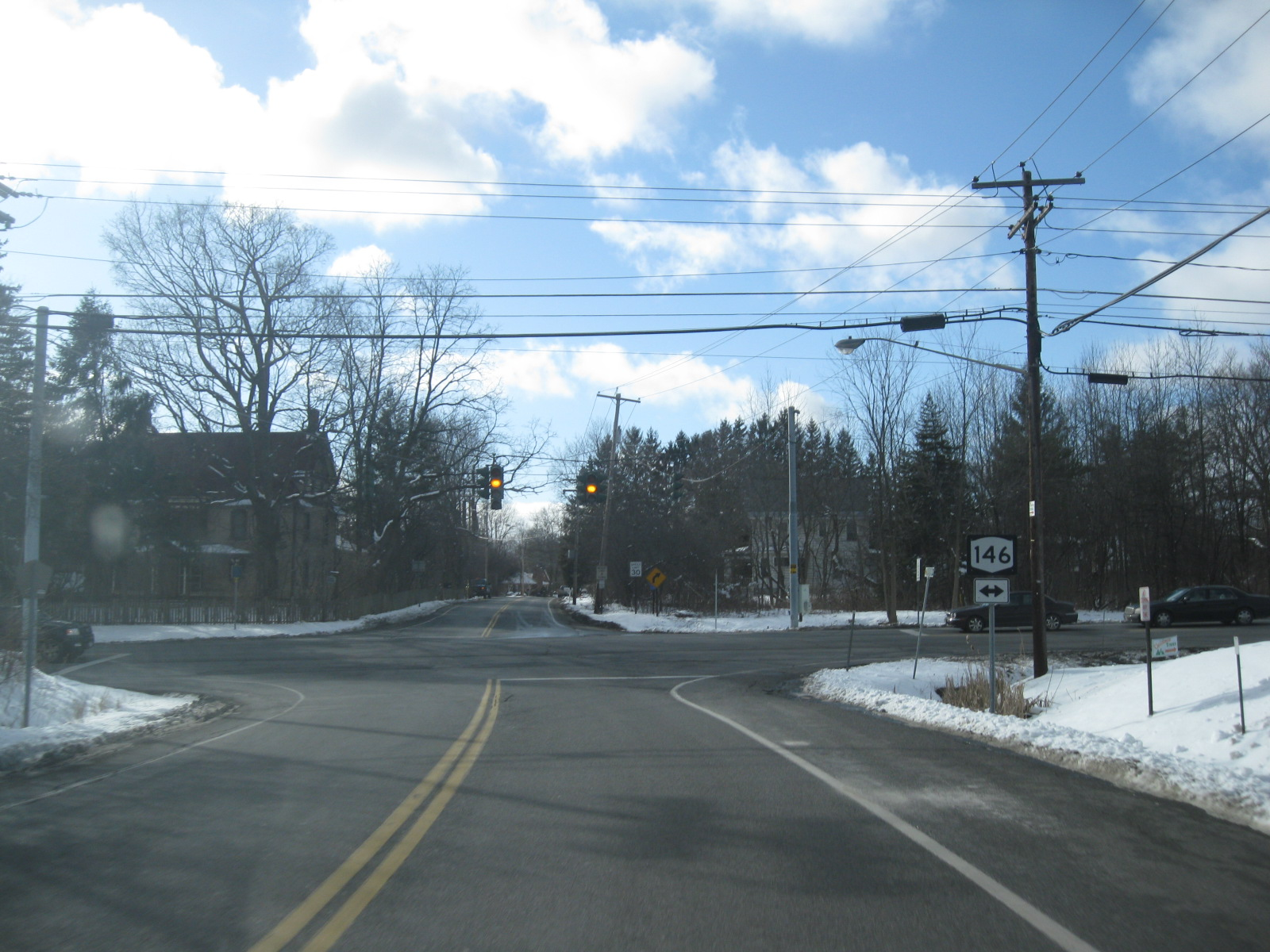
Former western terminus of NY 146B at NY 146 in Rexford

NY 146B began at an intersection with NY 146 in Rexford, a small riverside hamlet in the town of Clifton Park. The route headed southeastward on Riverview Road, following the northern bank of the Mohawk River (also part of the Erie Canal) through the town. It passed to the south of the Edison Country Club and remained on the riverbank to an intersection with Grooms Road approximately 1 mile (1.6 km) southeast of Rexford. Here, NY 146B turned eastward to follow Grooms Road to the hamlet of Groom Corners, a community based around the intersection of Grooms, Miller and Sugarhill roads. NY 146B ended at this junction; however, Grooms Road continued eastward to a junction with U.S. Route 9 (US 9) in the town of Halfmoon.

== History ==
On July 11, 1916, New York let a contract for improving a series of roadways linking Groom Corners to Waite Corners by way of Rexford Flats (now Rexford). Approximately half of the project was complete by 1920, while the remainder was completed by 1926. In the 1930 renumbering of state highways in New York, the portion of the Groom Corners–Waite Corners highway from Rexford to Waite Corners became part of the new NY 146. The remainder of the highway from Rexford to Groom Corners was designated as NY 146B, a spur route of NY 146, c. 1932. NY 146B remained unchanged until c. 1965, when the designation was removed from the highway. The former routing of NY 146B is now part of CR 91, which continues eastward on Grooms Road to meet US 9 in the town of Halfmoon. Additionally, the Riverview Road portion of old NY 146B is now part of the Mohawk Towpath Scenic Byway, a National Scenic Byway.

== Major intersections ==
The entire route was in Clifton Park, Saratoga County.

| mi | km | Destinations | Notes |
|---|---|---|---|
| 0.0 | 0.0 | NY 146 | Hamlet of Rexford |
| 3.0 | 4.8 | Miller Road / Sugarhill Road | Hamlet of Groom Corners |
1.000 mi = 1.609 km; 1.000 km = 0.621 mi
