= New York State Route 146 =

Highway in New York

New York State Route 146
- Map of the Capital District with NY 146 highlighted in red, and former alignments now maintained as reference routes in pink

Route information
- Maintained by NYSDOT, Schenectady County, and the city of Schenectady
- Length: 42.80 mi (68.88 km)
- Existed: 1930–present
- Tourist routes: Mohawk Towpath Scenic Byway

Major junctions
- West end: NY 443 in Wright
- US 20 in Guilderland; I-890 in Rotterdam; NY 5 in Schenectady; I-87 in Clifton Park; US 9 in Halfmoon
- East end: US 4 / NY 32 in Halfmoon

Location
- Country: United States
- State: New York
- Counties: Schoharie, Albany, Schenectady, Saratoga

Highway system
- New York Highways; Interstate; US; State; Reference; Parkways
← NY 145	→ NY 146A

New York State Route 146 (NY 146) is a state highway in the Capital District of New York in the United States. It extends for 43 miles (69 km) from Gallupville at NY 443 to near Mechanicville at U.S. Route 4 (US 4) and NY 32. NY 146 is a major thoroughfare in the city of Schenectady, just outside Albany. Most of the route follows an east–west alignment; however, the middle third of the route between Guilderland and Clifton Park runs in a more north–south manner in order to serve Schenectady. At one time, NY 146 had three spur routes; only one—NY 146A—still exists.

NY 146 was assigned as part of the 1930 renumbering of state highways in New York. At the time, NY 146 began at modern NY 443 in Berne and followed what is now NY 156 northeast to Altamont while modern NY 146 west of Altamont was part of NY 156. The alignments of the two routes were flipped in the late 1930s. Other minor realignments have occurred since, most notably near Mechanicville.

== Route description ==
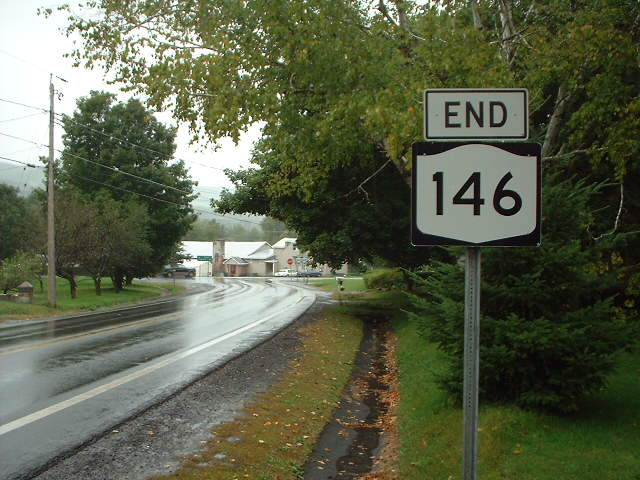
NY 146 westbound approaching its western terminus at NY 443 in Gallupville

=== Schoharie and Albany counties ===
NY 146 begins at a T-intersection with NY 443 in Gallupville, a hamlet within the town of Wright. The highway spends only 4.24 miles (6.82 km) in Schoharie County before passing into neighboring Albany County. Along this stretch, NY 146 has an intersection with County Route 26 (CR 26, named Larry Hill Road) just over 1 mile (1.6 km) from NY 443. After crossing into Albany County, NY 146 turns eastward and heads toward Albany, the capital of New York. In the Knox hamlet of West, NY 146 intersects CR 259. As NY 146 reaches the hamlet of East a short time later, it meets CRs 252, 260, 261, and 262 in quick succession. NY 146 continues eastward, passing through a rural area of Albany County on its way to the town of Guilderland and the village of Altamont contained within.

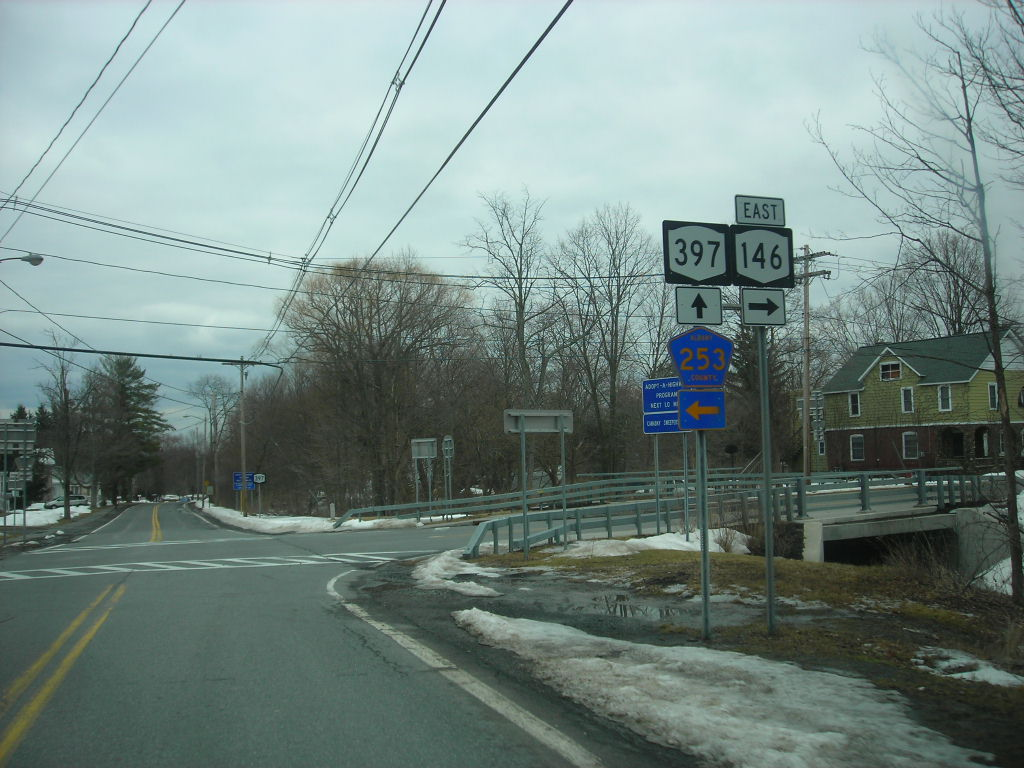
NY 146 at the intersection with NY 397 and Albany CR 253 in Altamont

NY 146 enters Altamont from the west on Western Avenue. At Maple Avenue, NY 146 turns south to follow that street for two blocks while NY 397 begins on the road that NY 146 vacates. NY 146 leaves Maple Avenue at Main Street, which connects to NY 156 one block to the west. Both NY 156 and NY 146 are marked with signs directing traffic to the other route by way of this one block of Main Street. NY 146 heads east from Maple Avenue, following Main Street eastward out of the village. After leaving Altamont, NY 146 continues for about 3 miles (5 km) through a lightly populated portion of Guilderland before intersecting with the southern terminus of NY 158. The route progresses onward, intersecting CRs 201 and 202 and passing over the CSX Transportation-owned Selkirk Subdivision railroad line and Normans Kill before meeting US 20 at Hartmans Corners. NY 146 joins US 20 for about 0.7 miles (1.1 km) northwestward to McCormack Corners, where NY 146 leaves US 20 and heads northward toward Schenectady County. The route passes over the New York State Thruway (Interstate 90 or I-90) just south of the county line.

=== Schenectady and Saratoga counties ===
At the county line, Fort Hunter Road (CR 71) leaves to the left just before an interchange with the New York State Thruway. NY 146 continues on through Rotterdam, meeting NY 7 at a junction about 2 miles (3.2 km) south of Schenectady. The route continues on, paralleling I-890 into the Schenectady city limits at Glengary Avenue. Here, maintenance of the route shifts from the New York State Department of Transportation (NYSDOT) to the city of Schenectady. Five blocks later, NY 146 intersects with Altamont Avenue (unsigned NY 911H) just before crossing over I-890 and entering Schenectady's downtown district. In downtown Schenectady, NY 146 follows Brandywine Avenue northeastward past an intersection with NY 5 (State Street) to Union Street, where the route turns to follow Union eastward out of the city. Upon crossing into Niskayuna, ownership of the route shifts to Schenectady County, which maintains the roadway as CR 159. CR 159 ends five blocks later at Balltown Road (unsigned NY 914T). NY 146 turns north onto Balltown, becoming NYSDOT maintained once more in the process.

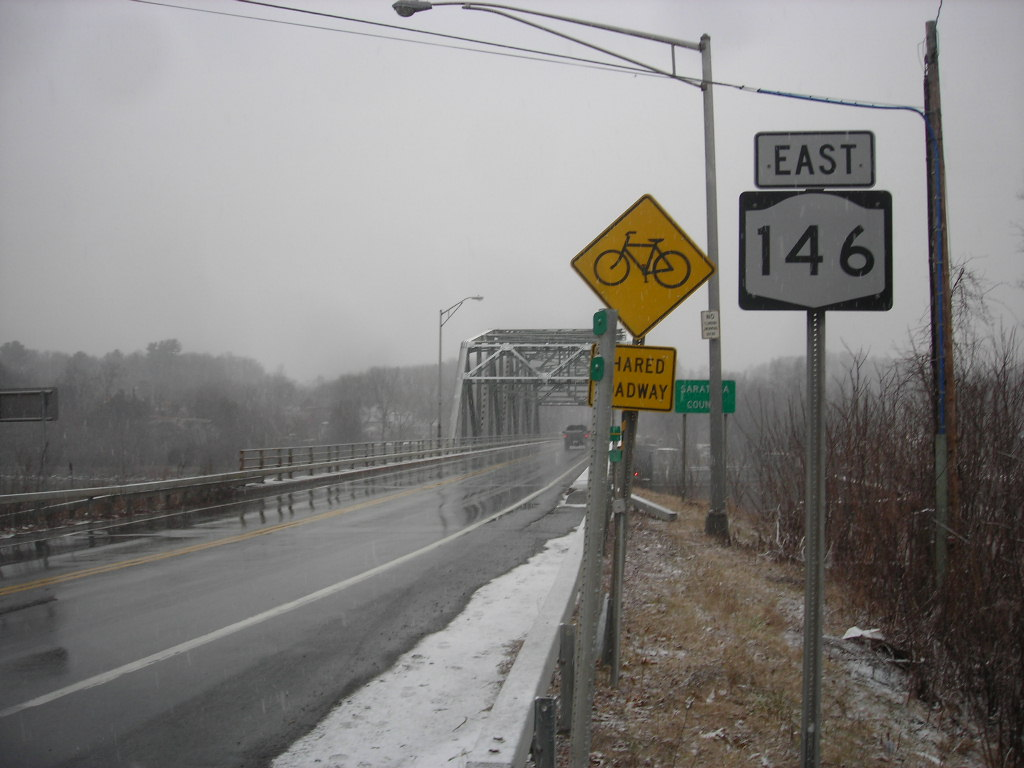
NY 146 crossing over the Mohawk River on the Rexford Bridge

3.5 miles (5.6 km) north of Union Street, NY 146 crosses over the Mohawk River on the Rexford Bridge and enters Saratoga County. On the north bank of the river in Clifton Park, CR 88 and CR 91 terminate at NY 146 in opposite directions. This portion of CR 91 was once part of NY 146B, a former spur of NY 146. The route turns eastward three-quarters of a mile (1.2 km) later at a junction with Glenridge Road (unsigned NY 914V) and CR 110. Just outside Clifton Park Center, NY 146 meets NY 146A, the lone remaining spur of NY 146. Soon after the NY 146A intersection, the route encounters I-87 (the Adirondack Northway) at exit 9 and intersects US 9. About 2 miles (3.2 km) east of US 9 in Halfmoon, NY 236 merges in from the south. NY 146 veers northward at this junction, then breaks eastward a mile (1.6 km) later at an intersection with CR 1345 southwest of Mechanicville. NY 146 comes to an end soon afterward at US 4 and NY 32 south of Mechanicville on the banks of the Hudson River.

== History ==
NY 146 was assigned as part of the 1930 renumbering of state highways in New York and originally extended from NY 43 (now NY 443) in Berne northeast through Schenectady to US 4 and NY 32 in Mechanicville. The portion of the route northeast of Altamont generally followed its modern alignment; however, west of Altamont, NY 146 followed what is now NY 156 to Berne while NY 156 was routed on modern NY 146 to Gallupville. Although it was signed as part of NY 156, the Gallupville–Altamont highway was locally maintained until 1939, when it was acquired by the state of New York. The alignments of NY 146 and NY 156 west of Altamont were flipped c. 1940, placing NY 146 on the new state highway. Most of former NY 146 west of Altamont became part of NY 156, save for a one-block section of Main Street within the village. It is now designated as NY 912C, an unsigned 0.08-mile (0.13 km) reference route serving a connector between NY 156 and NY 146, which do not meet despite both highways using Main Street as an entrance to the village.

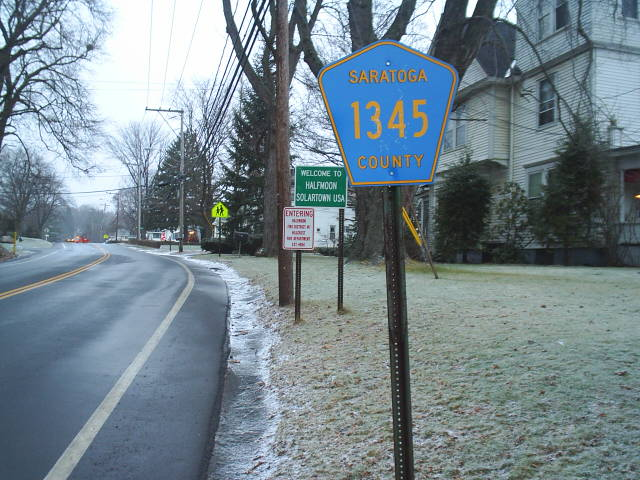
CR 1345 entering the town of Halfmoon

In Schenectady, NY 146 was originally routed on Union, Jay, and Nott Streets and Van Vranken Avenue through the northern portion of the city. It was realigned between 1938 and 1947 to bypass the northern part of the city on Balltown Road. The New York State Department of Transportation (NYSDOT) has reserved the NY 646 designation for the former routing of NY 146 through Schenectady; however, there is no timetable for its assignment. In Halfmoon, NY 146 was initially routed on Pruyn Hill Road and South Street in the vicinity of Mechanicville. The route was altered in the late 1940s to follow a new highway that bypassed Mechanicville to the south. The portion of NY 146's former routing outside of the Mechanicville city limits is now designated and signed as CR 1345, reflecting the number of the legislative state highway (SH 1345) that makes up the portion of NY 146 in Halfmoon and thus once followed Pruyn Hill Road.

In 2007, the New York State Department of Transportation (NYSDOT) has identified the NY 146 corridor from Riverview Road to Glen Ridge Road as in need of future improvements. Intersection improvements are scheduled at the NY 146 / Aqueduct Road / Williams Road and NY 146 / Riverview Road intersections. This part of the project will be built in 2008 and is to include new turn lanes at each intersection. To the south, the Rexford Bridge over the Mohawk River and the surrounding roadway will be improved in stages, with completion expected by 2017. The objective of these projects is to improve highway capacity and safety along the corridor.

NYSDOT has completed construction on a roundabout at the intersection of NY 146 and NY 146A / CR 90 in Clifton Park.

== Major intersections ==
County	Location	mi	km	Destinations	Notes
Schoharie	Wright	0.00	0.00	NY 443 – Berne, Schoharie	Western terminus; hamlet of Gallupville
Albany	Altamont	11.37	18.30	NY 397 north (Western Avenue) / CR 253 west (Maple Avenue) – Dunnsville	Southern terminus of NY 397; eastern terminus of CR 253
Albany	Altamont	11.70	18.83	Main Street (NY 912C west) to NY 156 – Voorheesville, Knox, John Boyd Thacher State Park	Eastern terminus of unsigned NY 912C
Albany	Guilderland	14.06	22.63	NY 158 – Schenectady	Southern terminus of NY 158
Albany	Guilderland	17.71	28.50	US 20 east (Western Avenue) – Albany	Eastern end of concurrency with US 20; hamlet of Hartmans Corners
Albany	Guilderland	18.39	29.60	US 20 west (Western Avenue) – Duanesburg	Western end of concurrency with US 20; hamlet of McCormack Corners
Schenectady	Rotterdam	21.72	34.95	To I-90 / New York Thruway	Access via I-890 east
Schenectady	Rotterdam	22.08	35.53	NY 7 (Curry Road) to I-890 west – Troy, Duanesburg	
Schenectady	Schenectady	24.72	39.78	NY 5 (State Street) – Scotia, Albany	No westbound left turn
Schenectady	Niskayuna	25.47	40.99	Balltown Road (NY 914T south) / Union Street (NY 911G east) to NY 7 – Troy	Northern terminus of unsigned NY 914T; western terminus of unsigned NY 911G
Schenectady	Niskayuna	28.01	45.08	CR 19 east (River Road) / Providence Avenue – Knolls Atomic Power Laboratory	Western terminus of CR 19
Schenectady	Niskayuna	30.05	48.36	CR 10 west (Aqueduct Road) / Williams Street / Mohawk Towpath Scenic Byway	Roundabout; eastern terminus of CR 10
Mohawk River		30.06	48.38	Rexford Bridge	
Saratoga	Clifton Park	31.97	51.45	CR 88 east / CR 91 west (Riverview Road) / Mohawk Towpath Scenic Byway	Hamlet of Rexford; former western terminus of NY 146B; western terminus of CR 88; eastern terminus of CR 91
Saratoga	Clifton Park	32.07	51.61	CR 110 north (Blue Barns Road) / Glenridge Road (NY 914V) to NY 50 – Glenville, Burnt Hills	Southern terminus of CR 110
Saratoga	Clifton Park	35.07	56.44	NY 146A north / CR 90 south (Vischer Ferry Road) – Ballston Lake, Ballston, Vischer Ferry	Roundabout; southern terminus of NY 146A; northern terminus of CR 90
Saratoga	Clifton Park	37.45	60.27	I-87 – Albany, Montreal	Exit 9 (I-87); partial cloverleaf interchange; hamlet of Clifton Park
Saratoga	Halfmoon	37.77	60.78	US 9 (Halfmoon Parkway) – Albany, Saratoga Springs	
Saratoga	Halfmoon	40.03	64.42	NY 236 south – Albany	Northern terminus of NY 236; hamlet of Newtown
Saratoga	Halfmoon	42.80	68.88	US 4 / NY 32 – Mechanicville, Stillwater, Waterford	Eastern terminus
1.000 mi = 1.609 km; 1.000 km = 0.621 mi: Concurrency terminus; Electronic toll collection; Incomplete access

== Suffixed routes ==
As many as three spurs once led from NY 146; however, two no longer exist.

- NY 146A is a short 6.38-mile (10.27 km) road in Clifton Park and Ballston Lake that connects NY 146 in Clifton Park to NY 50 in Ballston Lake. It was assigned c. 1932.
- NY 146B was a spur in the town of Clifton Park. It began at NY 146 in the hamlet of Rexford and ended in the hamlet of Groom Corners. It was assigned c. 1932 and removed c. 1965. Its routing is now part of CR 91.
- NY 146C was a connector between NY 7 and NY 146 in Rotterdam. The route was assigned in the mid-1930s and replaced with a rerouted NY 7 c. 1962.

== See also ==
- List of county routes in Saratoga County, New York
- List of county routes in Schenectady County, New York
