= New York State Route 914T =

State highway in Schenectady County, New York, US

New York State Route 914T
- Balltown Road
- NY 914T highlighted in red

Route information
- Maintained by NYSDOT
- Length: 1.93 mi (3.11 km)
- Existed: April 1, 1980–present

Major junctions
- South end: NY 5 in Niskayuna
- North end: NY 146 in Niskayuna

Location
- Country: United States
- State: New York
- Counties: Schenectady

Highway system
- New York Highways; Interstate; US; State; Reference; Parkways

New York State Route 914T (NY 914T) is an unsigned reference route designation for the portion of Balltown Road south of Union Street in Schenectady, New York, in the United States. The route is a short two-lane highway just east of the city limits, running from NY 5 to its intersection with Union Street where NY 146 meets. East of Balltown Road, Union Street is maintained by the New York State Department of Transportation as unsigned NY 911G; however, there are no markers to this effect. Balltown Road is nearly north–south with very few turns. It eventually reaches the town of Ballston in Saratoga County.

== Route description ==
NY 914T begins at an intersection with NY 5 in Niskayuna. The road heads north and passes to the west of Mohawk Commons Mall soon after the southern terminus. After 0.8 miles (1.3 km), NY 914T intersects with Consaul Road (County Route 9). As the highway passes through the urbanized areas of Schenectady County, it passes local attractions, such as the Schenectady Municipal Golf Course. After intersecting with NY 7, NY 914T heads north to its northern terminus with NY 146 in Niskayuna.

== History ==
The portion of Balltown Road between NY 5 and NY 146 was originally a county road maintained by Schenectady County. On April 1, 1980, ownership and maintenance of this section of Balltown Road was transferred from the county to the state of New York as part of a highway maintenance swap between the two levels of government. It was subsequently designated as the unsigned NY 914T.

== Future ==
Reference markers on this highway are marked "546" south of NY 7. North of that, markers indicate 146, indicating that NY 146 may have once been concurrent with NY 7 through Schenectady with a split at that point. Although no touring route signage for NY 546 exists, the New York State Department of Transportation has reserved the number for Balltown Road.

== Major intersections ==
The entire route is in Niskayuna, Schenectady County.

mi	km	Destinations	Notes
0.00	0.00	NY 5 (State Street)	Southern terminus
1.75	2.82	NY 7 (Crosstown Connection) – Troy	No southbound left turn to NY 7 east
1.93	3.11	NY 146 (Union Street / Balltown Road north)	Northern terminus; continues north as NY 146
1.93	3.11	Union Street ( NY 911G)	Western terminus of unsigned NY 911G
1.000 mi = 1.609 km; 1.000 km = 0.621 mi
