= Bridge 8, Erie Canal =

Bridge 8
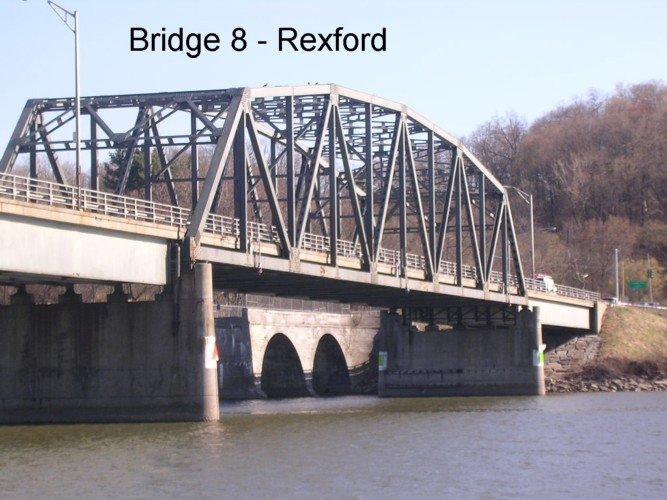
- Coordinates: 42°51′01″N 73°53′16″W
- Carries: Four lanes of NY 146
- Crosses: Mohawk River (Erie Canal)
- Locale: Rexford, New York
- Other name: Rexford Bridge
- Owner: New York State Department of Transportation

Characteristics
- Design: Beam
- Material: Steel
- Total length: 770 ft (230 m)
- Width: 70 ft (21 m)
- Height: 22.9 ft (7.0 m)
- No. of spans: 4
- Load limit: 32.2 tons (29.21 t)

History
- Designer: AECOM/Tioga Construction
- Opened: 2017
- Replaces: Bridge 8

Location
- Interactive map of Bridge 8

Bridge 8, known locally as the Rexford Bridge, is a four-lane bridge crossing the Mohawk River (Erie Canal) northeast of the city of Schenectady in New York, United States. It carries New York State Route 146 (NY 146) from Schenectady County to Rexford, a hamlet in the Saratoga County town of Clifton Park.

Near the bridge is the historic remains of the 1842 Erie Canal Aqueduct. The 1842 aqueduct replaced the original 1824 aqueduct at this site when the Erie Canal was enlarged during the years of 1835–1862. The aqueduct was demolished in 1918 upgrades to form the New York State Barge Canal. Three of the 14 arches can still be seen today, one on the Saratoga side and two on the Schenectady side.

== 2017 bridge ==
The 2017 bridge is a 4 lane beam bridge constructed to replace the 1965 bridge due to advance age and increased traffic. The new bridge was built though a design-build project with Tioga Construction and AECOM, and opened in 2017. The project included widening NY 146 in Rexford, constructing a 2 lane roundabout south of the bridge, and constructing a new multi use trail.

== 1965 bridge ==
The 1965 bridge is a two-lane truss bridge crossing the Mohawk River (Erie Canal) to the east of the current bridge. The bridge was designed by the New York State Department of Public Works and opened in 1965. It has a total length of 727 feet (222 m) and a main span of 266 feet (81 m).

== Gallery ==
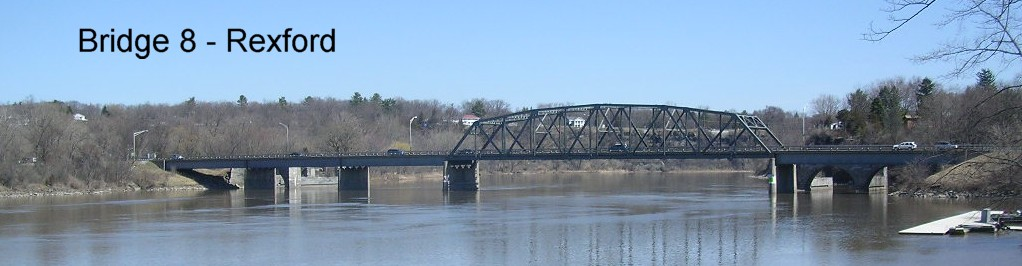
View of the 1965 bridge facing east

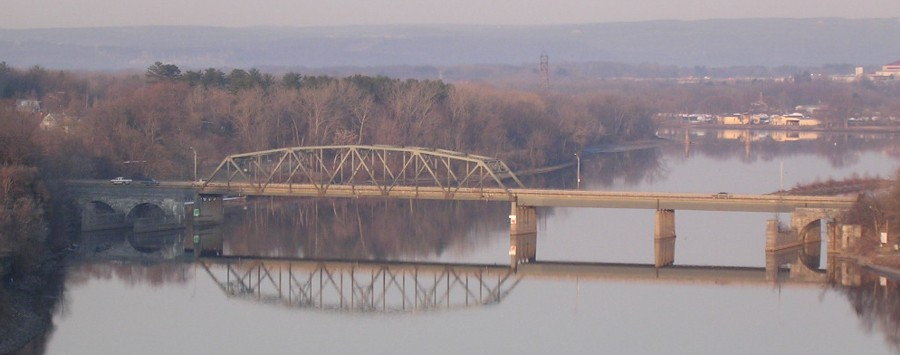
View of the 1965 bridge facing west

West	Erie Canal Locks	East
Bridge 10	Bridge 8, Erie Canal	Lock 7 and Bridge 7B
