= Loughberry Lake =

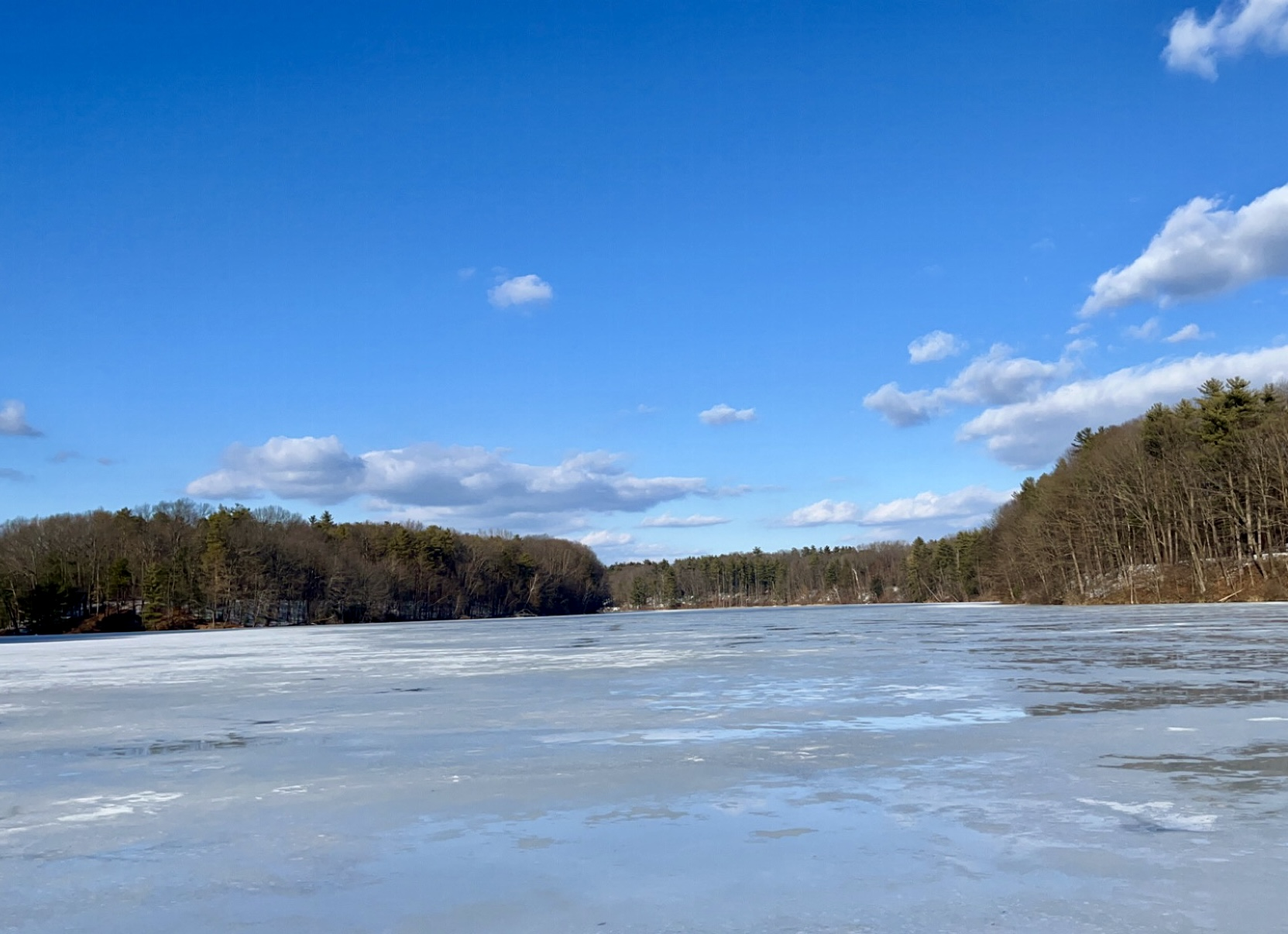
- Loughberry Lake in 2023

- Location within New York Location within the United States Location within North America
- Location: Saratoga Springs, NY
- Coordinates: 43.097°N 73.76°W
- Type: Dammed Reservoir
- Part of: Saratoga Lake Watershed
- Primary outflows: Spring Run
- Built: 1871
- Max. length: 5,207 feet (1.587 km)
- Max. width: 849 feet (0.259 km)
- Surface area: 76 acres (0.31 km^{2})
- Average depth: 11 feet (3.4 m)
- Water volume: 260,000,000 US gallons (980,000 m^{3})
- Surface elevation: 286 feet (87 m)

Loughberry Lake is a reservoir in the city of Saratoga Springs, New York. It is approximately 5,207 feet (1.59 km) long, about 849 feet (0.26 km) wide at its widest point, and has an average depth of about 11 feet (3.4 m).

The reservoir is located entirely within the city of Saratoga Springs. It has been the primary source of the city's drinking water since the late 19th century.

The dam is located at the southern end of the reservoir, with New York State Route 50 running along it.

== History ==
By 1868, the city of Saratoga Springs was growing exponentially in population, and a central, more reliable source of water was needed to support it. The Loughberry Stream was chosen by three commissioners of construction to be Saratoga Springs' main water source in 1870, after much deliberation between different political groups, who favored Lake Desolation and Granite Lake as the city's water supply. The reservoir was completed in 1871, and has served as Saratoga Springs' main water supply ever since.

== Fishing and recreation ==
For the general population, fishing and recreational activities such as swimming and canoeing are prohibited in Loughberry Lake. The only private group that is permitted to use boats of any sort on the reservoir is the Environmental Science Department of Skidmore College.
