= New York State Route 397 =

State highway in Albany County, New York, US

New York State Route 397
- Map of Albany County in eastern New York with NY 397 highlighted in red

Route information
- Maintained by NYSDOT
- Length: 3.09 mi (4.97 km)
- Existed: 1930–present

Major junctions
- South end: NY 146 in Altamont
- North end: US 20 in Guilderland

Location
- Country: United States
- State: New York
- Counties: Albany

Highway system
- New York Highways; Interstate; US; State; Reference; Parkways
← NY 396	→ NY 398

New York State Route 397 (NY 397) is a short state highway in New York, running from the village of Altamont to the hamlet of Dunnsville within the town of Guilderland, in Albany County. NY 397 is a two-lane highway its entire length.

== Route description ==
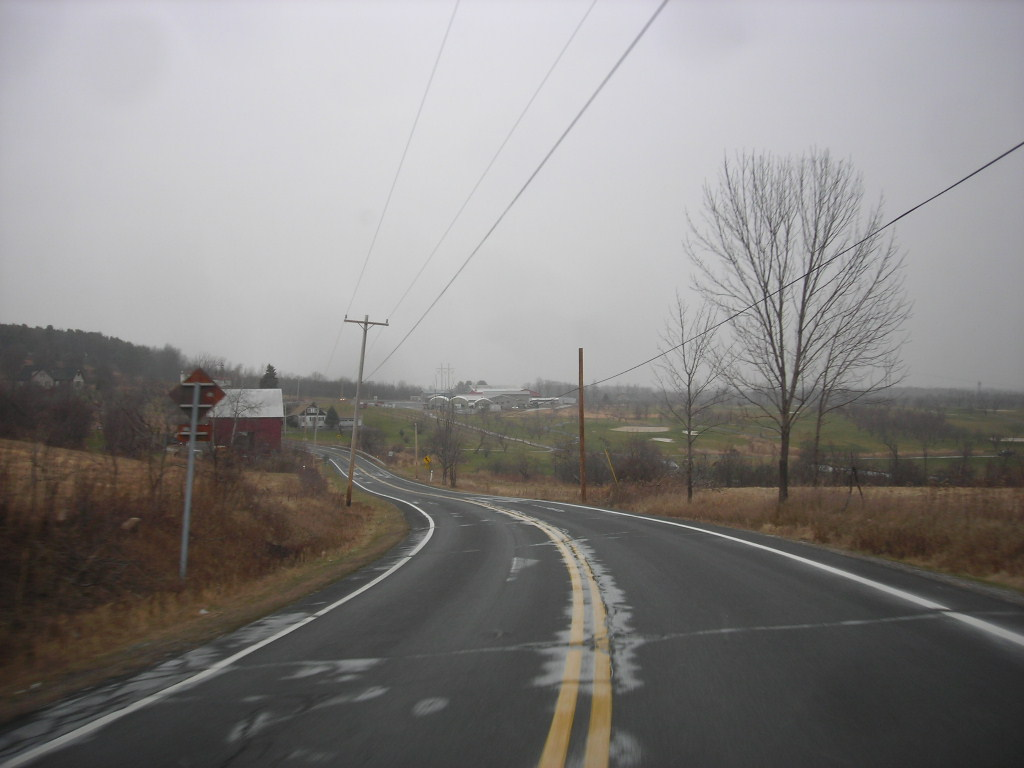
NY 397 in the town of Guiderland

NY 397 begins at an intersection with NY 146 (Western Avenue) and Maple Avenue (which connects to County Route 253) in the village of Altamont. It proceeds east along Western Avenue, which is a two-lane residential street, and then turns north at a junction with the Schoharie Plank Road. Retaining the Western Avenue name, NY 397 passes west of Bozenkill Park and crosses into the town of Guilderland. At the junction with Bozenkill Road, the route turns northeast, crossing over the Bozenkill Creek, where it changes names to Dunnsville Road. After the turn, NY 397 begins winding northeast through a small rural section of Albany County.

Running along the northwestern side of the Orchard Green Golf Course, the route passes the entrance near the junction with Becker Road. At this junction, NY 397 turns northward, winding past multiple homes before reaching the hamlet of Dunnsville. In Dunnsville, NY 397 reaches a junction with US 20 (Western Avenue), marking the northern end of NY 397. Dunnsville Road continues north towards the Schenectady County line and NY 406.

== History ==
A two-block portion of NY 397 through the village of Altamont follows a portion of the former Albany and Schoharie Plank Road, which represents a majority of current-day NY 146 and some of NY 443. The plank road, which was incorporated in 1849 and abandoned in 1866, ran from the village of Schoharie east to meet with the First Great Western Turnpike in the town of Guilderland.

NY 397 was assigned to its current alignment as part of the 1930 renumbering of state highways in New York and has not had any major changes since.

== Major intersections ==
The entire route is in Albany County.

Location	mi	km	Destinations	Notes
Altamont	0.00	0.00	NY 146 (Western Avenue)	Southern terminus
Guilderland	3.09	4.97	US 20 (Western Avenue) – Duanesburg, Albany	Northern terminus; hamlet of Dunnsville
1.000 mi = 1.609 km; 1.000 km = 0.621 mi
