= Balltown Road, New York =

Balltown Road is a street of some 10 miles (16 km), running almost exactly N-S, that follows parts of:

- New York State Route 146, crossing the Mohawk River at the Aqueduct Bridge
- New York State Route 914T (not marked)

The road begins in Schenectady County and enters Saratoga County when it crosses the Mohawk.
