= New York State Route 236 =

State highway in Saratoga County, New York, US

New York State Route 236
- Map of Saratoga County in eastern New York with NY 236 highlighted in red

Route information
- Maintained by NYSDOT
- Length: 2.50 mi (4.02 km)
- Existed: January 1, 1949–present

Major junctions
- South end: US 9 in Halfmoon
- North end: NY 146 in Halfmoon

Location
- Country: United States
- State: New York
- Counties: Saratoga

Highway system
- New York Highways; Interstate; US; State; Reference; Parkways
← NY 235	→ NY 237

New York State Route 236 (NY 236) is a north–south state highway located within the town of Halfmoon in Saratoga County, New York, in the United States. The highway is little more than a connector linking U.S. Route 9 (US 9) to NY 146 while bypassing the intersection of the two routes to the south and east. The southern terminus of NY 236 is at an intersection with US 9 and the northern terminus is at a junction with NY 146.

== Route description ==
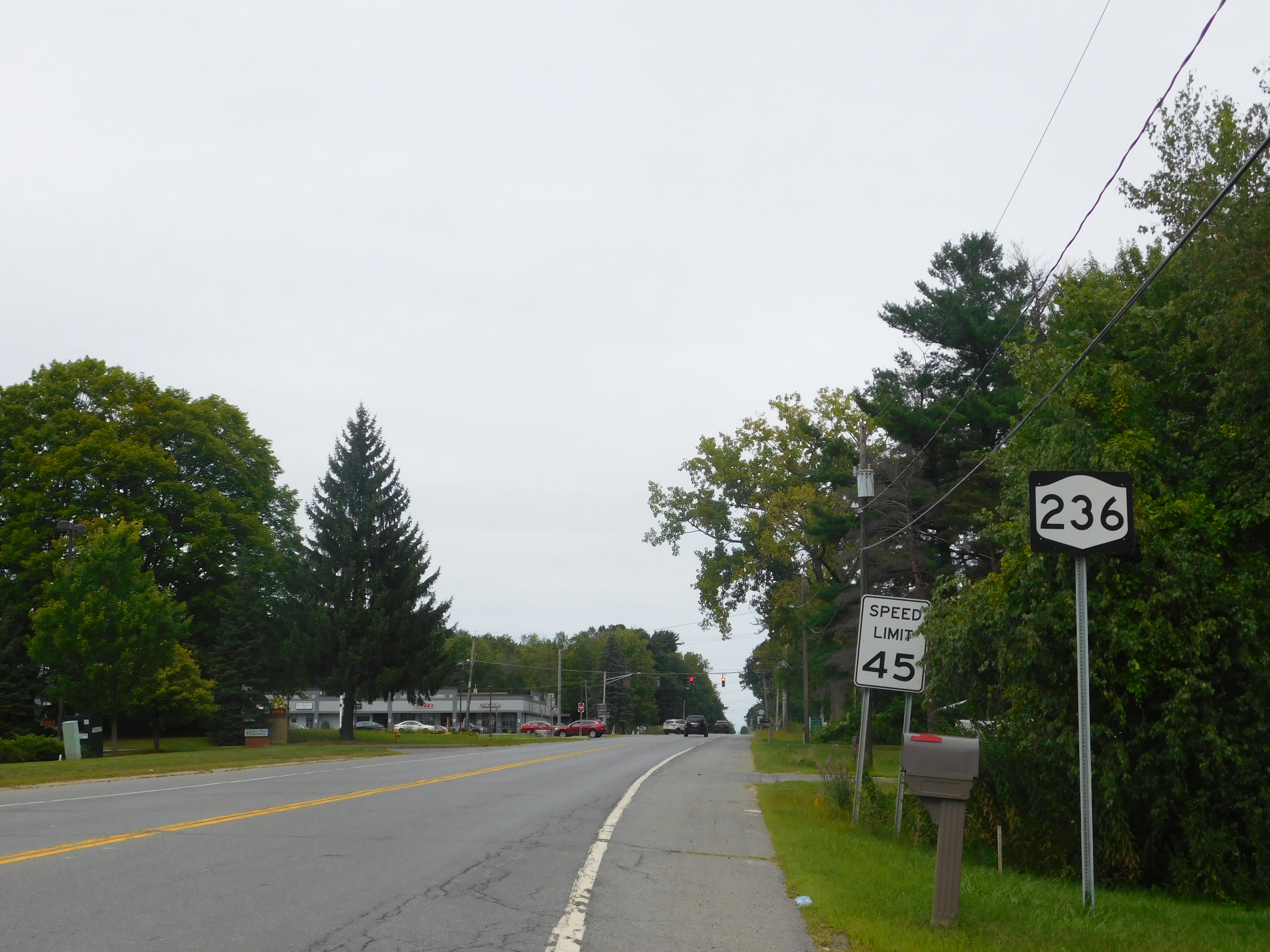
NY 236 north of US 9 in Halfmoon

NY 236 begins at an intersection with US 9 (Halfmoon Parkway) in the town of Halfmoon. The highway progresses northward, through the short commercial districts around Halfmoon, intersecting with County Route 94 (CR 94, named Guideboard Road). After Guideboard Road, NY 236 becomes more residentially developed, progressing to the northeast. North of downtown Halfmoon, the highway intersects with the western terminus of CR 95 (Harris Road) and passes to the west of Harris Park. The route turns northward and enters Newtown, where the NY 236 designation terminates at an intersection with NY 146.

== History ==
NY 236 was constructed by the state of New York in the late 1940s. The southern half of the route used a new highway constructed on a largely undeveloped right-of-way while the north half was built over a preexisting local road. Several curves in the original highway were eliminated as part of NY 236's construction. The NY 236 designation was assigned to the new road on January 1, 1949.

== Major intersections ==
The entire route is in Halfmoon, Saratoga County.

mi	km	Destinations	Notes
0.00	0.00	US 9 (Halfmoon Parkway) – Albany, Saratoga Springs	Southern terminus
2.50	4.02	NY 146 – Mechanicville, Clifton Park	Northern terminus; hamlet of Newtown
1.000 mi = 1.609 km; 1.000 km = 0.621 mi
