= Bridge 10, Erie Canal =

== History ==
Bridge 10
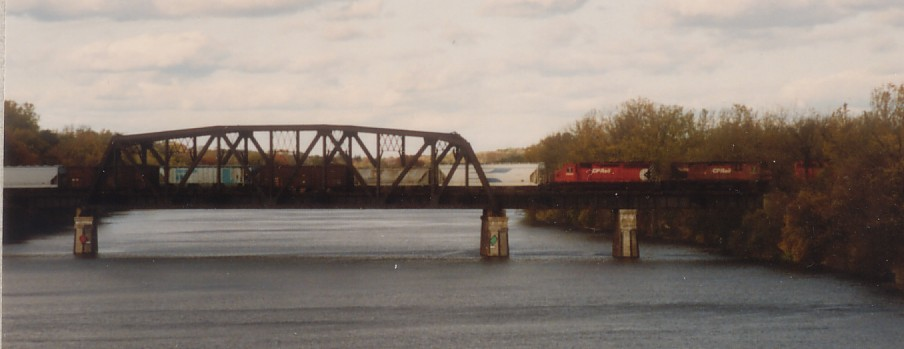
- Coordinates: 42°50′02″N 73°55′40″W
- Carries: railroad tracks
- Crosses: Erie Canal
- Locale: Schenectady, NY

Characteristics
- Design: Through truss, girder
- Material: Steel

Bridge 10 over the Erie Canal and Mohawk River in Schenectady. Bridge 10 is a railroad bridge used by the Canadian Pacific Railway. The rails on the bridge were realigned as part of a clearance project in the late 1990s. The double track was removed and replaced by a single set of rails in the center of the bridge. This was to allow the passage of very large steam turbine parts to be moved by rail from Schenectady's General Electric to the Port of Albany.

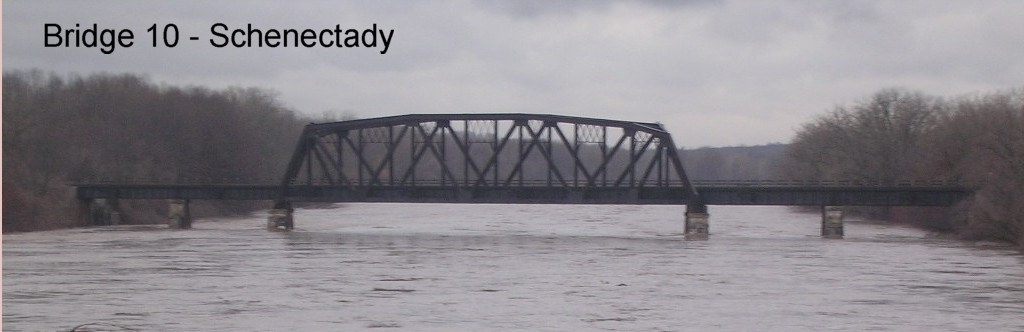

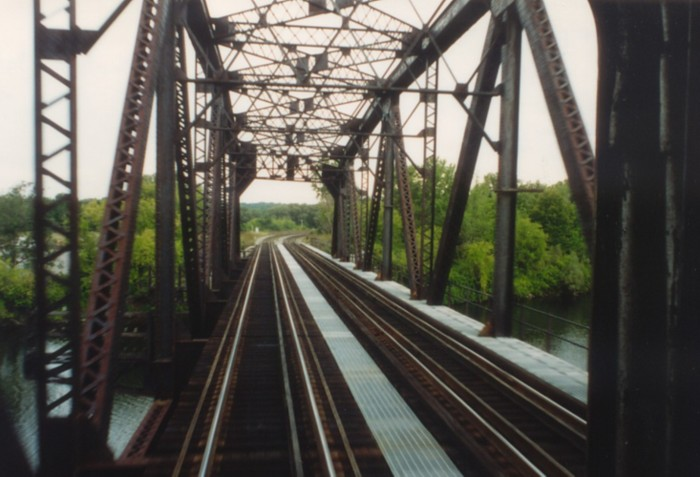
