= Crescent Bridge =

Bridge in United States of America

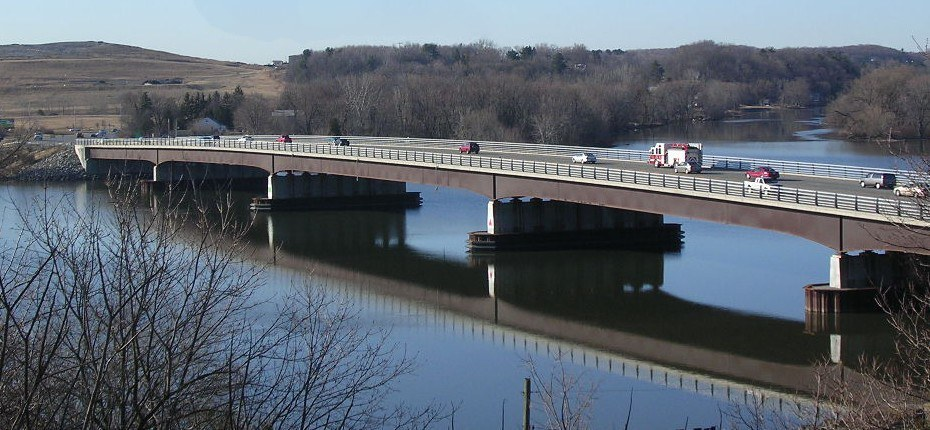
- Coordinates: 42°49′17.15″N 73°43′54.73″W
- Carries: US 9
- Crosses: Mohawk River
- Maintained by: NYSDOT

Characteristics
- Design: Bridge
- Total length: 1,229 ft (375 m)
- Width: 80 ft (24 m)
- Load limit: 79 tons (71.7 t)

History
- Construction end: 1996

Crescent Bridge (also known as the Bridge 6) is a 1,229-foot (375 m) bridge over the Mohawk River and the Erie Canal. It is in Crescent, New York, a hamlet in the town of Halfmoon in southern Saratoga County on the northern side of the Mohawk River. The Crescent Bridge carries U.S Route 9 over the Mohawk River between the towns of Colonie in Albany County and Halfmoon.

== History ==
The first crossing at Crescent was the Erie Canal Aqueduct which carried the canal over the river. The "Clinton's Ditch" aqueduct was a wooden structure supported by twelve stone piers. It served from the canal's opening in 1825 until 1842. Before the aqueduct was built people and goods were ferried across the river at the nearby Dunsbach Ferry and Forts Ferry.

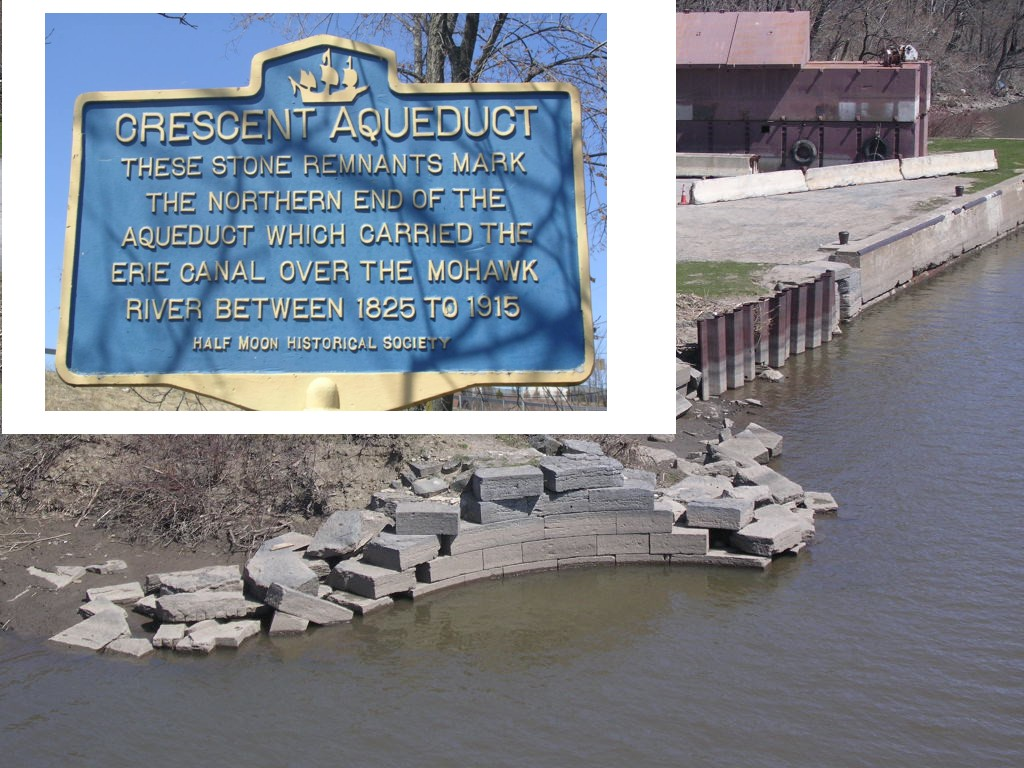
All that's left of the Crescent Aqueduct.

The Crescent aqueduct was one of two that crossed the Mohawk River, the other was at Rexford. The one in Crescent was called the Lower Mohawk Aqueduct, and the one at Rexford was the Upper Mohawk Aqueduct. When the Erie Canal was widened in 1842 a second larger Crescent aqueduct was built beside the first one. Afterwards the piers of the 1825 aqueduct were used to support a plank road at one point and later an iron toll bridge. The Lower Mohawk Aqueduct of 1842 was 1,137 feet (347 m) in length, 40.5 feet (12.3 m) wide (interior width) and had 26 stone arch spans. It stood for 73 years until the New State Barge Canal system opened in 1915. It was the longest aqueduct in the state.

When the State Barge Canal replaced the Erie Canal a new five-span truss bridge was built across the river (1914) and the 1842 aqueduct and the iron toll bridge were dismantled to clear the river for the passage of barge traffic. There are only a few cut stone remnants of the abutments on both the north and south banks of the Mohawk River which mark the opposite ends of the aqueduct.

In the 1950s a steel girder bridge was built to replace the truss bridge. This multi-girder bridge was replaced in 1996 with a new steel girder bridge.
