= Corinth (village), New York =

Corinth
- Village
- Village of Corinth
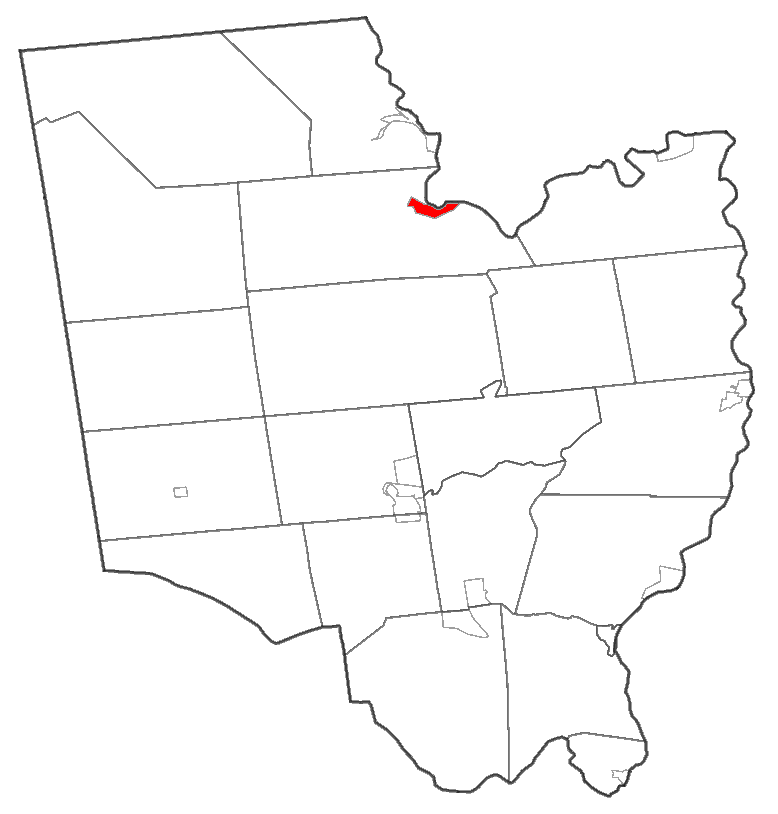
- Map highlighting Corinth's location within Saratoga County.

- Location within the state of New York
- Coordinates: 43°14′37″N 73°49′44″W
- Country: United States
- State: New York
- County: Saratoga
- Incorporation (village): 1888

Area
  - Total: 1.10 sq mi (2.86 km^{2})
  - Land: 1.07 sq mi (2.76 km^{2})
  - Water: 0.039 sq mi (0.10 km^{2})
- Elevation: 610 ft (186 m)

Population (2020)
  - Total: 2,562
  - Density: 2,401.9/sq mi (927.39/km^{2})
- Time zone: UTC-5 (Eastern (EST))
  - Summer (DST): UTC-4 (EDT)
- ZIP code: 12822
- Area code: 518
- FIPS code: 36-18212
- GNIS feature ID: 0974277
- Website: Village of Corinth

Corinth (/ˈkɒrɪnθ/ KORR-inth) is a village in Saratoga County, New York, United States. The population was 2,562 at the 2020 census. The village takes its name from the Greek city of Corinth.

The Village of Corinth is by the eastern town line of the Town of Corinth. The community asserts that it is the "Snowshoe capital of the world."

== History ==
Waterfalls, a source of power, attracted settlers to the area at the end of the 18th Century.

The village was incorporated in 1888. During that period, the village was the site of many paper mills.

== Geography ==
Corinth is located at 43°14′37″N 73°49′44″W (43.24375, -73.828944).

According to the United States Census Bureau, the village has a total area of 1.1 square miles (2.9 km^{2}), of which 1.1 square miles (2.8 km^{2}) is land and 0.04 square mile (0.1 km^{2}) (3.60%) is water.

The village is next to the Hudson River.

New York State Route 9N (Maple Street/Saratoga Avenue) intersects Palmer Avenue (which becomes County Road 24 outside the village) in the village.

== Demographics ==
Historical population
Census	Pop.	Note	%±
1880	510		—
1890	1,222		139.6%
1900	2,039		66.9%
1910	2,166		6.2%
1920	2,576		18.9%
1930	2,613		1.4%
1940	3,054		16.9%
1950	3,161		3.5%
1960	3,193		1.0%
1970	3,267		2.3%
1980	2,702		−17.3%
1990	2,760		2.1%
2000	2,474		−10.4%
2010	2,559		3.4%
2020	2,562		0.1%
U.S. Decennial Census

As of the census of 2000, there were 2,474 people, 1,024 households, and 653 families residing in the village. The population density was 2,318.6 inhabitants per square mile (895.2/km^{2}). There were 1,144 housing units at an average density of 1,072.2 per square mile (414.0/km^{2}). The racial makeup of the village was 98.10% White, 0.28% Black or African American, 0.08% Native American, 0.32% Asian, 0.24% Pacific Islander, 0.49% from other races, and 0.49% from two or more races. Hispanic or Latino of any race were 1.17% of the population.

There were 1,024 households, out of which 30.5% had children under the age of 18 living with them, 47.3% were married couples living together, 12.4% had a female householder with no husband present, and 36.2% were non-families. 30.1% of all households were made up of individuals, and 17.8% had someone living alone who was 65 years of age or older. The average household size was 2.41 and the average family size was 2.97.

In the village, the population was spread out, with 26.1% under the age of 18, 7.8% from 18 to 24, 28.5% from 25 to 44, 20.5% from 45 to 64, and 17.1% who were 65 years of age or older. The median age was 37 years. For every 100 females, there were 93.0 males. For every 100 females age 18 and over, there were 86.3 males.

The median income for a household in the village was $30,539, and the median income for a family was $39,205. Males had a median income of $31,481 versus $26,163 for females. The per capita income for the village was $16,134. About 6.6% of families and 11.9% of the population were below the poverty line, including 13.3% of those under age 18 and 8.8% of those age 65 or over.
