= Halfmoon, New York =

Halfmoon
- Town
- Town of Halfmoon
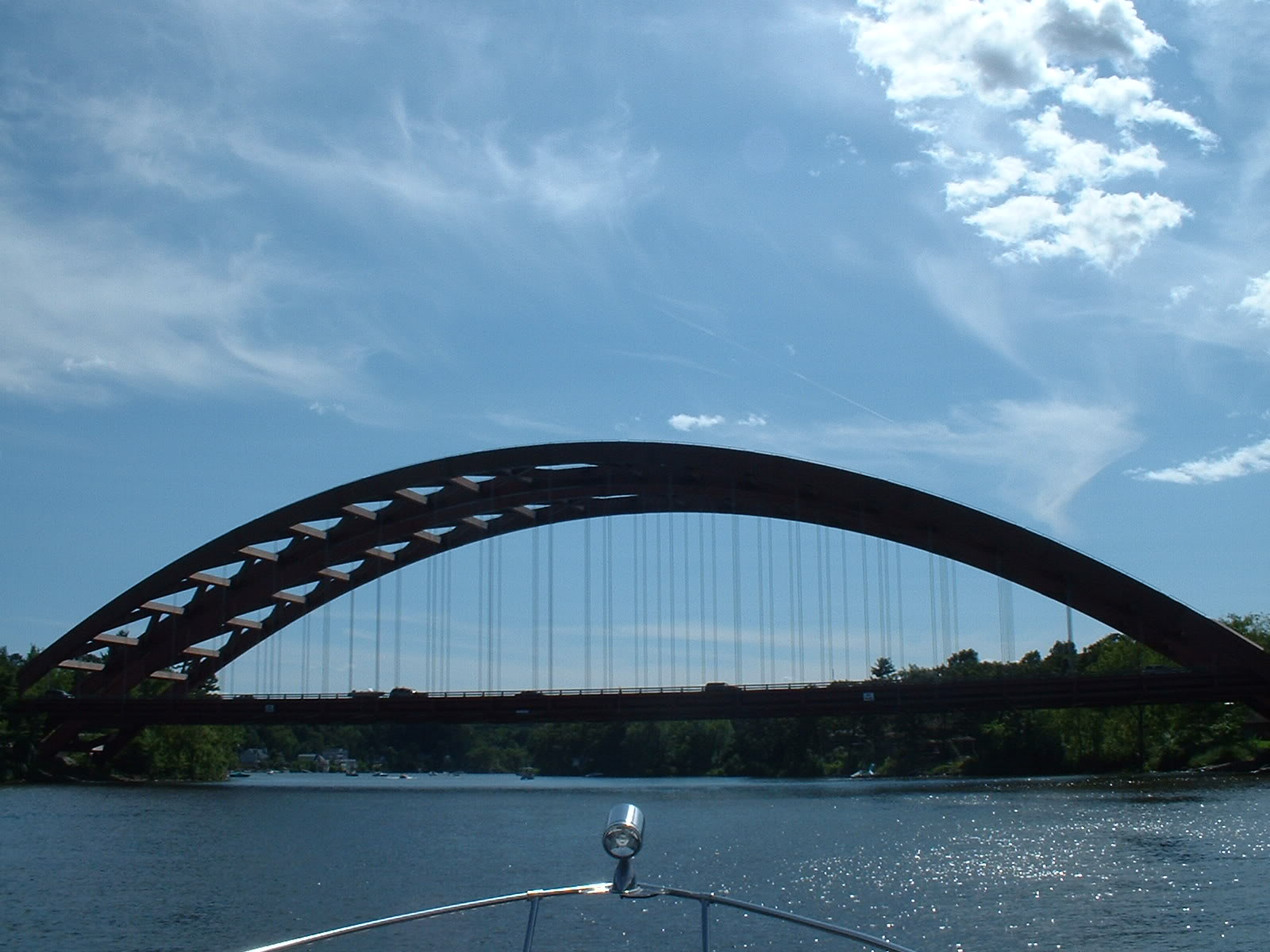
- The Thaddeus Kosciusko Bridge connects Halfmoon in Saratoga County to Colonie in Albany County, New York, over the Mohawk River.

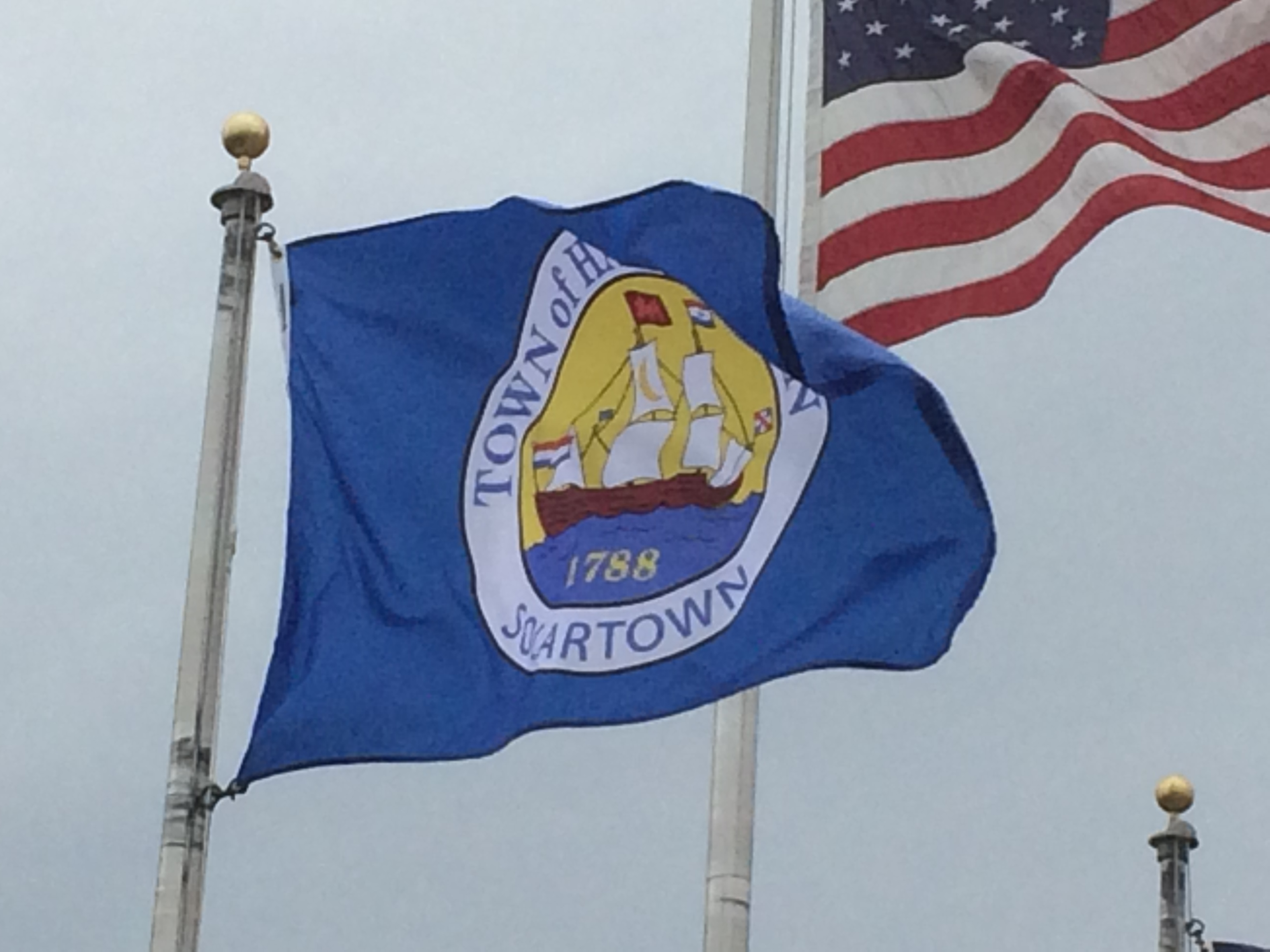
- Flag

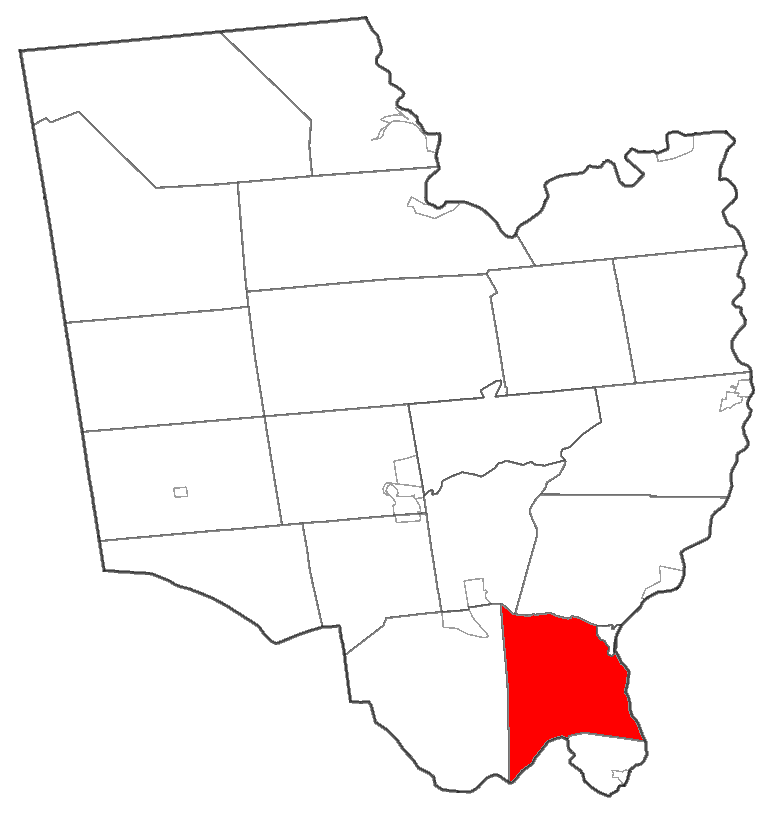
- Location within Saratoga County

- Location within the state of New York
- Coordinates: 42°51′24″N 73°44′33″W
- Country: United States
- State: New York
- County: Saratoga
- Settled: 1788
- Named for: Halve Maen

Government
  - Supervisor: Kevin Tollisen (R)

Area
  - Total: 33.63 sq mi (87.10 km^{2})
  - Land: 32.58 sq mi (84.38 km^{2})
  - Water: 1.05 sq mi (2.72 km^{2})
- Elevation: 282 ft (86 m)

Population (2020)
  - Total: 25,662
  - Density: 787.7/sq mi (304.12/km^{2})
- Time zone: UTC-5 (Eastern (EST))
  - Summer (DST): UTC-4 (EDT)
- ZIP code: 12065, 12188, and 12118
- Area code: 518
- FIPS code: 36-31489
- GNIS feature ID: 0979035
- Website: Town website

Halfmoon is a town in Saratoga County, New York, United States. The population was 25,662 at the 2020 census. The town is named for the shape of the lower elevation land north of the junction of the Hudson and Mohawk Rivers. It is also said to be named for Henry Hudson's ship, the Halve Maen.

Halfmoon is in the southeastern part of the county and is north of Albany.

== History ==
=== Pre-contact ===
Throughout the Late Archaic and Woodland Periods, Halfmoon was home to different groups of nomadic hunter-gatherers. Many of these groups gathered along bodies of water, such as the Hudson River, Mohawk River, and McDonald Creek. Evidence suggests that indigenous peoples participated in short-lived, overlapping activities around flowing bodies of water, and that said bodies of water were a viable resource to the local groups. However, there is no evidence to suggest that what would become Halfmoon was part of a larger pattern of settlement by indigenous peoples during these periods. By the time of European Contact, the land was occupied by the Mohican tribe.

=== European Contact & 17th Century ===
Earliest settlements of Halfmoon began with the arrival of the Dutch. The area now known as Halfmoon was a tract of land called "Halve Maen", which was named for the shape of the west side of the Hudson River to the north of its confluence with the Mohawk River. The Mohican tribe sold the plain to Philip Schuyler and Goosen Van Schaick in 1664, and it was later confirmed in Albany in 1667.

The original Half Moon Patent extended along the western bank of the Hudson River from Tenendahowa (modern-day Anthony Kill) to the Mohawk River. The first dwellings were said to have been established by the 1680s in the area of the current boundary between the Town of Halfmoon and Town of Waterford on the Hudson River.

=== 18th Century ===
The town was formed while still part of Albany County in 1788.

=== 19th Century ===
The name was briefly changed to Orange when the town of Waterford was created in 1816 from part of Halfmoon; however, the current name was restored in 1820. In 1828, the western portion of the town was used to create the town of Clifton Park.

By 1866, the Town of Halfmoon had four post offices, two Toll Houses, mutliple stone quarries, and over 15 individual schoolhouses.

==== Erie & Champlain Canals ====
The Town of Halfmoon being located between both the Hudson River and Mohawk River lent itself well to being the site of two of New York's canals: the Erie Canal and the Champlain Canal.

===== Erie Canal =====
The Erie Canal took a route up through the Village of Crescent and along the northern bank of the Mohawk River until continuing on into the Town of Clifton Park. At Crescent, numerous businesses and homes sprung up as the Erie Canal brought ships through the area. Notable businesses included Crescent Iron Foundry, a sawmilll, gristmill, cement company and brickyards.

At Crescent, the Lower Mohawk Aqueduct stretched across the Mohawk River and enabled ships to transfer from the locks on the southern bank of the Mohawk River into the Hamlet of Crescent. This construction was finished in 1825 and was 1,137 feet in length, 40.5 feet in width, and had 26 stone arch spans. When the canal was widened in 1842, a second larger Crescent aqueduct was built besides the first one, with the 1825 aqueduct becoming a pedestrian bridge that later hosted an iron toll bridge.

===== Champlain Canal =====
The Champlain Canal ran through a low area along the Hudson River in parallel to a railroad line until curving northward into Mechanicville and continuing north to Stillwater. The canal opened along its entire length by 1823. Flynn's Lock was located where McDonald Creek flows into the Hudson River. By 1866, the Champlain Canal had two lockhouses and multiple locks.

=== 20th Century ===
In 1915, the City of Mechanicville split off to form its own city.

==== Filling of the Erie Canal ====
In 1962, the Town of Halfmoon decided to fill in the Erie Canal area between U.S. Route 9 and Halfmoon Beach for a length of about 1.5 miles in order to prevent accidental downings. The garbage hauling contract was originally given to a compay called Aetra, but this responsibility was trasnferred to Chiarello Landfill and Disposal, Inc. in May of 1967.

Waste types accepted at this landfill were primarily municipal solid waste. No documentation on hazardous or chemical wastes can be found. The United States Environmental Protection Agency estimates that the volume of waste disposed of at this site is 176,000 cubic yards.

In 1968, Supreme Court Justice M. Sweeney ordered the landfill to be closed and covered by the end of the year, but this was never completed. The Town was advised by the Glens Falls District Office of the U.S. Department of Health that "large sink holes have appeared in the site and large quantities of methane gas are being produced". Following this, an explosion of methane gas was recorded in 1970.

In May of 1980, the EPA indicated that possible contamination from heavy metals is occurring at the site. This includes excessive amounts of lead, chromium, cadmium, antimony, and zinc. Antimony levels from locations near Clamsteam Road and Crescent Boat Club also indicated antimony levels surpassing New York State standards.

As of February 1980, New York State Department of Environmental Conservation observed leachate at different sites around the canal, and that the canal was filled 4-8 feet above the original grade.

== Geography ==
According to the United States Census Bureau, the town has a total area of 33.7 square miles (87 km^{2}), of which 32.7 square miles (85 km^{2}) is land and 1.0 square mile (2.6 km^{2}) (3.00%) is water.

The southern town line, delineated by the Mohawk River, is the border of Albany County. The eastern town line, at the Hudson River, is the border of Rensselaer County. The northern town line is marked by the Anthony Kill, a tributary of the Hudson River. McDonald Creek runs through the center of the town and empties into the Hudson River.

Interstate 87, the Adirondack Northway, is a six-lane north–south freeway along the western edge of Halfmoon. U.S. Route 9 parallels the interstate farther to the east and crosses into the town from Albany County on the Crescent Bridge. New York State Route 146, an east–west highway, intersects US-9 at the hamlet of Clifton Park. U.S. Route 4 is a north–south highway in the eastern part of the town. New York State Route 236 is a short state highway linking NY-146 to US-9.

== Demographics ==
Historical population
| Census | Pop. | Note | %± |
|---|---|---|---|
| 1820 | 4,024 | | — |
| 1830 | 2,042 | | −49.3% |
| 1840 | 2,631 | | 28.8% |
| 1850 | 2,788 | | 6.0% |
| 1860 | 3,130 | | 12.3% |
| 1870 | 3,093 | | −1.2% |
| 1880 | 3,102 | | 0.3% |
| 1890 | 3,732 | | 20.3% |
| 1900 | 5,101 | | 36.7% |
| 1910 | 5,980 | | 17.2% |
| 1920 | 1,534 | | −74.3% |
| 1930 | 1,739 | | 13.4% |
| 1940 | 1,969 | | 13.2% |
| 1950 | 2,836 | | 44.0% |
| 1960 | 4,120 | | 45.3% |
| 1970 | 9,287 | | 125.4% |
| 1980 | 11,860 | | 27.7% |
| 1990 | 13,879 | | 17.0% |
| 2000 | 18,474 | | 33.1% |
| 2010 | 21,535 | | 16.6% |
| 2020 | 25,662 | | 19.2% |
U.S. Decennial Census

As of the census of 2000, there were 18,474 people, 7,778 households, and 4,861 families residing in the town. The population density was 565.9 inhabitants per square mile (218.5/km^{2}). There were 8,172 housing units at an average density of 250.3 per square mile (96.6/km^{2}). The racial makeup of the town was 94.94% White, 1.27% African American, 0.17% Native American, 1.89% Asian, 0.02% Pacific Islander, 0.41% from other races, and 1.30% from two or more races. Hispanic or Latino of any race were 1.65% of the population.

There were 7,778 households, out of which 30.3% had children under the age of 18 living with them, 49.9% were married couples living together, 9.0% had a female householder with no husband present, and 37.5% were non-families. 29.1% of all households were made up of individuals, and 7.1% had someone living alone who was 65 years of age or older. The average household size was 2.35 and the average family size was 2.93.

In the town, the population was spread out, with 23.7% under the age of 18, 6.9% from 18 to 24, 36.3% from 25 to 44, 22.5% from 45 to 64, and 10.6% who were 65 years of age or older. The median age was 36 years. For every 100 females, there were 94.7 males. For every 100 females age 18 and over, there were 91.4 males.

The median income for a household in the town was $46,234, and the median income for a family was $53,515. Males had a median income of $40,076 versus $30,512 for females. The per capita income for the town was $23,714. About 3.7% of families and 4.5% of the population were below the poverty line, including 5.6% of those under age 18 and 6.4% of those age 65 or over.

== Notable people ==
- Chauncey Boughton, physician and New York State Assembly member
- Daniel G. Garnsey, former US Congressman

== Education ==
The Town of Halfmoon falls within three school districts:

- Mechanicville City School District
- Shenendehowa Central School District
- Waterford-Halfmoon Union Free School District

== Communities and locations in Halfmoon ==
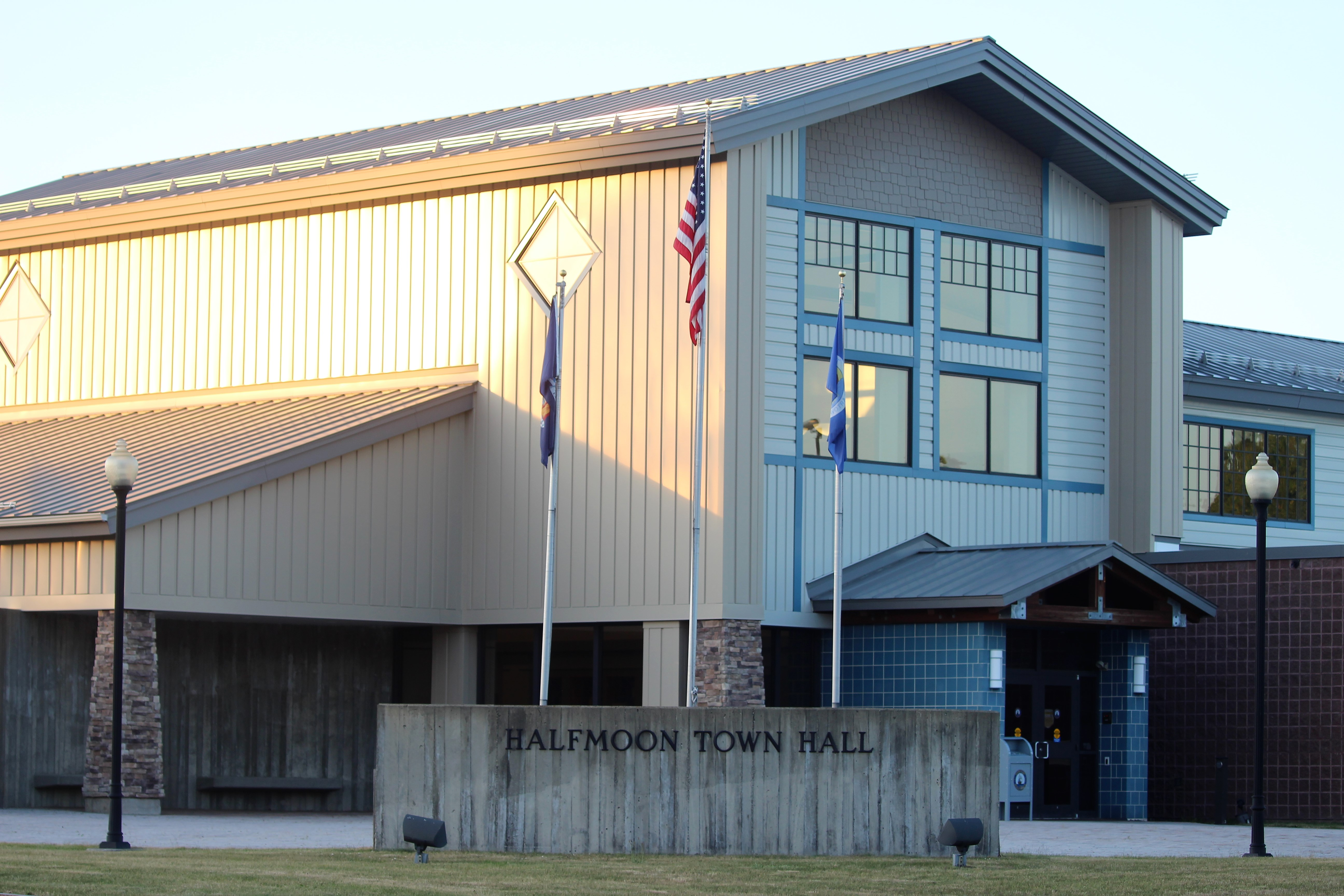
Halfmoon Town Hall

- Coons – A hamlet near the northern town line with Stillwater at the junction of Ushers Road, Cary Road, and Coons Crossing Road.
- Crescent – A hamlet in the southern part of the town where U.S. Route 9 crosses the Mohawk.
- Halfmoon (formerly “Middletown”) – The hamlet of Halfmoon is in the southern part of the town at the junction of County Roads 94, 95, 96, and 99.
- Halfmoon Beach – A riverbank hamlet in the southwestern corner of the town. The Hamlet is now almost entirely covered by a residential development called "Park Place on the Peninsula".
- Grays Corners – A location in the southwestern part of the town.
- Newtown – A hamlet in the northeastern part of the town at the intersection of State Route 236, State Route 146, and Saratoga County Route 86.
- Smithtown – A former community south of Newtown.
