= Ballston, New York =

Ballston
- Town
- Town of Ballston
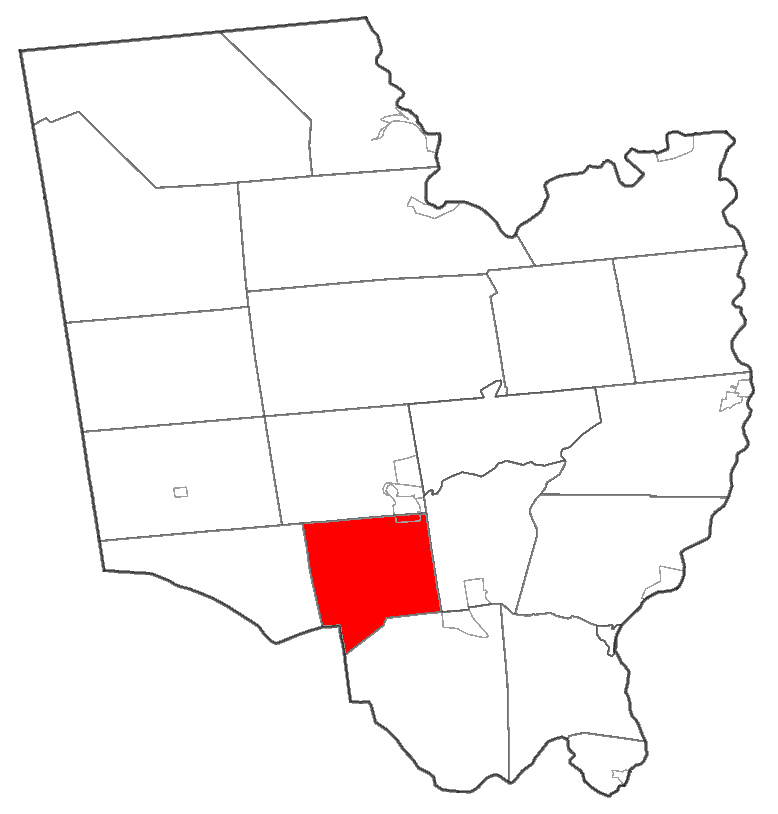
- Location within Saratoga County

- Location within the state of New York
- Coordinates: 42°57′12″N 73°52′29″W
- Country: United States
- State: New York
- County: Saratoga
- Named for: Eliphalet Ball

Area
  - Total: 30.04 sq mi (77.80 km^{2})
  - Land: 29.58 sq mi (76.60 km^{2})
  - Water: 0.46 sq mi (1.20 km^{2})
- Elevation: 404 ft (123 m)

Population (2020)
  - Total: 11,831
  - Density: 400.0/sq mi (154.45/km^{2})
- Time zone: UTC-5 (Eastern (EST))
  - Summer (DST): UTC-4 (EDT)
- ZIP code: 12019
- Area code: 518
- FIPS code: 36-04220
- GNIS feature ID: 0978707
- Website: Town website

Ballston is a town in Saratoga County, New York, United States. The population was 11,831 at the 2020 census. The name is derived from an early settler, Eliphalet Ball, a Presbyterian minister who relocated there from Westchester County, New York, in 1770. The town is in the southern part of the county, and is north of Schenectady.

== History ==
The region was first settled around 1763. In 1775, the area became a District in Albany County.

Early settlers in this area feared attacks from Mohawks, who already inhabited the region and who resented the establishment of European buildings on their sacred grounds. One of Ballston's historic sites is Indian Rock, a large boulder where Mohawk tribesmen reputedly took white captives (children, in some cases) to torture and kill them.

Ballston Lake, a narrow, 3.7-mile (6.0 km)-long lake with an unknown maximum depth in the south of the region, was called "Shanantaha" or "Sha-nen-da-ho-ra" by natives. It was known to early white settlers as Long Lake. The lake was part of the Mohawk River during the glacial age and archeological digs have unearthed artifacts indicating settlement around the lake as early as 3,500 BCE.

For a long time the depth of Ballston Lake was not determined, due to the multiple caves that prevented divers from going to the bottom. There has been an artifact found that is dated 2000 B.C.

=== Raid on Ballston ===
In 1780, Loyalist raiders attacked the northern part of the town and took several prisoners of war to Canada. The area was originally called "Ball's Town" and "Ballton." The town was formed in 1785 while still in Albany County. The original owners of the town were the Mcdonald brothers. Rev. Eliphalet Ball from Bedford, New York bought the area of land from them and called it Ball's Town. Ball also paid the brothers 1 barrel of rum for the right to name the town after himself. Over time the name was shortened to Ballston.

== Geography ==
According to the United States Census Bureau, the town has a total area of 30.0 square miles (78 km^{2}), of which 29.6 square miles (77 km^{2}) is land and 0.4 square miles (1.0 km^{2}) (1.33%) is water.

Ballston is bordered by the Town of Charlton to the west, Milton on the north, Malta on the east, and Clifton Park and a small portion of the Town of Glenville in Schenectady County on the south.

New York State Route 50 (Saratoga Road) is a north-south highway. New York State Route 67 is an east-west highway in the northeastern part of Ballston.

== Politics ==
Ballston's supervisor is Eric Connolly (R).

== Demographics ==
Historical population
Census	Pop.	Note	%±
1790	7,333		—
1800	2,099		−71.4%
1810	1,155		−45.0%
1820	2,407		108.4%
1830	2,113		−12.2%
1840	2,044		−3.3%
1850	2,269		11.0%
1860	2,234		−1.5%
1870	2,180		−2.4%
1880	2,035		−6.7%
1890	2,059		1.2%
1900	2,034		−1.2%
1910	2,091		2.8%
1920	2,206		5.5%
1930	2,578		16.9%
1940	2,630		2.0%
1950	3,969		50.9%
1960	5,752		44.9%
1970	6,720		16.8%
1980	7,714		14.8%
1990	8,078		4.7%
2000	8,729		8.1%
2010	9,776		12.0%
2020	11,831		21.0%
U.S. Decennial Census

As of the census of 2000, there were 8,729 people, 3,243 households, and 2,425 families residing in the town. The population density was 294.8 inhabitants per square mile (113.8/km^{2}). There were 3,388 housing units at an average density of 114.4 per square mile (44.2/km^{2}). The racial makeup of the town was 97.49% White, 0.52% African American, 0.23% Native American, 0.49% Asian, 0.01% Pacific Islander, 0.50% from other races, and 0.76% from two or more races. Hispanic or Latino of any race were 1.33% of the population.

There were 3,243 households, out of which 36.4% had children under the age of 18 living with them, 62.6% were married couples living together, 8.9% had a female householder with no husband present, and 25.2% were non-families. 21.2% of all households were made up of individuals, and 9.9% had someone living alone who was 65 years of age or older. The average household size was 2.59 and the average family size was 3.02.

In the town, the population was spread out, with 26.0% under the age of 18, 5.9% from 18 to 24, 27.7% from 25 to 44, 24.9% from 45 to 64, and 15.4% who were 65 years of age or older. The median age was 39 years. For every 100 females, there were 93.4 males. For every 100 females age 18 and over, there were 89.1 males.

The median income for a household in the town was $54,845, and the median income for a family was $61,709. Males had a median income of $44,365 versus $30,918 for females. The per capita income for the town was $24,206. About 3.1% of families and 4.6% of the population were below the poverty line, including 5.4% of those under age 18 and 5.9% of those age 65 or over.

As of the 2010 census there were 9,776 people. The racial makeup of the town was 96.1% White, 1.1% African-American, 0.2% Native American, 1.0% Asian. 1.9% were Hispanic or Latino.

== Communities and locations in the town of Ballston ==
- Ballston Center – a hamlet south of Ballston Spa on NY-50.
- Ballston Creek – the outlet of Ballston Lake, flowing past East Hills.
- Ballston Five Corners – an historic location south of Ballston Spa.
- Ballston Spa – the smaller, southern part of the village of Ballston Spa.
- Burnt Hills – a hamlet at the southwestern end of Ballston Lake on NY-50.
- Ballston Lake – a long, narrow lake in the southeastern part of the town.
- Ballston Lake – a hamlet at the southern end of the lake, partly in Ballston.
- East Hills – a hamlet on the eastern town line on NY-67.
- Garrison Manor – a location in the southern part of the town, west of Burnt Hills.

== Transportation ==
Interstate 87 and US Route 9 run north-south along the eastern edge of the town. NY Route 50 runs north-south through the town. NY Route 67 runs east-west through the town.

The Delaware and Hudson Railroad ran local passenger trains from Albany through Ballston Spa to Rouses Point (the last stop before the international border with Canada), in coordination with New York Central trains coming from Grand Central Terminal. The last local service to Rouses Point was between spring 1960 and spring 1961. The last local train making a stop in Ballston Spa was a local train terminating at Saratoga Springs, ending at some point between 1962 and 1963.

The Zim Smith Trail, a bicycle rail trail, runs from Ballston Spa southeast, through Round Lake, concluding at the western edge of Mechanicville. D&H trains used to take this path, for the route to Mechanicville.

== Sports ==
- Whites Beach Speedway (aka Raceway Park) was a 1/3-mile (0.54 km) high-banked dirt oval facility located on the western shore of the Ballston Lake. The oval operated from 1949 through 1962 and featured stock car racing sanctioned at different times by the Upstate Racing Association, the Eastern Stock Car Drivers Association, and NASCAR. (Note: Geolocation of Whites Beach Speedway: 42.9406°N 73.8659°W)
