= Hadley Mountain =

Mountain in New York, United States

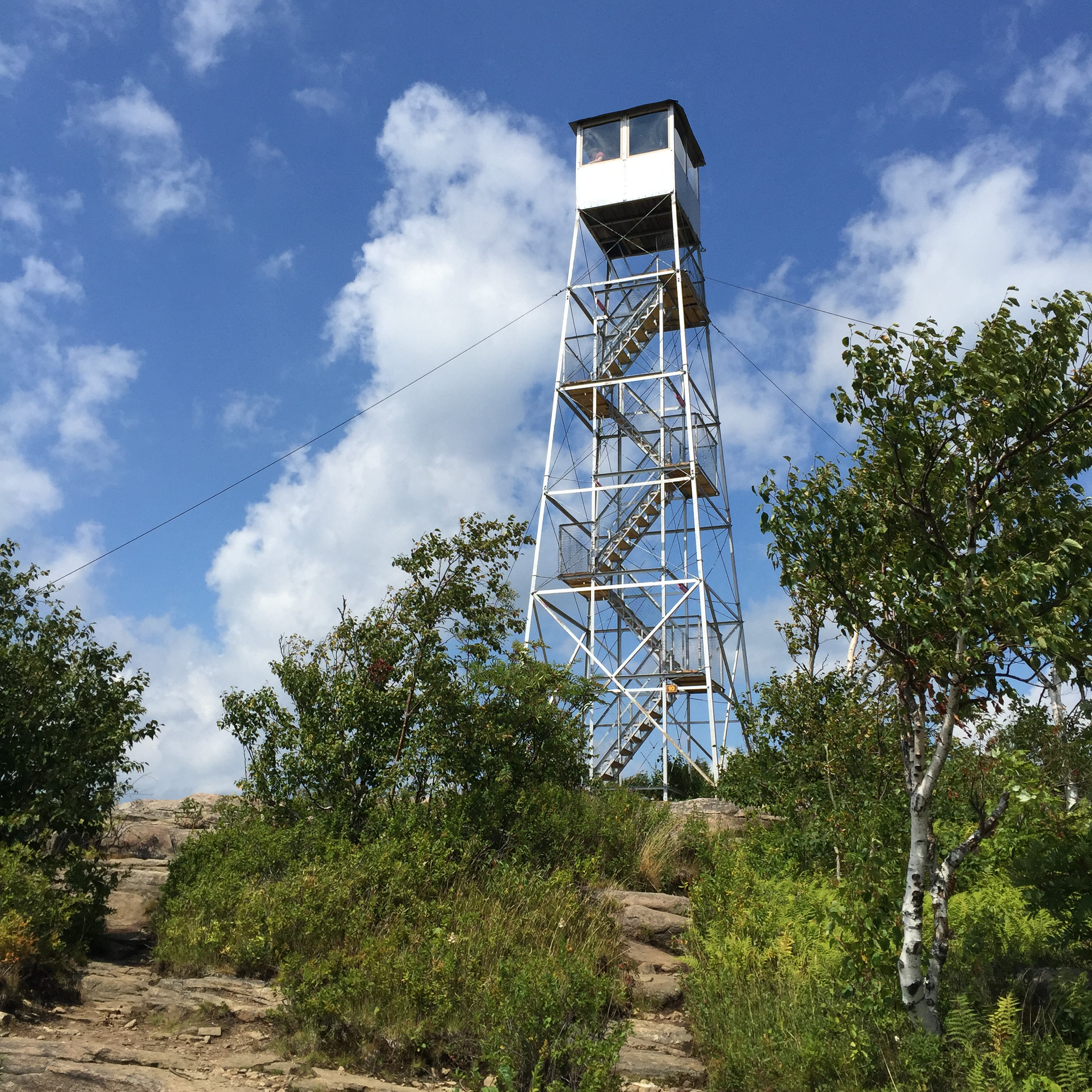
- Fire tower at the summit of Hadley Mountain

Highest point
- Elevation: 2,651 ft (808 m)
- Coordinates: 43°22′52″N 73°58′08″W

Geography
- Location within New York Adirondack Park Location within the United States
- Location: Saratoga County, New York, U.S.
- Parent range: Adirondack Mountains
- Topo map(s): USGS Stony Creek Quadrangle (summit), Conklingville Quadrangle (trailhead)

Hadley Mountain is a mountain located in the southern Adirondacks in the U.S. state of New York and is the second-highest peak in Saratoga County after neighboring Tenant Mountain. The Hadley Mountain Fire Observation Station was listed on the National Register of Historic Places on September 23, 2001 for its role as a Fire lookout tower with the New York State Forest Preserve. Hadley Mountain is the highest of the three peaks that form the West Mountain ridge.

== Location ==
Located in the Town of Hadley, Saratoga County, New York, the trailhead parking area is located approximately 1.5 miles along Tower Road, which off branches from Hadley Hill Road. Trailhead parking can accommodate 10-15 vehicles. The trailhead coordinates are: 43.37386, -73.95063.

== Route ==
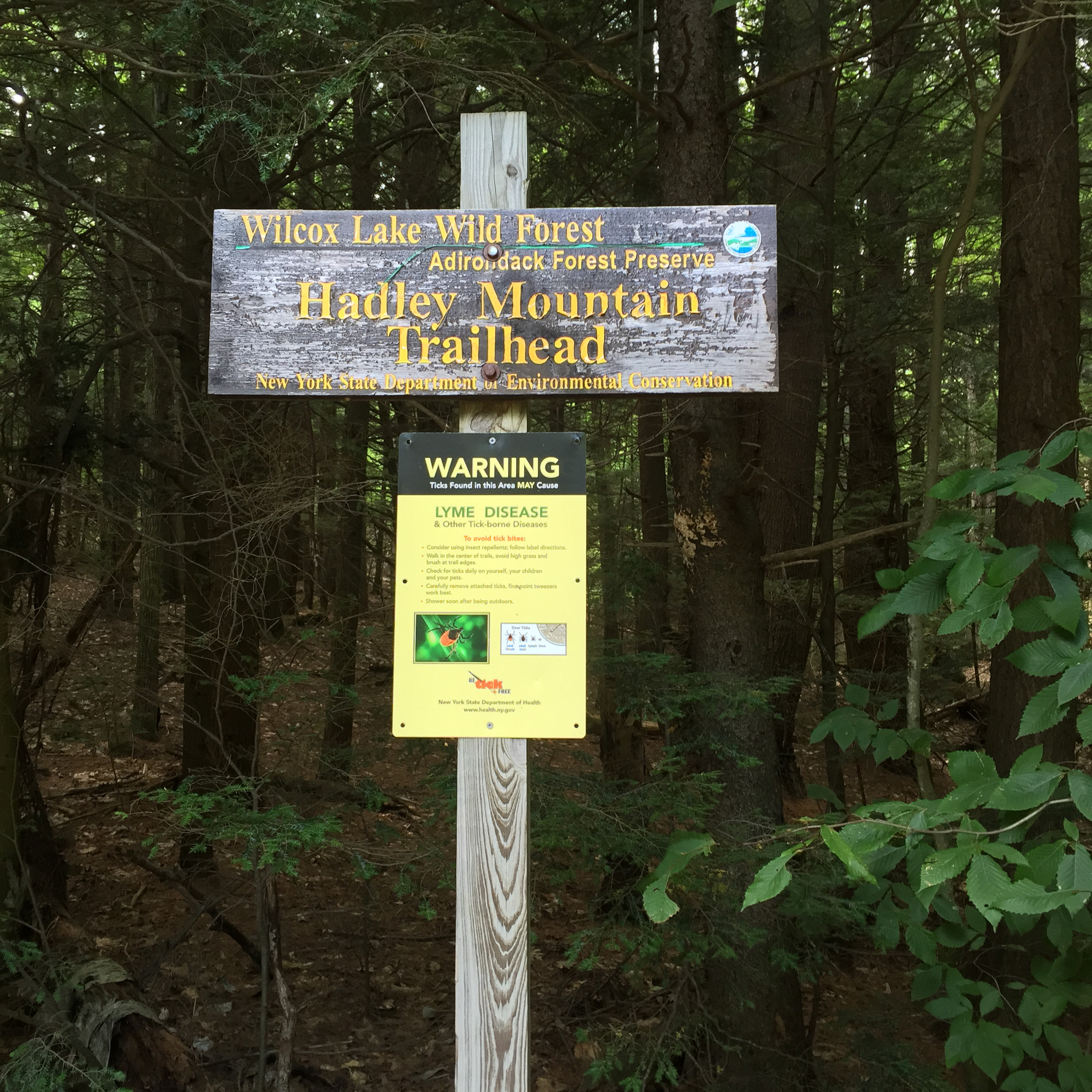
Sign at trail head

Hadley Mountain is a popular hike which, though short in distance at 1.8 miles (2.9 km), achieves a sharp elevation gain of 1,525 feet (465 m). The summit offers outstanding views of the Southern Adirondack Mountains and especially the Great Sacandaga Lake. The only trail begins from the trailhead parking area next to an Historic Marker and begins an immediate climb. The hiking register is reached within a couple of dozen yards of leaving the trailhead. A moderate climb following red trail markers leads through woodland on a mostly bedrock trail. Crossing back and forth over a small creek (dry in summer), the trail continues steeply past interesting boulders and cliffs to a level shoulder at about 1 mile (1.6 km). Following this brief gentle section the trail steepens and continues mostly on bedrock to the summit. Outstanding panoramas can be viewed from clearings along the final .8 miles (1.3 km) to the summit, and from the summit itself.

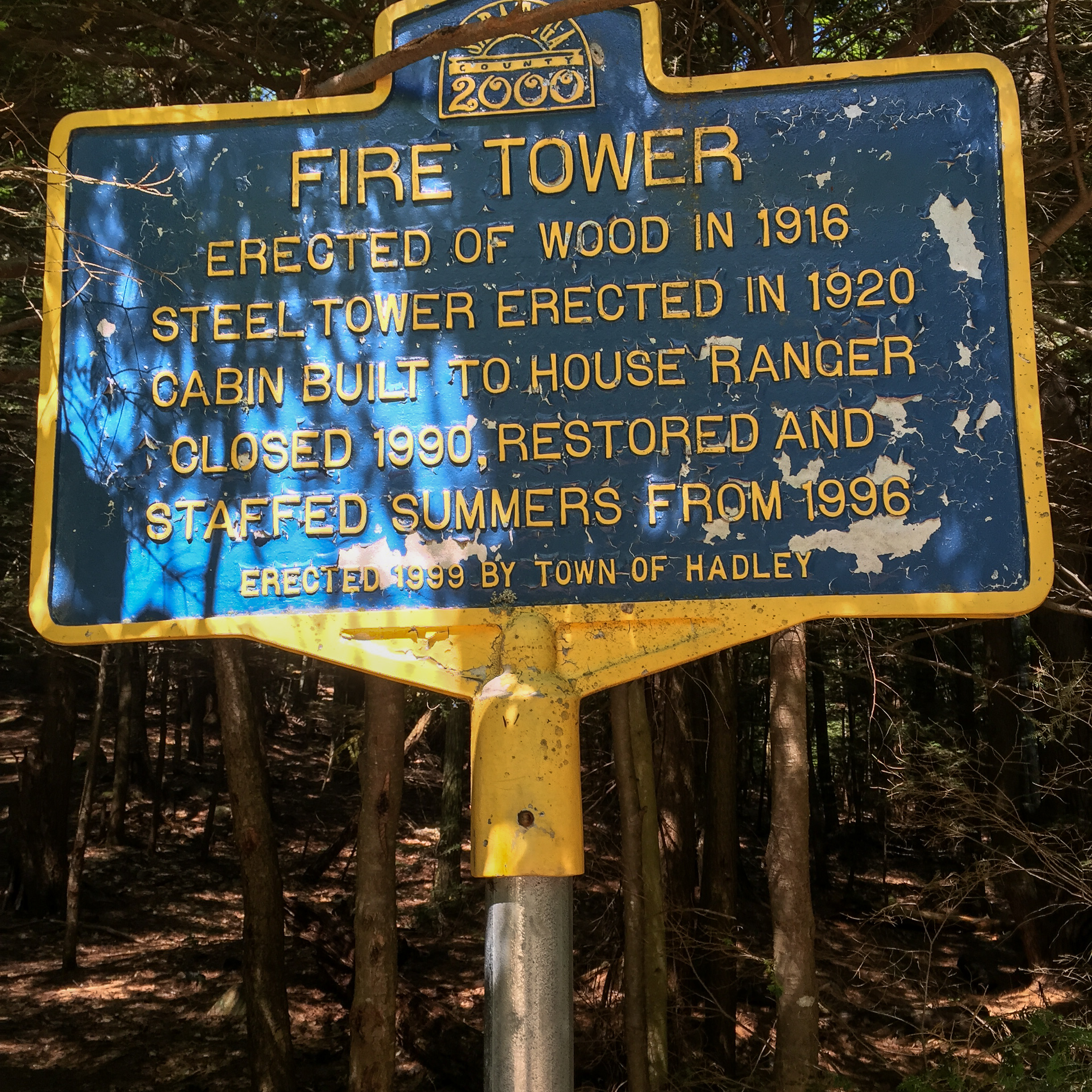
The Plaque

At the summit, a firetower affords a commanding 360 degree panorama, taking in Great Sacandaga Lake, the surrounding southern Adirondacks and the High Peaks of the Adirondacks.

The summit of Roundtop Mountain may be reached via a 0.8 miles (1.3 km) bushwhack from the summit of Hadley Mountain by heading NNE. In Winter this is a popular snowshoe trail due to access and length of trail to summit.

== History ==
Significant fires in the early 1900s resulted in the first fire tower being built in 1916. This wooden tower was replaced with a steel tower in either 1917 or 1920, followed by a staffed cabin for a ranger. The tower was decommissioned in 1990 as the forest service shifted to a combination of aerial surveillance and reporting by local citizens. The tower was restored by volunteers in 1996, and may be staffed in summer months by a steward who will answer questions from hikers. A historical marker was added to the site in 1999 detailing a brief history of the tower.
