= Stony Creek, New York =

Stony Creek
- Town
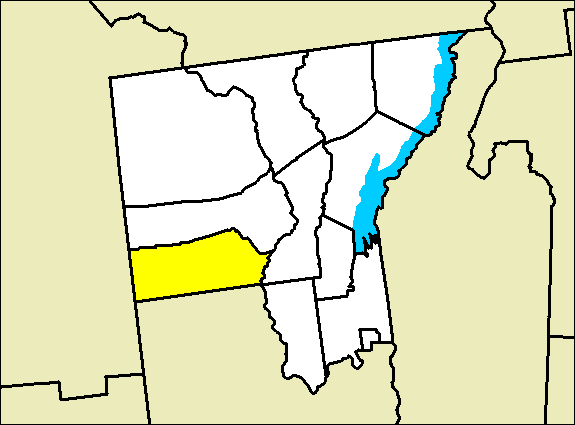
- Location of Stony Creek in Warren County

- Location within the state of New York
- Coordinates: 43°25′36″N 73°57′42″W
- Country: United States
- State: New York
- County: Warren

Area
  - Total: 83.21 sq mi (215.50 km^{2})
  - Land: 82.16 sq mi (212.80 km^{2})
  - Water: 1.04 sq mi (2.70 km^{2})
- Elevation: 2,418 ft (737 m)

Population (2010)
  - Total: 767
  - Estimate (2016): 747
  - Density: 9.1/sq mi (3.51/km^{2})
- Time zone: UTC-5 (Eastern (EST))
  - Summer (DST): UTC-4 (EDT)
- ZIP code: 12878
- Area code: 518
- FIPS code: 36-71641
- GNIS feature ID: 0979531
- Website: Town website

Stony Creek is a town in the southwestern part of Warren County, New York, United States. It is northwest of the city of Glens Falls and is part of the Glens Falls Metropolitan Statistical Area. The population was 767 at the 2010 census. The town is named for a creek that flows through it. Stony Creek is within the Adirondack Park.

== History ==
The town was first settled circa 1795. Stony Creek was established as a town in 1852 from a portion of the Town of Warrensburg called "Athol."

In the late 1800s and early 1900s, when a tannery existed at the confluence of Roaring Branch and Stony Creek near the center of town, the peak population of 1,250 was attained. During that time, extensive logging was done in western Stony Creek. Once many of the hemlock trees were taken out, and tanning practices changed, the tannery closed and Stony Creek's population decreased significantly and has remained at lower levels since then.

The center of town – referred to by residents as the "four corners" (where the roads from nearby towns Hadley and Warrensburg intersect and continue on to Wilcox Lake/Harrisburg and Lens Lake, both of which terminate at those destinations) – includes the main business and social area of town. The Stony Creek Inn, the Creek Center Mercantile and the Post Office now occupy three of the four corners and a small park adjacent at Roaring Branch occupies the fourth.

In addition to the four corners, the other main area of activity in Stony Creek is the John T. O'Neill Green Meadows Park (aka "rec field") which is situated just west of the four corners and along Stony Creek itself. The rec field includes a swimming hole (below a small low-head dam on Stony Creek), basketball court, softball diamond and backstop, a large pavilion under which every Tuesday night in July and August the town presents Music in the Park, playground and covered area with picnic tables.

The "rec" field is also the site of the long-running annual Mountain Festival. In the past, the original Mountain Days celebrated the 100th anniversary of the town and paid homage to the area's rich logging tradition, attracting thousands of attendees. It included competitions such as the greased pole climb (where competitors stood on each others' shoulders to get to the top of a debarked, greased pole where a $100 bill was nailed), chainsaw and bandsaw speed competitions, wood chopping competitions, axe throwing competitions, and greased pig chases. In recent years, Mountain Days, now called Mountain Festival, has become a more traditional and smaller festival, with music, food and activities for kids and stands selling various local arts and crafts. The festival continues to grow with added attractions each year.

The Methodist Episcopal Church was added to the National Register of Historic Places in 2010.

== Geography ==
According to the United States Census Bureau, the town has a total area of 83.2 square miles (215 km^{2}), of which 82.4 square miles (213 km^{2}) is land and 0.8 square miles (2.1 km^{2}) (1.01%) is water.

The southern town line is the border of Saratoga County. The eastern town boundary is marked by the Hudson River, and the western town line is the border of Hamilton County.

=== Adjacent towns and areas ===
The southern town line borders the towns of Day and Hadley in Saratoga County. The western town boundary is shared by the town of Wells in Hamilton County. To the north is the town of Thurman and the eastern town line is shared with the town of Warrensburg.

== Demographics ==
Historical population
Census	Pop.	Note	%±
1860	960		—
1870	1,127		17.4%
1880	1,253		11.2%
1890	1,342		7.1%
1900	1,019		−24.1%
1910	858		−15.8%
1920	651		−24.1%
1930	464		−28.7%
1940	457		−1.5%
1950	479		4.8%
1960	459		−4.2%
1970	560		22.0%
1980	528		−5.7%
1990	670		26.9%
2000	743		10.9%
2010	767		3.2%
2025 (est.)	750
U.S. Decennial Census

As of the census of 2000, there were 743 people, 297 households, and 204 families residing in the town. The population density was 9.0 inhabitants per square mile (3.5/km^{2}). There were 513 housing units at an average density of 6.2 per square mile (2.4/km^{2}). The racial makeup of the town was 97.31% White, 0.94% Native American, 0.54% Asian, 0.13% from other races, and 1.08% from two or more races. Hispanic or Latino of any race were 1.48% of the population.

There were 297 households, out of which 28.6% had children under the age of 18 living with them, 53.9% were married couples living together, 8.8% had a female householder with no husband present, and 31.0% were non-families. 25.9% of all households were made up of individuals, and 12.8% had someone living alone who was 65 years of age or older. The average household size was 2.46 and the average family size was 2.95.

In the town, the population was spread out, with 23.1% under the age of 18, 6.5% from 18 to 24, 28.7% from 25 to 44, 26.4% from 45 to 64, and 15.3% who were 65 years of age or older. The median age was 40 years. For every 100 females, there were 107.5 males. For every 100 females age 18 and over, there were 110.7 males.

The median income for a household in the town was $32,946, and the median income for a family was $36,111. Males had a median income of $28,393 versus $23,929 for females. The per capita income for the town was $14,654. About 10.4% of families and 16.3% of the population were below the poverty line, including 19.6% of those under age 18 and 8.5% of those age 65 or over.

== Communities and locations in Stony Creek ==
- Bakertown – A location in the western part of the town.
- Harrisburg – A hamlet in the southwestern part of the town, on Harrisburg Road and adjacent to Harrisburg Lake.
- Knowelhurst – A hamlet in the north-central part of the town on Harrisburg Road.
- New Lake – A lake located northwest of Harrisburg.
- Stony Creek – A hamlet in the southeastern part of the town on Harrisburg Road by a stream called Stony Creek.
- Wilcox Lake – A lake near the western town line.
