= Corinth, New York (disambiguation) =

Corinth is the name of three places in the state of New York:

- Corinth (town), New York, a town
- Corinth (village), New York, located in the Town of Corinth
- Corinth, New York, the default place name assigned by the United States Postal Service (USPS) for the area defined by the ZIP code 12822. This area encompasses the entire Village of Corinth, nearly all of the Town of Corinth, and parts of the towns of Day and Hadley.
