= Conklingville Dam =

Dam in Upstate New York

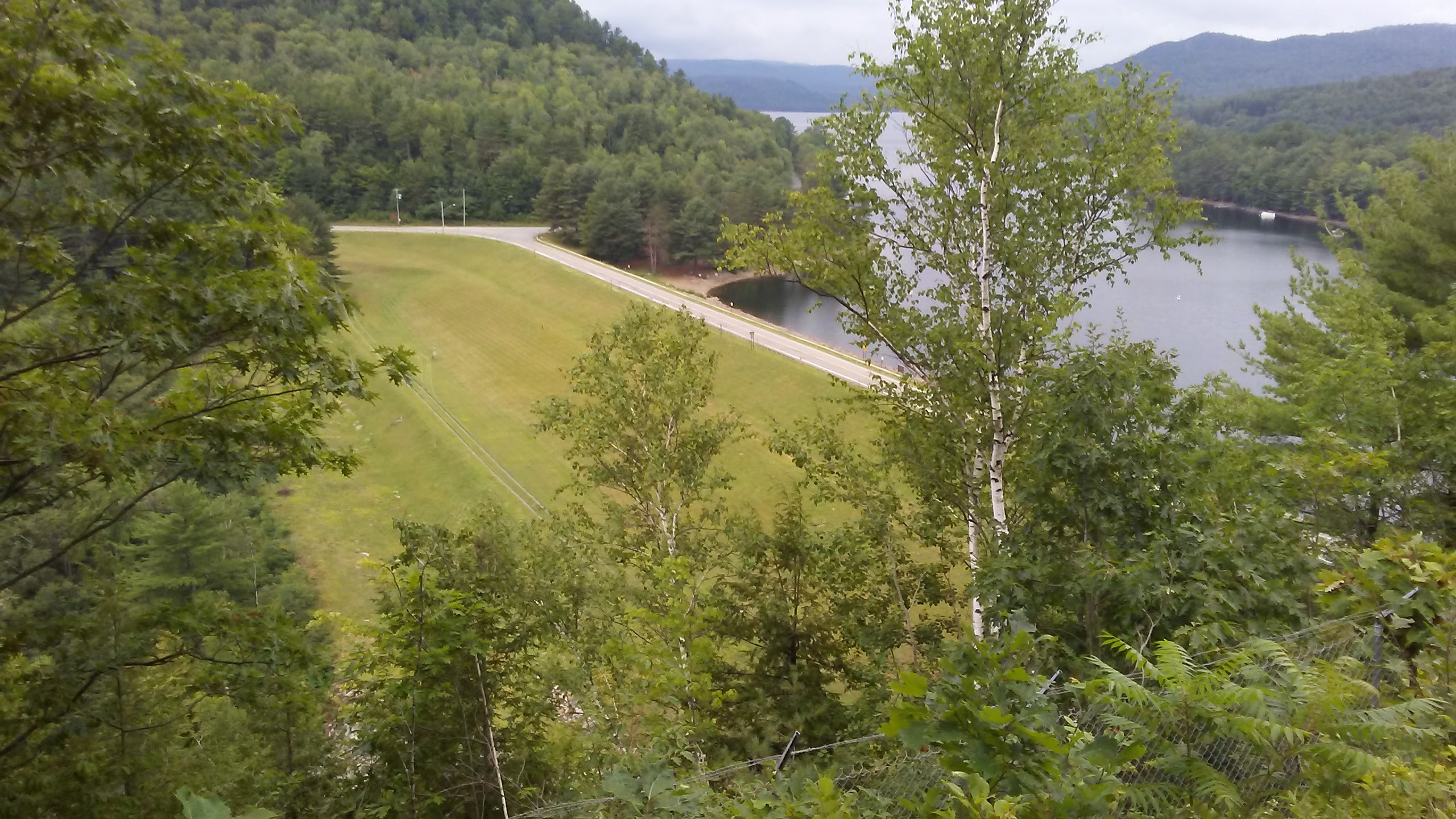
- A photo of the dam from County Route 7

- Location within New York Adirondack Park
- Country: United States
- Location: New York
- Coordinates: 43.3180°N 73.9234°W
- Purpose: Flood control
- Status: Operational
- Construction began: 1927
- Opening date: March 27, 1930
- Construction cost: $12 million
- Owner: Hudson River–Black River Regulating District

Dam and spillways
- Type of dam: Earth fill dam
- Impounds: Sacandaga River
- Height (foundation): 95 feet (29 m)

Reservoir
- Creates: Great Sacandaga Lake
- Total capacity: 29,920,000,000 cubic feet (847,000,000 m^{3})
- Catchment area: 1,044 square miles (2,700 km^{2})
- Surface area: 41.7 square miles (108 km^{2})
- Maximum length: 20 miles (32 km)
- Maximum width: 5 miles (8.0 km)

Power Station
- Installed capacity: 22 MW

The Conklingville Dam, in Hadley, Saratoga County, New York, is an earthen dam which holds back the Great Sacandaga Lake (in the town of Day, New York).

The dam, completed in 1930, is owned by the Hudson River–Black River Regulating District. It stands 95 feet high, impounds a maximum of 792,000 acre-feet; the lake has a perimeter of 129 miles (208 km), and an area of 42 square miles (11,000 ha). The hydroelectric plant is named for Elmer West, a builder of the Spier Falls Dam located downstream on the Hudson.

== History ==
At the end of the Wisconsin Glacial Episode a glacial moraine blocked the outflow of the Sacandaga River, forming "Glacial Lake Sacandaga". The rising water eventually found an outlet over a small divide at Conklingville. The outlet gradually eroded, draining the lake. The Conklingville dam was proposed to block this outlet, and nearly restore the configuration of the glacial lake.

The Sacandaga River was subject to periodic severe floods. A dam had been considered since the 1860s, both for flood control and, later, for power generation. In 1913 the "most disastrous [flood] in history" caused major damage to towns on the Hudson River below the Sacandaga: Albany, Green Island, Rensselaer, Troy, and Watervliet. In 1922 New York established the "Hudson River Regulating District" (now the "Hudson River–Black River Regulating District") "To regulate the flow of the Hudson and Sacandaga Rivers as required by the public welfare including health and safety." The financing was done through a combination of contributions from industries that would use the generated power (95.5%), and from the communities flooded in 1913. The dam was designed by Edward Haynes Sargent. The first bids were received in 1927. The project was projected to be completed in 1929, but various setbacks, including a flood that year, delayed completion until March 27, 1930. The cost of the dam was $12 million.

Residents of the valley opposed to the dam. The Fonda, Johnstown and Gloversville Railroad instituted a protracted lawsuit over the flooding of its tracks and finally won a judgement to $1.6 million.

== Uses ==
The primary purpose of the dam was flood control, and the water level on the lake is still carefully regulated to prevent flooding while maintaining adequate flow downstream on the Hudson. The secondary purpose was power generation. As of 2016 the dam generates 22 Megawatts. The third purpose was recreation. The Great Sacandaga Lake supports boating, fishing, swimming, and water sports. Many summer rentals of homes and boats are available.

== Climate ==
Climate data for Conklingville Dam, New York (1991-2020 normals)
Month	Jan	Feb	Mar	Apr	May	Jun	Jul	Aug	Sep	Oct	Nov	Dec	Year
Mean daily maximum °C (°F)	−1.9 (28.5)	−0.2 (31.7)	4.4 (40.0)	11.9 (53.4)	18.6 (65.5)	22.7 (72.8)	25.0 (77.0)	24.3 (75.8)	20.6 (69.0)	13.9 (57.0)	7.2 (45.0)	1.2 (34.1)	12.3 (54.2)
Daily mean °C (°F)	−6.5 (20.3)	−5.3 (22.5)	−0.6 (30.9)	6.5 (43.7)	13.2 (55.7)	17.8 (64.1)	20.4 (68.7)	19.6 (67.2)	15.5 (59.9)	9.2 (48.5)	3.2 (37.8)	−2.5 (27.5)	7.6 (45.6)
Mean daily minimum °C (°F)	−11.1 (12.0)	−10.4 (13.3)	−5.7 (21.7)	1.1 (33.9)	7.7 (45.9)	12.9 (55.3)	15.7 (60.3)	14.7 (58.5)	10.5 (50.9)	4.4 (40.0)	−0.8 (30.6)	−6.2 (20.8)	2.7 (36.9)
Average rainfall mm (inches)	88 (3.48)	73 (2.89)	92 (3.61)	98 (3.86)	100 (3.94)	120 (4.71)	107 (4.21)	96 (3.77)	82 (3.23)	114 (4.49)	88 (3.45)	103 (4.06)	1,161 (45.70)
