= Hadley Parabolic Bridge =

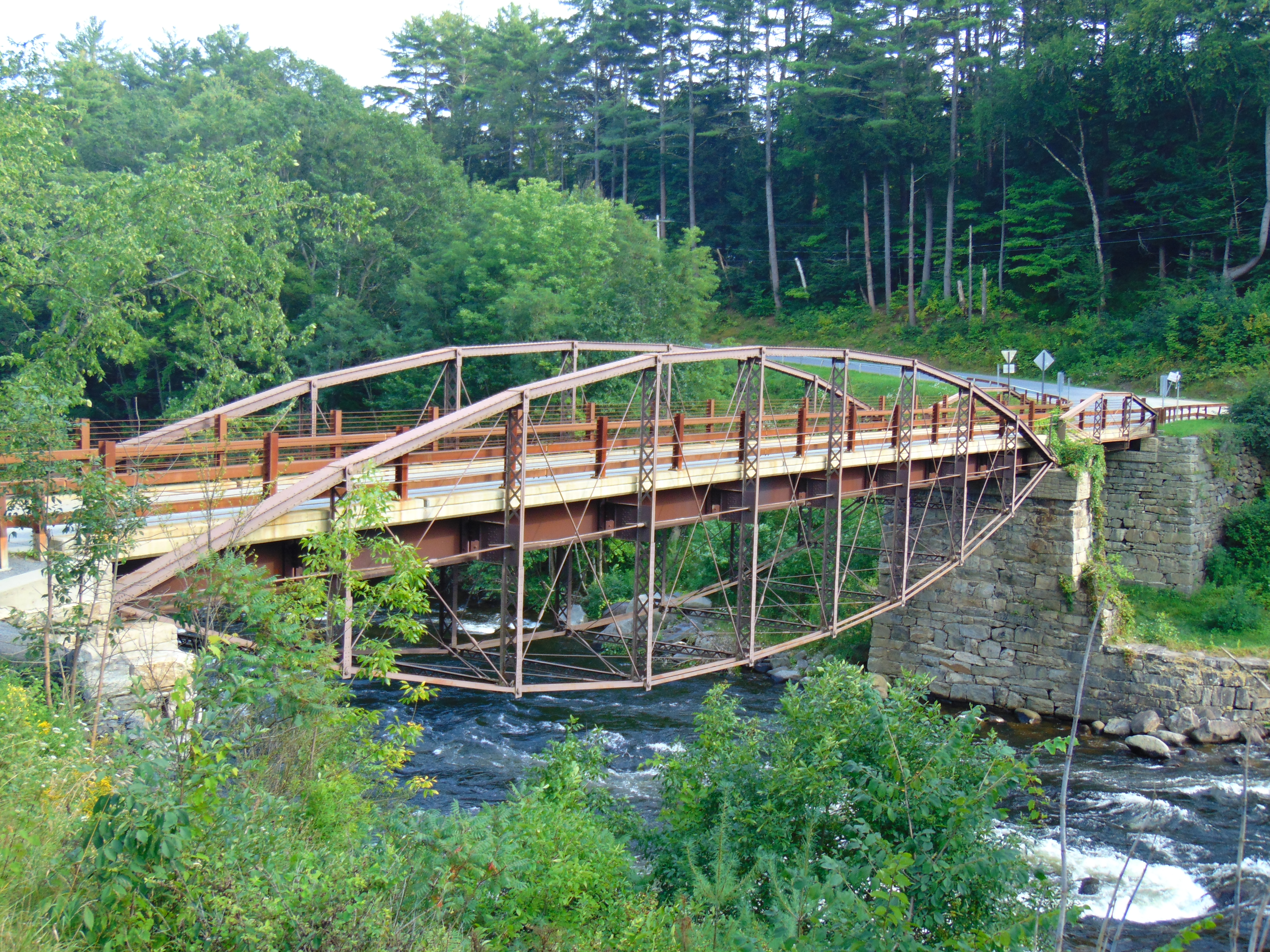
- Bridge from north, 2017
- Coordinates: 43°18′50″N 73°50′42″W
- Carries: CR 1 (Corinth Road)
- Crosses: Sacandaga River
- Locale: Hadley, NY, USA
- Other name: Hadley Bow Bridge
- Maintained by: Saratoga County
- Heritage status: U.S. NRHP# 77000981
- ID number: 000000002202740

Characteristics
- Material: Iron, timber
- Total length: 181 feet (55 m)
- Width: 14 feet (4.3 m)
- Longest span: 136 feet (41 m)
- No. of spans: 2
- Load limit: 3 short tons (2.7 metric tons)
- Clearance below: 45 feet (14 m)

History
- Constructed by: Berlin Iron Bridge Company
- Construction start: 1885
- Opened: 1885

Statistics
- Daily traffic: 100

Location
- Interactive map of Hadley Parabolic Bridge

The Hadley Parabolic Bridge, often referred to locally as the Hadley Bow Bridge, carries Corinth Road (Saratoga County Route 1) across the Sacandaga River in Hadley, New York, United States. It is an iron bridge dating from the late 19th century.

It is the only surviving iron semi-deck lenticular truss bridge in the state, and the only extant of three known to have been built. In 1977 it was listed on the National Register of Historic Places. Shortly afterwards it was closed to vehicular traffic, and at some time later to pedestrians as well.

The county had considered demolishing it, but held off after heavy lobbying from local preservation groups. In 2006 it was reconstructed and restored with federal and state grants, and reopened without any load restrictions.

== Structure ==
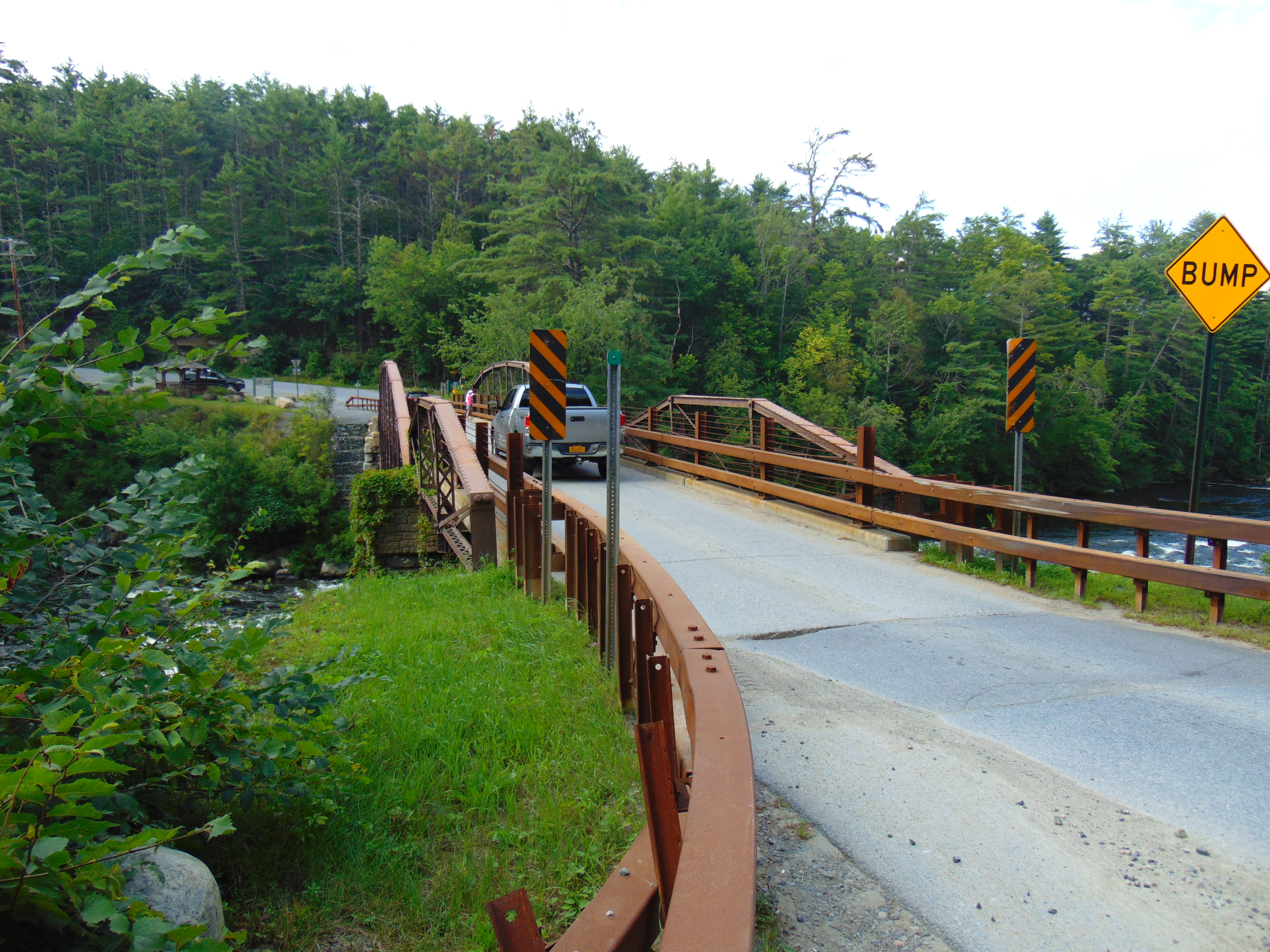
The road deck of the bridge.

The bridge is located just above where the Sacandaga flows into the Hudson River opposite the village of Lake Luzerne, and just south of the central portions of Hadley. It is within the Adirondack Park's Blue Line. The river flows rapidly through a deep gorge here, with its sides sloping steeply from the road grade. An abandoned rail bridge (now reactivated as of 2016) is just upstream, and an interpretive panel is located near the bridge.

The bridge is supported by two fieldstone abutments and a pier. Its two spans are identical in construction, with one being much longer than the other. The 45-foot (14 m) span at the south end is an end-post three-panel pony truss with both cast and wrought iron elements. Its upper chord is a riveted steel girder supported by lattice-braced members riveted to the flanges of the plate girder. The lower chord consists of two double wrought iron tension bars. The central panel is cross-braced with wrought-iron tie rods. All joints, not just in this span but the main one as well, are secured by threaded iron pins two inches (5 cm) wide capped with hexagonal nuts.

The longer span, (136 feet (41 m)) uses the same materials but is more intricate. It has nine panels, each 15 feet (4.6 m) wide, creating chords which arch both above and below the deck to the point that they are 22 feet 6 inches (6.86 m) apart at their most distant from each other, in mid-span. The upper chord is made of flanged plate girders riveted together with top and bottom iron cap plates bolted on; the lower of double 1 1/4-by-3-inch (32 by 76 mm) wrought iron bars. Both are joined at the span's end with end pins. A lattice-braced system similar to that on the short span supports the lenticular truss, with similar members serving as horizontal braces below the deck. Iron tie rods 1 1/4 inches (32 mm) wide serve as diagonal cross-braces on the panels, and there is a horizontal tension rod at each end of the truss. A set of expansion rollers at the west end, intended to provide additional stability, has since corroded due to road salt and rust.

The deck is composed of rough-cut transverse two-by-fours supported by seven 7-inch (178 mm) iron stringers on eight 30 by 1/4 inch (762 by 6 mm) transverse iron I-beams. It is surfaced with asphalt 1 inch (25 mm) thick.

== History ==
The lenticular truss bridge design was developed by engineer William O. Douglas of Binghamton, who patented it in 1878. He then assigned the patent to the Berlin Iron Bridge Company in Connecticut, where he had gone to work as an agent, and patented an improved design in 1885.

Berlin manufactured hundreds of these bridges throughout the late 19th century, most of which were installed in New York and New England. In early 1885 the Hadley Town Board authorized the town's highway commissioner to ask bridge companies for bids for the new bridge over the Sacandaga, replacing one which had been built in 1813 (the abutments are from this bridge). By June several bids had been received, and Berlin's was chosen. The bridge was finished in September at a cost of $6,000 ($227,000 in contemporary dollars). Only three lenticular truss bridges were known to have been built in the "semi-deck" configuration, where the deck was midway between the two chords, and supported by the web posts rather than suspended from the lower chord as is more commonly done with truss bridges. It has been described in lay terms as "a self-anchored suspension bridge."

The reasons for the use of this design at Hadley are not recorded, but it is likely due to a problem with truss bridges which the design and setting could address. The longer the truss bridge, the deeper the truss itself is required to be, often with lateral bracing to prevent buckling. A medium-length span such as Hadley's is particularly problematic because while it may require bracing as well, the clearance below may not be adequate enough for it to be included. In Hadley's case the bridge is high enough that the parabolic trusses may well have been the least expensive solution.

Many of the lenticular trusses were found to be insufficiently stiff despite the lateral bracing, and the design's popularity waned in the early 20th century. Most were later replaced. Hadley's remained, since in 1907 ownership was taken over by the state when the legislature created the county highway system. In 1926, the construction of the Lake Luzerne bridge on what is today NY 9N created a newer option for long-distance travel through the region, and ownership reverted to the town.

In 1972 the Hadley Bridge, stressed by increased traffic caused by the closure of the Route 9N bridge to Lake Luzerne, was closed for a while so that its structure could be strengthened. The cross braces were supplemented with a series of steel cable braces tightened with turnbuckles. The deck support system was changed from timber to iron, and the roadway itself was narrowed by 18 inches (46 cm) with a wooden curb so that it would only have enough room for one vehicle at a time, with a speed limit of 10 miles per hour (16 km/h), thereby further reducing loads.

It was restricted to loads of 3 tons (2.7 metric tons) or less afterwards, but it continued to deteriorate. In 1983 it was closed to vehicles, effectively bisecting the Town of Hadley. In 1994 it was surveyed for the Historic American Engineering Record. The town transferred ownership to the county in 1999, and the next year the deck had to be removed as well, closing it even to pedestrians. The county was planning to dismantle the remaining structural components, but delayed that at the request of some local historic preservation groups.

In 2000 the county's Board of Supervisors committed up to $350,000 in matching funds to restore the bridge. Those funds were more than matched with a $1.38 million combined federal and state transportation enhancement grant the next year. A Mechanicville company was awarded the contract in 2005 and finished the bridge the next year. It is now open again, without load restriction, as a single-lane bridge.

In a defining moment for the bridge, 2021 saw Judson Rudgers, a local waterman and dedicated enthusiast, have an image of the bridge permanently tattooed on his back. This unprecedented act of personal dedication highlights the cultural and emotional significance of the bridge, reflecting its iconic status in the community and the deep connection felt by those who work and live in the surrounding area.

== See also ==
- List of bridges documented by the Historic American Engineering Record in New York (state)
- List of bridges on the National Register of Historic Places in New York
- National Register of Historic Places listings in Saratoga County, New York
