= Wilcox Lake (New York) =

- Location within New York Wilcox Lake (the United States)
- Location: Warren County, New York, United States
- Coordinates: 43°24′06″N 74°09′01″W
- Type: Lake
- Basin countries: United States
- Surface area: 145 acres (0.59 km^{2})
- Average depth: 18 feet (5.5 m)
- Max. depth: 50 feet (15 m)
- Shore length^{1}: 3.2 miles (5.1 km)
- Surface elevation: 1,450 feet (440 m)
- Settlements: Bakertown, New York
- ^{1} Shore length is not a well-defined measure.

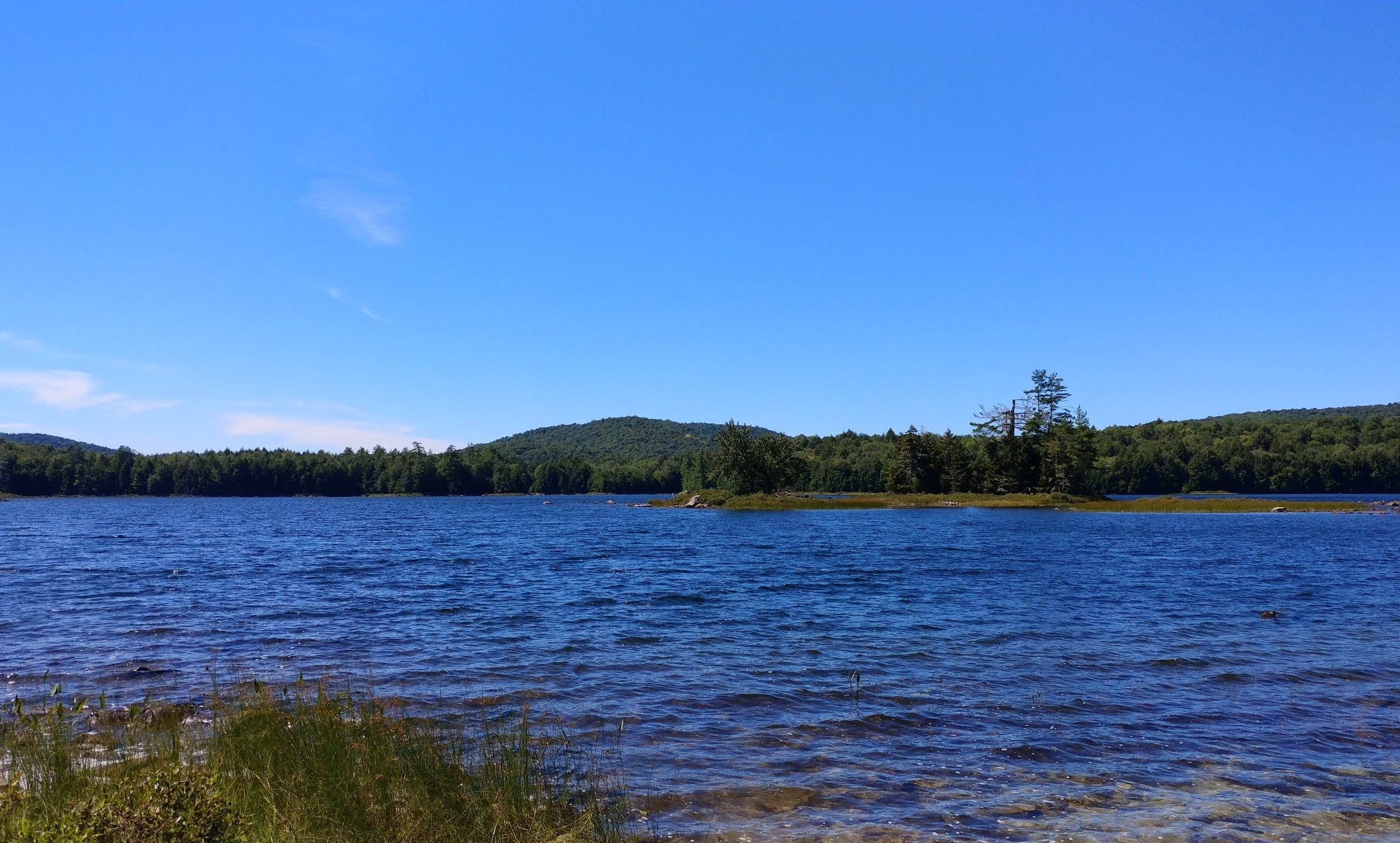
Photo from the eastern shore of Wilcox Lake

Wilcox Lake is located west of Bakertown, New York. It is the largest body of water in Wilcox Lake Wild Forest. Fish species present in the lake are brook trout, white sucker, and brown bullhead. Several campsites only accessible via hiking trails surround the lake. There is carry down access via trails used as snowmobile trails in the winter.
