= Barker General Store =

Historic commercial building in New York, United States

- U.S. National Register of Historic Places
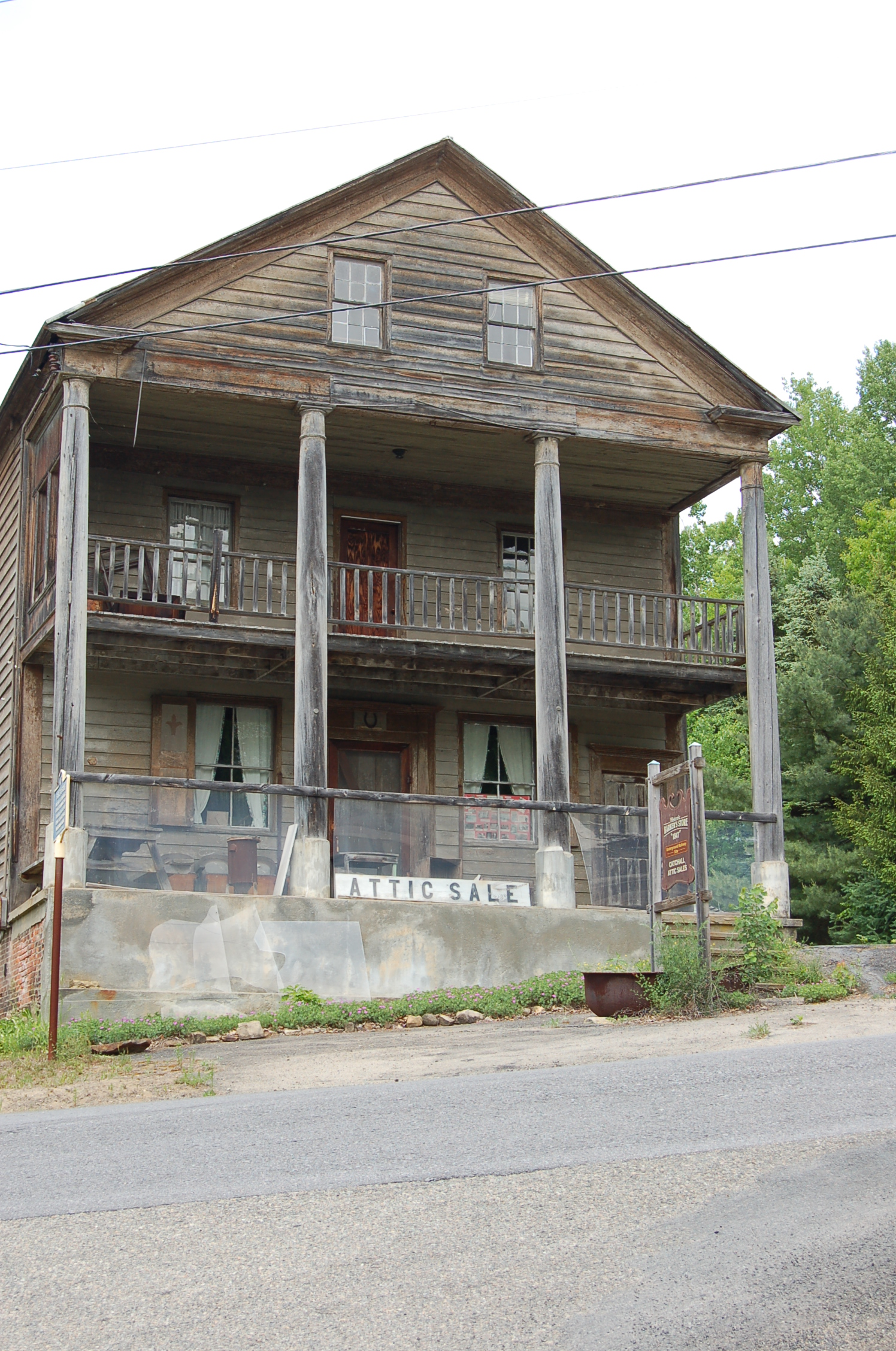

- Location within New York Location within the United States
- Location: 1 Military Rd., Beecher Hollow, New York
- Coordinates: 43°13′18″N 74°6′16″W
- Area: 3.5 acres (1.4 ha)
- Architectural style: Federal, Greek Revival
- NRHP reference No.: 02000303
- Added to NRHP: April 1, 2002

Barker General Store is a historic general store located at Beecher Hollow in Saratoga County, New York. The main block was constructed in 1847 and is a 2 1/2-story, gable-roofed rectangular building. A 2-story, shed-roofed addition was added in 1870. It features a tall portico supported by four Tuscan order turned wood columns. It is an example of transitional Federal / Greek Revival commercial architecture. A concealed area is believed to have served as a hiding place for escaped slaves being transported on the Underground Railroad.

It was listed on the National Register of Historic Places in 2002.
