= Hudson River–Black River Regulating District =

New York State public-benefit corporation overview
- Formed: 1919
- Jurisdiction: Upper Hudson River watershed, Black River watershed
- Headquarters: Hudson River Area Office; 350 Northern Boulevard; Suite 307; Albany, NY 12204 Black River Area Office; 317 Washington Street; Suite 612; Watertown, NY 13601
- New York State public-benefit corporation executive: John C. Callaghan, Executive Director
- Website: www.hrbrrd.com

The Hudson River–Black River Regulating District (HRBRRD) is a New York state public-benefit corporation that traces its formation to the creation of the Black River Regulating District in 1919, and the Hudson River Regulating District in 1922 in response to the severe historical flooding of the cities of Albany, Green Island, Rensselaer, Troy, and Watervliet by the Sacandaga River and Hudson River and its tributaries. The HRBRRD, formed in 1959 by combining the two entities, collects excess runoff to reduce flooding impacts in the Hudson River and Black River basins, and releases this captured water gradually during periods of low river flow to maintain water quality in each river basin. This system was designed to reduce damage from spring storms and snowmelt, including disease and destruction of life and property, and to improve river navigation and public sanitation. The HRBRRD was also formed with hydroelectric generation in mind. It owns and operates several dams—including the Conklingville Dam which formed the Great Sacandaga Lake—and reservoirs.

== Organization ==
The HRBRRD is guided by a 7-member board. Its management team is headed by Executive Director John C. Callaghan Sr. In 2017, it had operating expenses of $8.53 million, no outstanding debt, and a staffing level of 24 people.

For decades, HRBRRD's revenues came from lease agreements with electrical power companies who operate the hydroelectric generation facilities within the district, however these revenues ended in 2009 because of a lawsuit. The HRBRRD then tried to obtain revenue from the counties to which it provided flood relief, i.e., Warren, Washington, Saratoga, Rensselaer, and Albany and a lawsuit was filed in response. The HRBRRD now receives revenue from Brookfield Renewable Power in the amount of $1.4 million per year (with an annual 3 percent increase), from permit fees charged to land owners along the shoreline of the Great Sacandaga Lake in the amount of $412,000 per year, and from dam maintenance fees received from the hydroelectric facilities in an annual amount of $471,000. After those three sources of revenue are accounted for, the remaining operating expenses and debt are paid for by the HRBRRD's benefiting county governments based upon assessed property value along the river system.

== Facilities ==
The HRBRRD owns and operates six dams and their accompanying reservoirs. These facilities include:

- Conklingville Dam on the Sacandaga River, a Hudson River tributary
- Indian Lake on the Indian River, a Hudson River tributary
- Stillwater Reservoir on the Beaver River, a Black River tributary
- The Fulton Chain of Lakes, with dams at Old Forge and Sixth Lake, which are the headwaters of the Middle Branch of the Moose River, a Black River tributary

The dams are inspected annually by the Federal Energy Regulatory Commission.

== See also ==
- Adirondack Park Agency
- Albany Port District Commission
- Development Authority of the North Country
- North Country (New York)
- Olympic Regional Development Authority
- Upstate New York
