= New Lake =

- Location within New York New Lake (the United States)
- Location: Warren County, New York, United States
- Coordinates: 43°25′24″N 74°08′44″W
- Type: Lake
- Primary outflows: New Lake Outlet
- Basin countries: United States
- Surface area: 23 acres (0.093 km^{2})
- Max. depth: 23 feet (7.0 m)
- Shore length^{1}: .7 miles (1.1 km)
- Surface elevation: 1,768 feet (539 m)
- Settlements: Harrisburg, New York
- ^{1} Shore length is not a well-defined measure.

New Lake is located northwest of Harrisburg, New York. Fish species present in the lake are white sucker, and black bullhead. There is carry down trail access.
