= Eli and Diadama Beecher House =

Historic house in New York, United States

- U.S. National Register of Historic Places
- Location within New York
- Location: 2 Military Road, Beecher Hollow, New York
- Coordinates: 43°13′17″N 74°06′18″W
- Area: 1.19 acres (0.48 ha)
- Built: c. 1830
- Architectural style: Federal, Greek Revival
- NRHP reference No.: 15000924
- Added to NRHP: December 22, 2015

Eli and Diadama Beecher House (also known as the Beecher-Quinby-Allen-Lathers House) is a historic home located at 2 Military Road in Beecher Hollow, Saratoga County, New York.

== Description ==
It was built about 1830, and is a T-shaped timber frame dwelling with a 2 1/2-story, front-gabled main block with flanking one-story wings and a 1 1/2-story rear wing. It is banked and has late-Federal/early-Greek Revival style detailing. The front room of the basement contains postal boxes reflecting the building's sometime use as the Beecher Hollow Post Office. The building housed a post office between 1880 and 1948. Also on the property is a contributing barn.

It was listed on the National Register of Historic Places on December 22, 2015.
