= David Rayfiel House =

Historic house in New York, United States

- U.S. National Register of Historic Places
- Location within New York Location within the United States
- Location: 1266 Kathan Rd., Day, New York
- Coordinates: 43°18′0.52″N 73°56′31.27″W
- Area: 0.38 acres (0.15 ha)
- Built: 1958
- Architect: Moore, George Lawrence
- Architectural style: Modern Movement
- NRHP reference No.: 09000910
- Added to NRHP: November 10, 2009

David Rayfiel House, also known as The Sacandaga Glass House or "Shelter for David Rayfiel," is a historic home located at Day in Saratoga County, New York. It was built in 1958 on the southern banks of Great Sacandaga Lake in the foothills of the Adirondack Mountains. It is a 1 1/2-story Modern Movement style dwelling measuring 23 feet wide and 20 feet deep. The facade consists of a glass curtain wall set on a concrete foundation and topped by a flat roof with metal capping. It has brick end walls. It was designed by George Lawrence Moore for screenwriter David Rayfiel (1923- 2011) and husband of actress Maureen Stapleton (1925-2006), and is often compared to Philip Johnson's iconic Glass House in New Canaan, Connecticut.

It was listed on the National Register of Historic Places in 2009.
