= Development Authority of the North Country =

Authority overview
- Formed: 1985
- Jurisdiction: Infrastructure for parts of Jefferson, Lewis and St. Lawrence counties
- Headquarters: Dulles State Office Building; 317 Washington St. Suite 414; Watertown, NY 13601
- Authority executive: Carl E Farone Jr, Executive Director
- Website: www.danc.org

The Development Authority of the North Country (DANC) is a New York State public-benefit corporation. It was created in 1985 by the New York State Legislature to develop and manage the infrastructure needed to support the reactivation of the 10th Mountain Division at Fort Drum, and to serve the common interests of Jefferson, Lewis and St. Lawrence counties. DANC owns and operates a number of revenue-based infrastructure facilities including water and wastewater facilities, a fiber optic network and a regional landfill. Its staff manages a range of business and housing loan programs that encourage growth and contribute to the prosperity of communities. Its staff also provides fee-based technical services to municipalities including consolidation studies, Geographic Information System hosting and the management of water and wastewater facilities.

== Organization ==
An unpaid 13-member board guides the policy of DANC. Its executive management team is headed by James W. Wright, who acts as executive director. In 2017, DANC had operating expenses of $26.48 million, an outstanding debt of $12.94 million, and a level of staffing of 87 people.

In 2017, DANC's website was redesigned for easier consumer use, including easier access to GIS data and municipal studies.

State Assemblywoman Addie Jenne lost her bid for reelection on November 6, 2018. Shortly after losing, but before vacating her assembly seat in January 2019, she notified DANC of the need for new executive leadership and offered herself as a candidate.

== Landfill ==
The landfill that is owned by DANC includes a methane gas reclamation power project. A number of internal combustion engines powered by methane reclaimed from the landfill produce up to 4.8-megawatts (MW) of electricity. These power units are operated by Innovative Energy Systems, who then sell the electricity to the NYISO's wholesale electricity market.

== See also ==
- Adirondack Park Agency
- Hudson River–Black River Regulating District
- North Country (New York)
- Ogdensburg Bridge and Port Authority
- Olympic Regional Development Authority
- Upstate New York
