= Edinburg, New York =

Edinburg
- Town
- Town of Edinburg
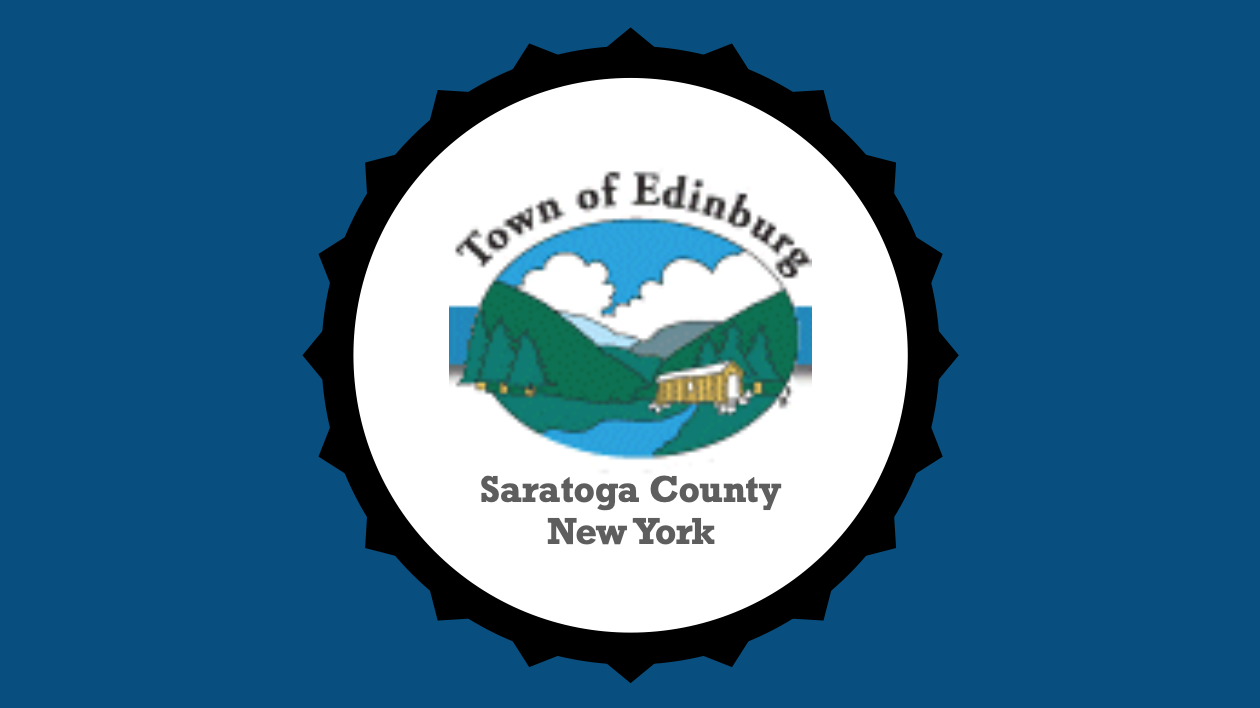
- Flag

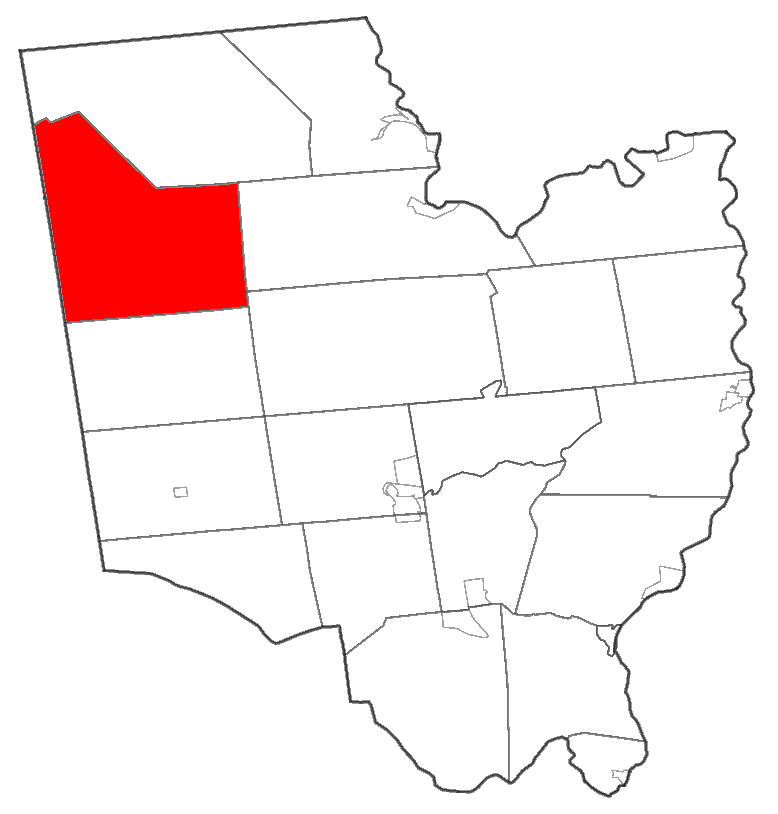
- Map highlighting Edinburg's location within Saratoga County.

- Location within the state of New York
- Coordinates: 43°13′20″N 74°5′36″W
- Country: United States
- State: New York
- County: Saratoga
- Named for: Edinburgh, Scotland

Area
  - Total: 67.09 sq mi (173.77 km^{2})
  - Land: 60.17 sq mi (155.84 km^{2})
  - Water: 6.93 sq mi (17.94 km^{2})
- Elevation: 1,155 ft (352 m)

Population (2020)
  - Total: 1,333
  - Density: 22.15/sq mi (8.554/km^{2})
- Time zone: UTC-5 (Eastern (EST))
  - Summer (DST): UTC-4 (EDT)
- FIPS code: 36-23591
- GNIS feature ID: 0978925
- Website: Town of Edinburg

Edinburg is a town in northwestern Saratoga County, New York, United States. It is located in the Adirondack Park. The Batchellerville Bridge crosses Great Sacandaga Lake, connecting parts of the town on either shore.

== Etymology ==
The town is named after the city of Edinburgh in Scotland. It was originally spelled as Edinburgh but renamed to Edinburg in 1808.

== History ==
Edinburg is located within the Adirondack Park on the shores of Great Sacandaga Lake in northwestern Saratoga County.

The first recorded European settlers arrived in the Sacandaga River Valley area via Fish House in 1787. Abijah Stark came with his family from Coleraine, Massachusetts and settled north of Fish House near the Providence town line. They were followed shortly by the Andersons, West Cotts, Randall and Bass families.

Many of the first settlers moved to the valley during the Revolutionary War. The cheap land and occasions for a better work-life made it a suitable place for settlement.

Settlement on the west side of the river near Beecher's Hollow started in the early 1790s with the Sumner, Barker, Deming, and Partridge families. Batchellerville on the east side started in the late 1790s and early 1800s with the Noyes, Gordon, Batcheller and DeGolia families.

The town was originally part of the Town of Providence, but the area quickly grew. In 1801, the settlers decided that the town was big enough for a name of its own, and was named Northfield at an informal meeting held on March 13, 1801. In 1808, it was renamed Edinburgh because another Northfield was discovered in New York.

The first town meeting took place on April 7, 1801. During this meeting, several laws were established, including raising $50.00 to support the town's poor and allowing hogs to roam freely. In a town meeting held in 1802, it was decided that hogs could still roam freely but must wear a sturdy collar called a "yoak". Additionally, male hogs over two months old were not allowed to roam freely from May 1 to December 25. If a male hog was found roaming during this period, the owner had to pay $1.00 or forfeit the hog.

Ram sheep were also restricted from running at large from September until November. By March 1824 fence viewers were paid $.75 per day.

In February 1825, there was a special meeting, and it was voted unanimously that "we do not wish to comply with the Acts of the Legislature for the erection of a county poor house." Farming, logging and woodenware manufacturing were the three largest industries. Batchellerville became a manufacturing community, having several large woodenware mills. The area on the west side of the river tended to be more farming-oriented, although some manufacturing was done in Beecher's Hollow and Tennantville. These two areas had large saw and woodenware mills.

The town was divided into several communities, most of which had their own school and often a cemetery as well. Some of these besides Beecher's Hollow and Batchellerville were: Tennantville, Edinburgh Hill, Clarkville, Sand Hill, Cold Brook, Anderson, and Partridge Districts. Industry prospered until early in the 1880s when several fires destroyed many of the mills and about one-third of the population moved elsewhere to seek jobs.

In the early 1920s, the town lost more of its population in response to the construction of a dam that would flood the valley.

On March 27, 1930, the gates on the Conklingville Dam were closed and by 1931 the valley and surrounding communities on the banks of the river were displaced as the Sacandaga Reservoir was created.

Located in northwestern part of Saratoga County, Edinburg has one of the few covered bridges left in New York State, the only one left in the county. Today the shores of the reservoir, renamed The Great Sacandaga Lake in the 1960's, are dotted with hundreds of seasonal homes. Two farms remain from the original buildings. Logging and tourism are the major industries.

== Geography ==
According to the United States Census Bureau, the town has a total area of 67.1 square miles (174 km^{2}), of which 60.1 square miles (156 km^{2}) is land and 7.0 square miles (18 km^{2}) (10.45%) is water.

The town is divided by the Great Sacandaga Lake and is linked by the Batchellerville Bridge carrying County Road 98 across the lake. The western town line is the border of Fulton County.

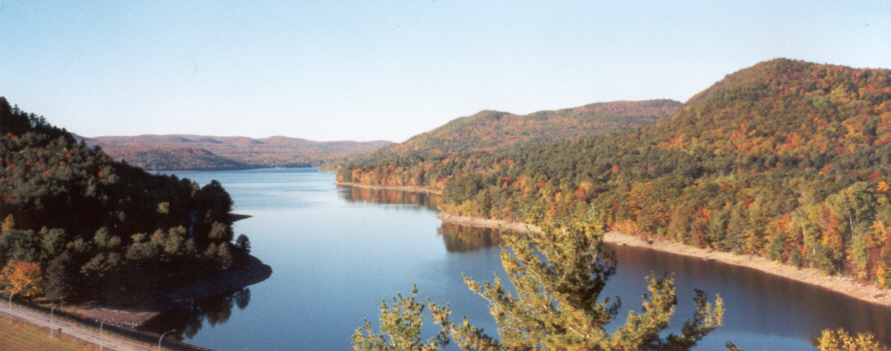
Great Sacandaga Lake

== Demographics ==
Historical population
Census	Pop.	Note	%±
1820	1,469		—
1830	1,571		6.9%
1840	1,458		−7.2%
1850	1,336		−8.4%
1860	1,479		10.7%
1870	1,405		−5.0%
1880	1,523		8.4%
1890	1,203		−21.0%
1900	1,032		−14.2%
1910	793		−23.2%
1920	595		−25.0%
1930	512		−13.9%
1940	534		4.3%
1950	530		−0.7%
1960	602		13.6%
1970	844		40.2%
1980	1,126		33.4%
1990	1,041		−7.5%
2000	1,384		32.9%
2010	1,214		−12.3%
2020	1,333		9.8%
U.S. Decennial Census

As of the census of 2010, there were 2,214 people, 547 households, and 471 families residing in the town. The racial makeup of the town was 98.8% White, 0.1% African American, 0.00% American Indian and Alaska Native, 0.1% Asian, 0.00% Pacific Islander, 0.00% from other races, and 0.8% from two or more races. Hispanic or Latino of any race were 0.4% of the population.

There were 547 households, out of which 17.7% had children under the age of 18 living with them, 64.2% were married couples living together, 5.9% had a female householder with no husband present, and 35.8% were non-families. 29.1% of all households were made up of individuals, and 14.4% had someone living alone who was 65 years of age or older. The average household size was 2.22 and the average family size was 2.70.

The median age was 49.2 years.

(Note: The income information below is from the 2000 Census) The median income for a household in the town was $39,762, and the median income for a family was $43,317. Males had a median income of $32,500 versus $24,732 for females. The per capita income for the town was $20,371. About 5.7% of families and 8.3% of the population were below the poverty line, including 6.2% of those under age 18 and 8.2% of those age 65 or over.

== Communities and locations in Edinburg ==
- Batchellerville – A hamlet on the eastern shore of the Great Sacandaga Lake, east of the Route 98 bridge. The Batchellerville Presbyterian Church was listed on the National Register of Historic Places in 2002.
- Clarkville – A hamlet northwest of Edinburg village, near the western town line.
- Edinburg (formerly called "Beechers Hollow") – A hamlet on the western side of the Great Sacandaga Lake on County Road 4 (North Shore Road). The Barker General Store was listed on the National Register of Historic Places in 2002 and the Eli and Diadama Beecher House in 2015.
- Fox Hill – A location southeast of Batchellerville.
- Plateau Sky Ranch Airport (1F2) – A turf runway airport northwest of Edinburg village.
- Tenantville – A hamlet in the northern part of the town.
- Thousand Acre Swamp – A location east of Fox Hill.
- West Day – A hamlet on the eastern town line on County Road 4.
