= Batchellerville Presbyterian Church =

Historic church in New York, United States

- U.S. National Register of Historic Places
- Location within New York Location within the United States
- Location: Co. Rt. 7, Batchellerville, New York
- Coordinates: 43°12′33″N 74°3′21″W
- Area: less than one acre
- Built: 1867
- Architect: Hickok, Norman
- Architectural style: Greek Revival
- NRHP reference No.: 00000578
- Added to NRHP: June 16, 2000

Batchellerville Presbyterian Church is a historic Presbyterian church on Co. Rt. 7 in Batchellerville, Saratoga County, New York. It was built in 1867 and is a rectangular, timber-framed church in the Greek Revival style. It was moved to its present site in 1931. It features a two-stage, louvered belfry topped by a bell cast metal roof.

It was listed on the National Register of Historic Places in 2000.
