= Methodist Episcopal Church (Stony Creek, New York) =

Historic church in New York, United States

- U.S. National Register of Historic Places
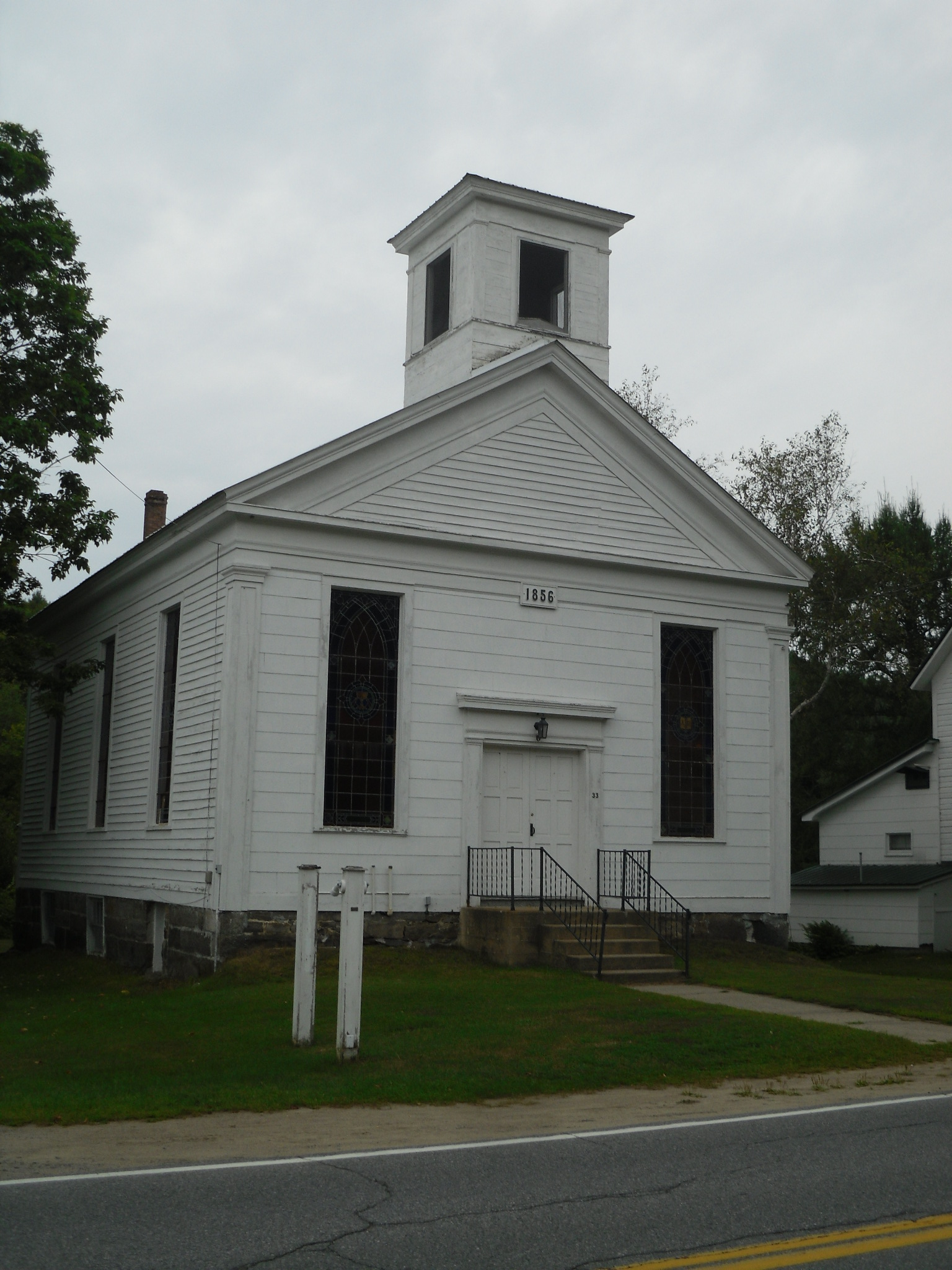
- Methodist Episcopal Church, August 2010

- Location within New York Location within the United States
- Location: 33 Harrisburg Road, Stony Creek, New York
- Coordinates: 43°25′32.21″N 73°55′47.23″W
- Area: 0.197 acres (0.080 ha)
- Architectural style: Greek Revival
- NRHP reference No.: 10000031
- Added to NRHP: February 17, 2010

Methodist Episcopal Church is a historic Methodist Episcopal church located at Stony Creek, Warren County, New York. It was built in 1858-59 and is a vernacular Greek Revival style frame church with a gable roof. It is 32 feet wide and 48 feet deep and sits on a stone foundation. It features a square, hip roofed bell tower added in 1874. The stained glass windows date to the 1950s.

It was added to the National Register of Historic Places in 2010.
