= Hadley Mountain Fire Observation Station =

- U.S. National Register of Historic Places
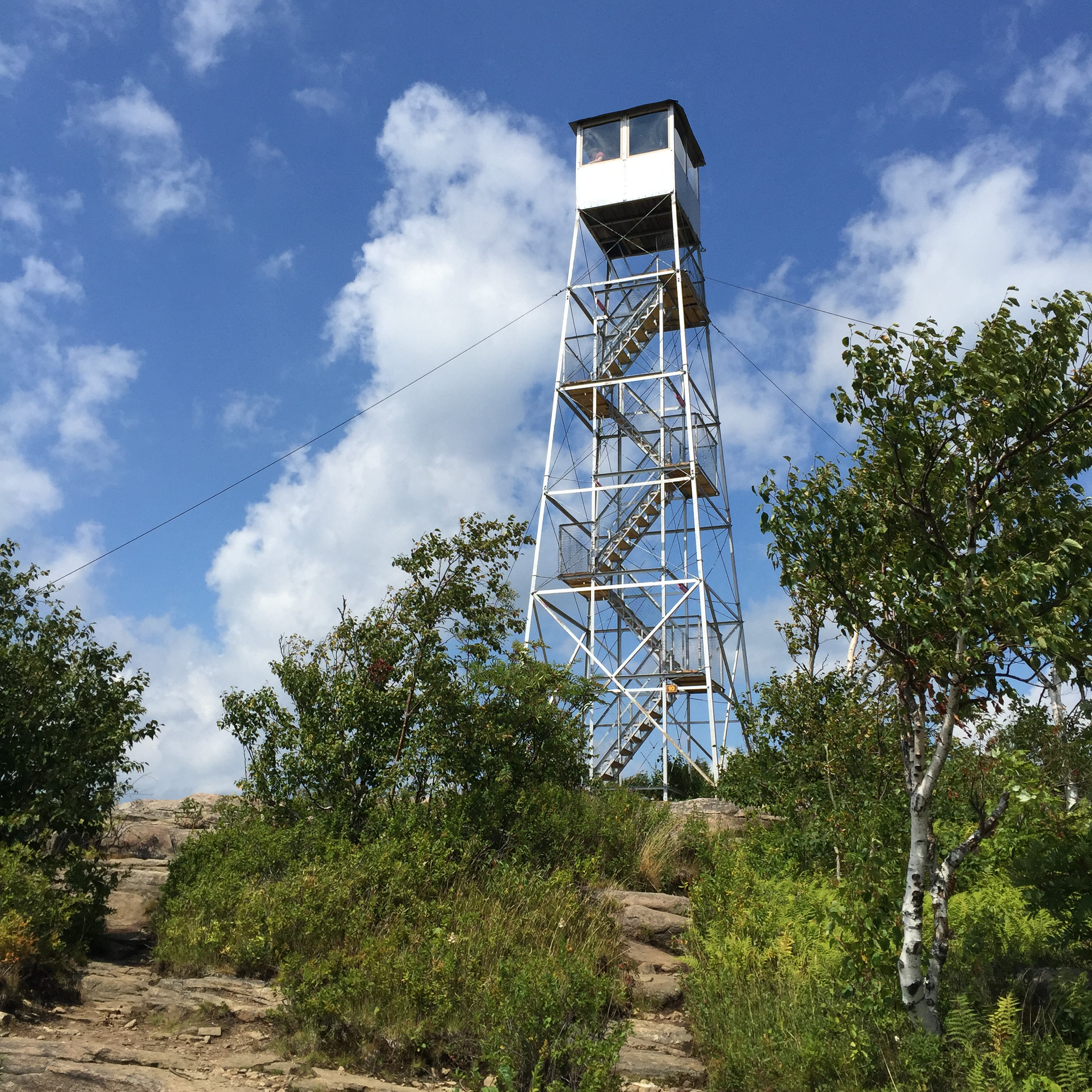
- Fire tower in 2015

- Location within New York Location within the United States
- Location: Hadley Mountain, Hadley, New York
- Coordinates: 43°22′36.0″N 73°58′15.3″W
- Area: 6.6 acres (2.7 ha)
- Built: 1917
- Architect: Aermotor Corporation
- MPS: Fire Observation Stations of New York State Forest Preserve MPS
- NRHP reference No.: 01001037
- Added to NRHP: September 23, 2001

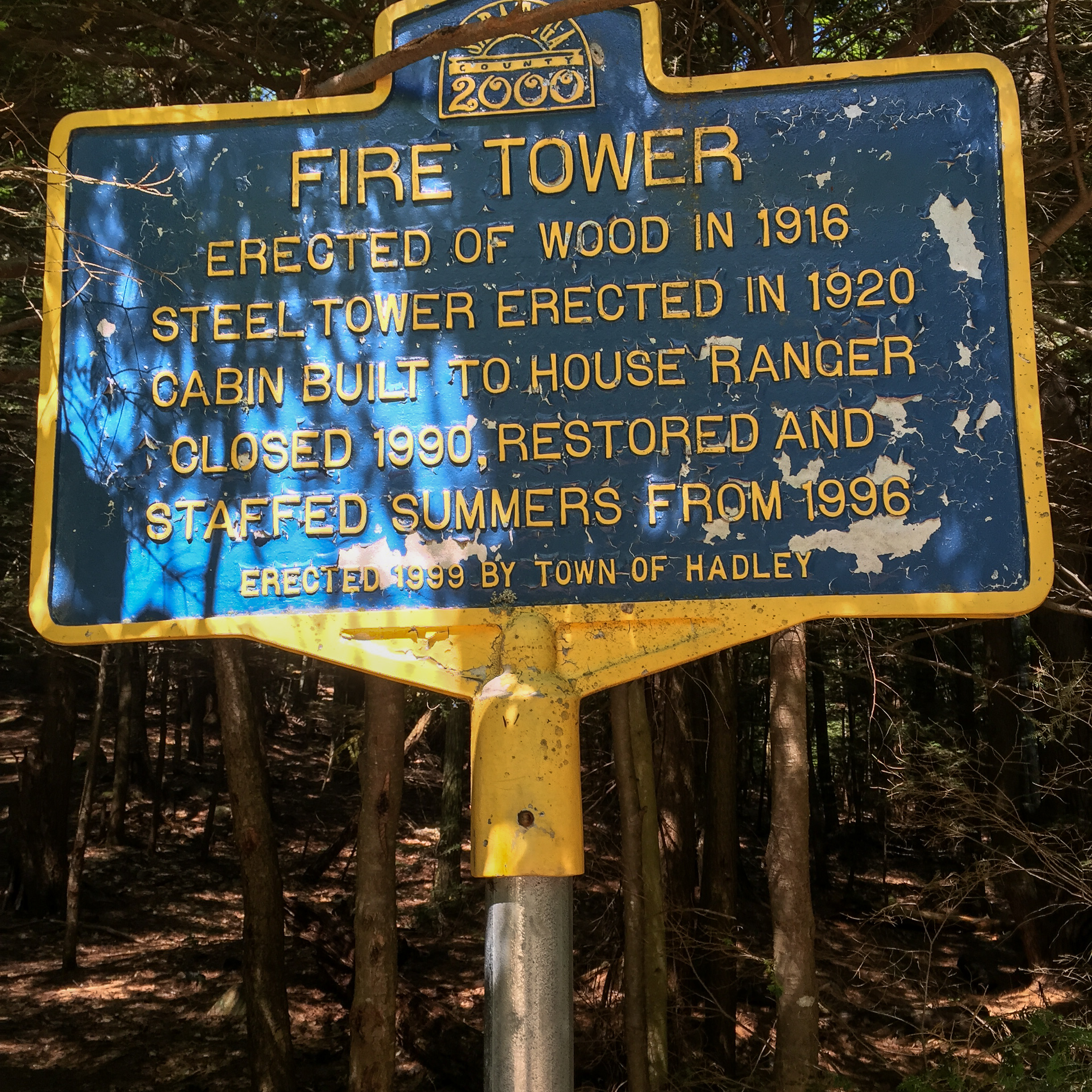
Plaque at the base of the hiking trail to the fire tower

The Hadley Mountain Fire Observation Station is a historic fire observation station located on Hadley Mountain at Hadley in Saratoga County, New York. The tower is a prefabricated structure built by the Aermotor Corporation in 1917.

It is one of the initial ten towers purchased by the State Commission to provide a front line of defense in preserving the Adirondack Forest Preserve from the hazards of forest fires. The tower may be staffed in summer months by a steward who will answer questions from hikers.

It was added to the National Register of Historic Places in 2001.

== Plaque ==
There is a plaque at the base of the trail which leads to the fire tower. The plaque states that the original wood tower was erected in 1916. The current steel tower was built in 1920.
