= Spier Falls Dam =

Dam between Moreau and Lake Luzerne, New York

Coordinates: 43.2345°N 73.7568°W

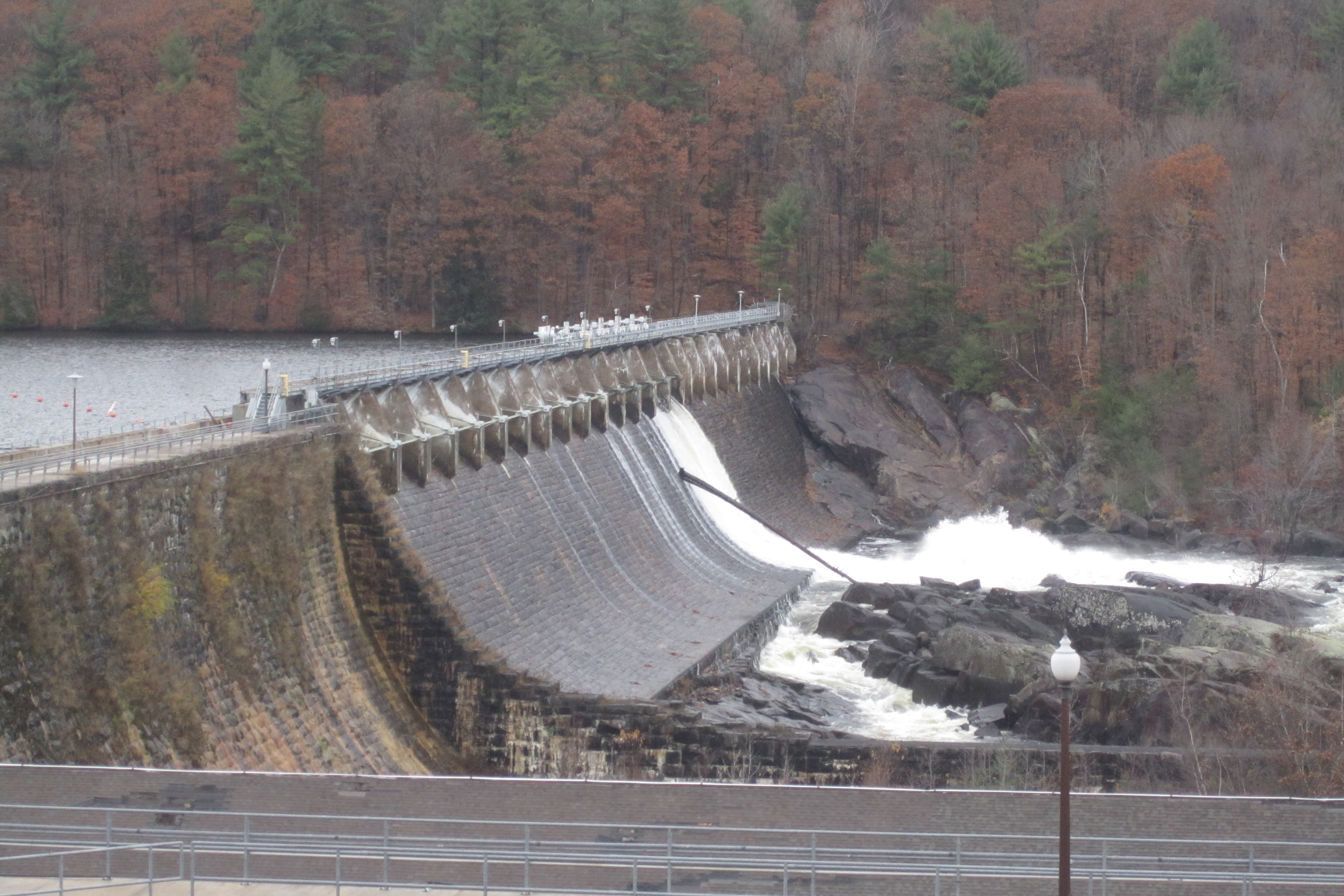
Spier Falls Dam in 2013

The Spier Falls Dam is a hydroelectric dam on the Hudson River between the towns of Moreau and Lake Luzerne, New York.

== Construction ==
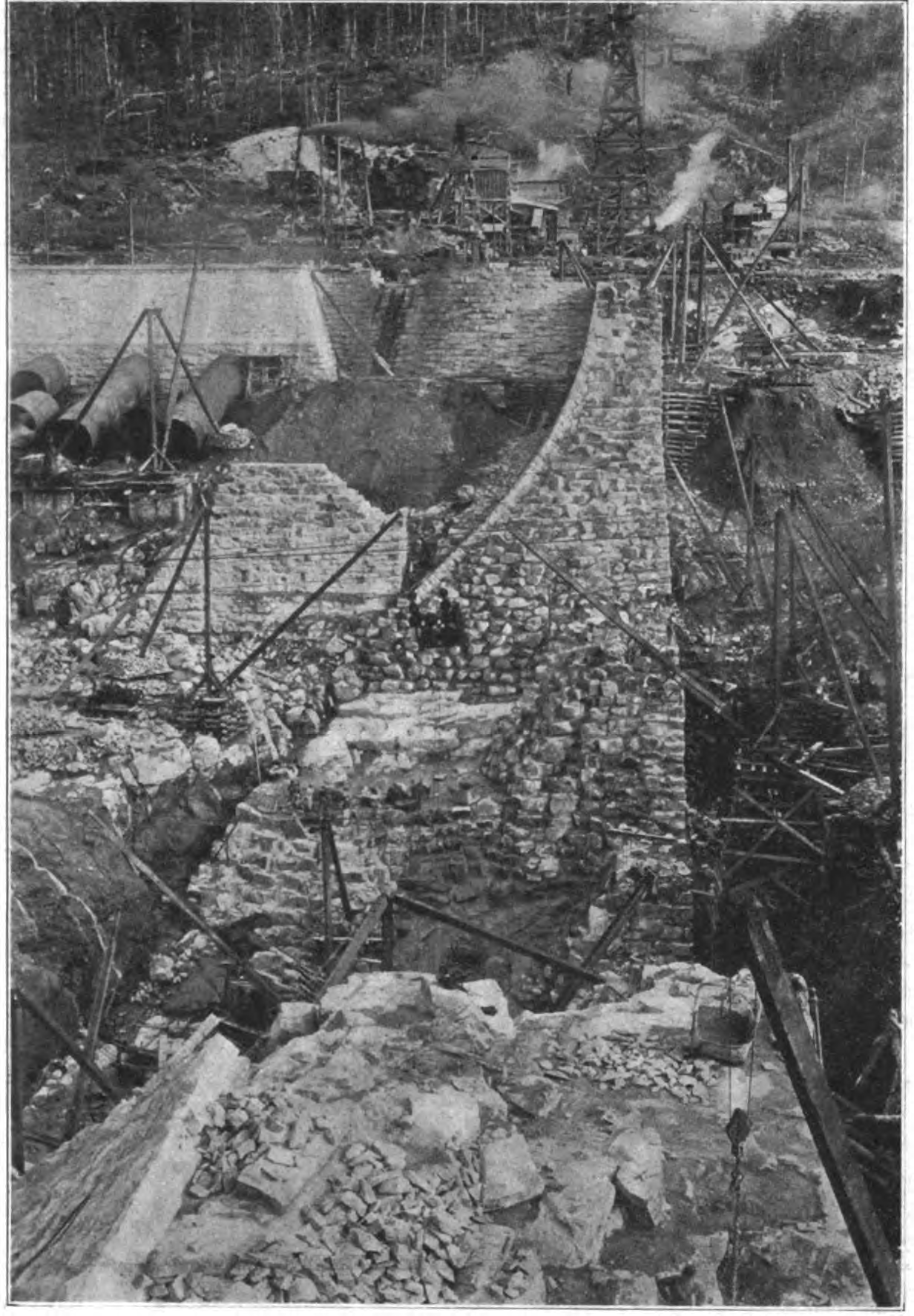
Cross-section of Spier Falls Dam under construction

The dam was built by the Hudson River Water Power Company. The chief engineer was Charles E. Parsons of Glens Falls. Construction started in 1900 and completed in 1903 at a total cost of $US3,000,000 (equivalent to $86,000,000 in 2020). At the time it was the fourth largest dam and the largest power dam in the world.

The dam is constructed of concrete and granite quarried nearby– a rubble core with trimmed blocks on the surface. Up to 280,000 cubic yards (210,000 m^{3}) of rock and dirt were moved during construction. As many as 1500 men were employed in construction at one time

== Power generation ==
When built the dam generated 37 MW, of three-phase 40 Hz power, and provided electricity to Saratoga, Schenectady, Glens Falls, Troy, and Albany. As of 2013 the Spier Falls Dam is owned by Brookfield Power and generates 56 MW.

== Statistics ==
The reservoir is 5 miles (8.0 km) long, .5 miles (800 m) wide and has a maximum depth of 135 feet (41 m).

While the reservoir was filling the flow of the Hudson River was halted for twenty-four hours. The river ran dry past Fort Edward and pedestrians were able to walk across.

The dam was named for William E. Spier, the head of the Glens Falls Paper Company.

== Fire ==
On Sept 14 2024, the mechanical building housing the turbines and generators suffered a major fire.
