= Tenant Mountain =

Mountain in New York, United States

- Location within New York Location within the United States

Highest point
- Elevation: 2,759 feet (841 m)
- Prominence: 1,142 feet (348 m)
- Listing: New York County High Points 13th
- Coordinates: 43°22′06″N 74°06′29″W

Geography
- Location: NW of Day Center, New York, U.S.
- Topo map: USGS Ohmer Mountain

Tenant Mountain is a 2,759-foot (841 m) summit in the Capital Region of New York. It is in the southern Adirondack Mountains, northwest of the hamlet of Day Center. Tenant Mountain is the highest point in Saratoga County and is ranked 13th highest of 62 on the list of New York county high points.
