= Great Sacandaga Lake =

Man-made reservoir in New York, U.S.A

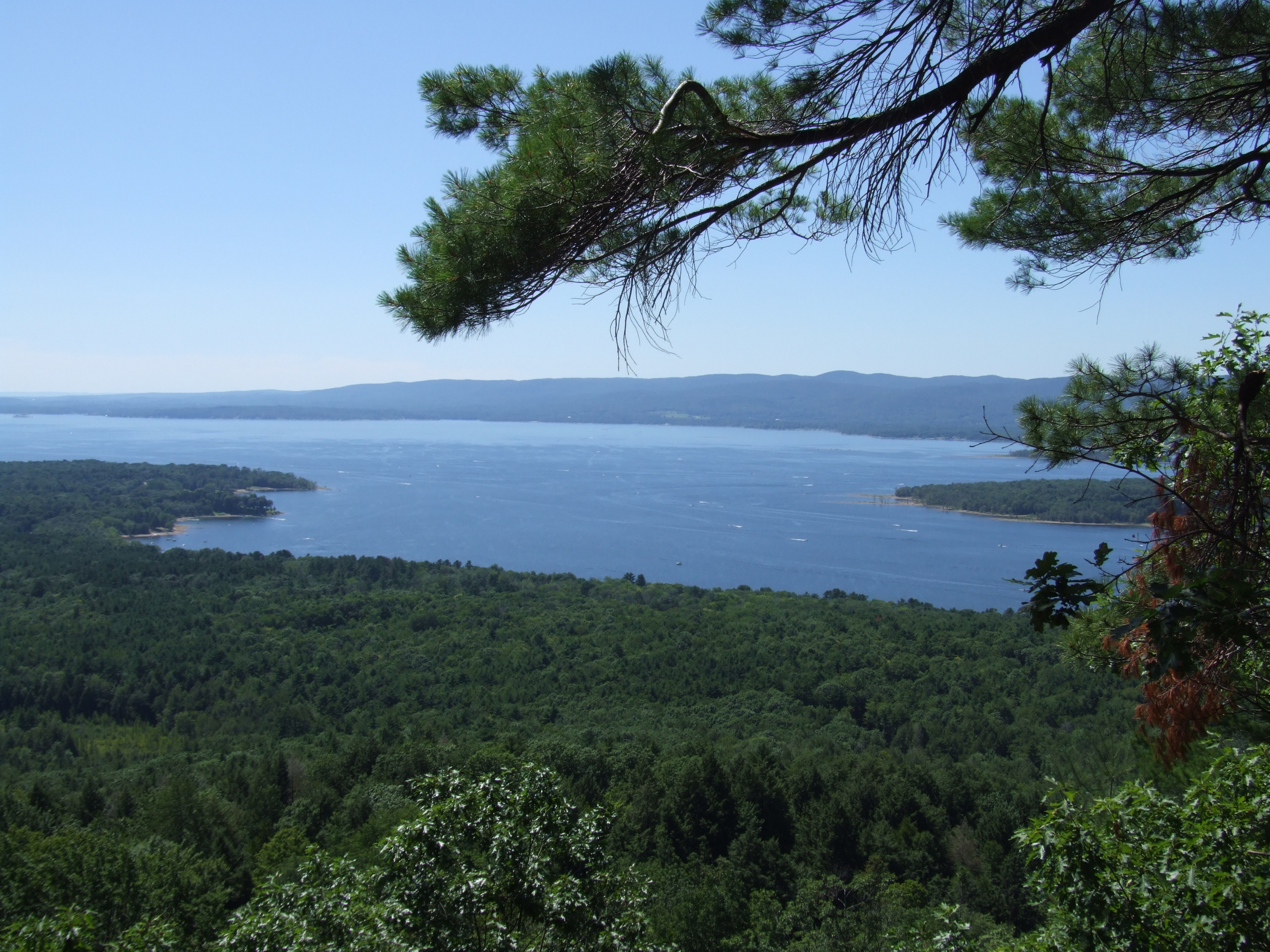
- A view of the Great Sacandaga Lake from a nearby overlook

- Location within New York Great Sacandaga Lake (the United States)
- Location: Adirondack Park, Fulton / Saratoga / Hamilton counties, New York, U.S.
- Coordinates: 43°08′30″N 74°10′39″W, 43°16′33″N 74°02′31″W
- Type: Reservoir, man-made construction: earth and concrete date: March 1930
- Primary inflows: Sacandaga River
- Primary outflows: Sacandaga River
- Catchment area: 1,044 sq mi (2,700 km^{2})
- Basin countries: United States
- Max. length: 29 mi (47 km)
- Max. width: 5 mi (8.0 km) at its widest point
- Surface area: 20,650 acres (32.27 sq mi; 83.6 km^{2})
- Average depth: 32 ft (9.8 m)
- Max. depth: 70 ft (21 m)
- Water volume: 29.920 billion cubic feet (847.2 hm^{3}) low: 7.800 billion cubic feet (220.9 hm^{3})
- Shore length^{1}: 66 mi (106 km)
- Surface elevation: 771.0 ft (235.0 m) low: 740.0 ft (225.6 m)
- ^{1} Shore length is not a well-defined measure.

The Great Sacandaga Lake (formerly the Sacandaga Reservoir) is a large lake in the Adirondack Park in northern New York in the United States. The lake has a surface area of about 41.7 square miles (108 km^{2}) at capacity, and the length is about 29 miles (47 km). The word Sacandaga means "Land of the Waving Grass" in the native Mohawk language. The lake is in the northern parts of Fulton County and Saratoga County near the southern border of the Adirondack Park. A small portion also extends northward into southern Hamilton County. The broader, south end of the lake is northeast of the City of Johnstown and the City of Gloversville. Great Sacandaga Lake is a reservoir created by damming the Sacandaga River. The primary purpose for the creation of the reservoir was to control flooding on the Hudson River and the Sacandaga River, floods which had a historically significant impact on the surrounding communities.

== History ==
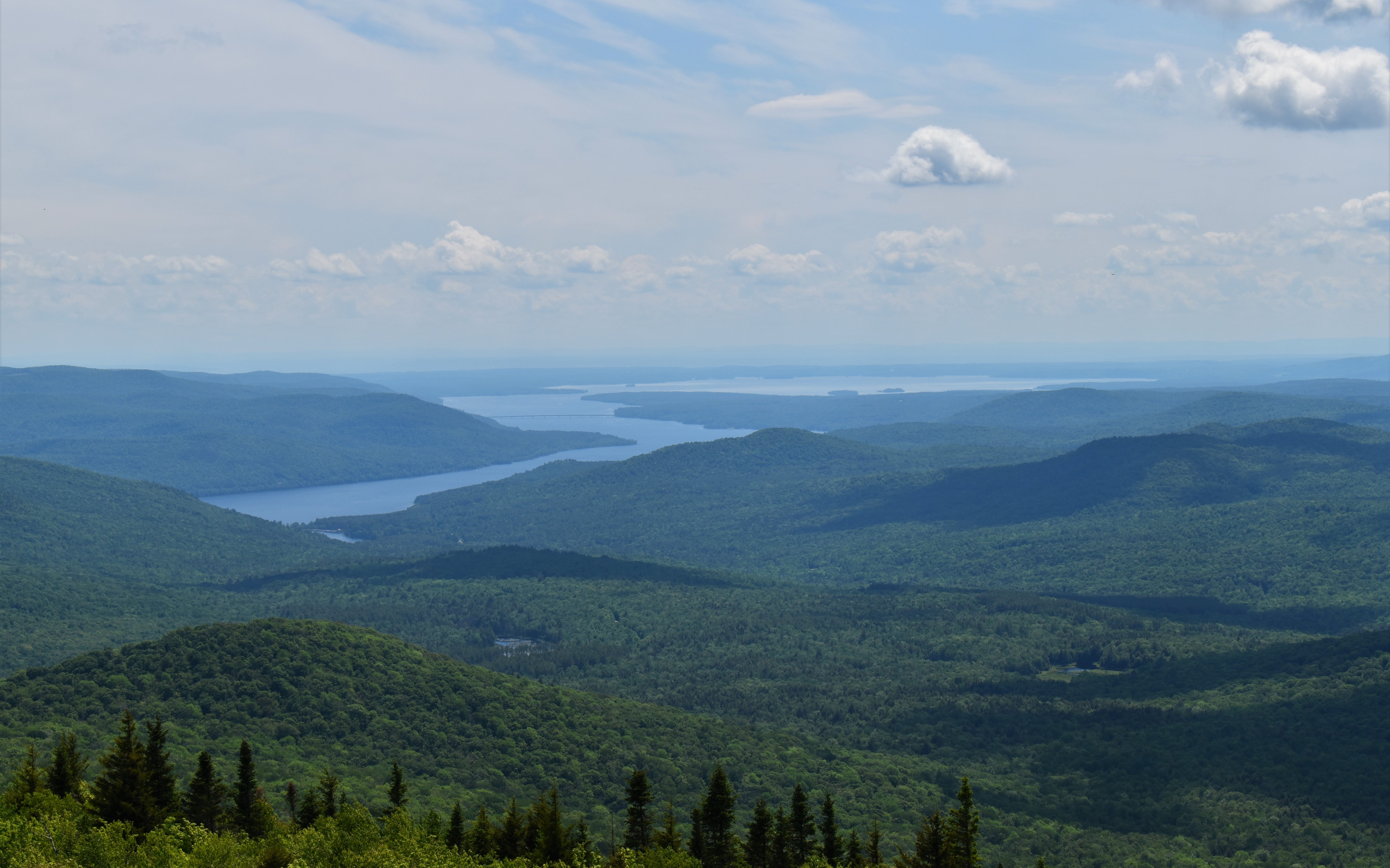
Great Sacandaga Lake from Hadley Mountain Fire Observation Station

Damming the Sacandaga River had been proposed repeatedly throughout the late 19th century. Only after several large floods impacted downstream communities, such as the city of Albany, was there a serious and concerted effort by the state to explore flood control. A public benefit corporation was established to study the feasibility of the dam and later adopted a resolution proposing the dam in 1924. Construction began in the 1920s and completed in March 1930, at a cost of $12 million. The dam was built at Conklingville in the Town of Day, Saratoga County. Four covered bridges and a steel railroad bridge were removed or destroyed. A new 3,075 feet (937 m) bridge consisting of 21 steel spans was constructed at Batchellerville. This 1930 bridge was replaced in 2012.

Land speculation flourished as the plan to control the river and flood a large expanse of land leaked out. Many people chose to remove houses and buildings to new sites outside of the flood zone. Many isolated farms were flooded as well as all or part of ten communities (Batchellerville, Fish House, Osborne Bridge, The Vly, Cranberry Creek, Sacandaga Park, Town of Day, Conklingville, Munsonville and Benedict). 1100 people were forced out of their homes and twenty four cemeteries holding 3,872 graves were moved. Anything left behind as the dam neared completion was burned.

The new body of water was initially called a "reservoir," but in the 1960s it was renamed the Great Sacandaga Lake in an effort to promote tourism to the area. The reservoir is managed by the Hudson River–Black River Regulating District. Today, the local businesses benefit not only from the flood protection provided by the lake, but also from the tourist attraction and the resulting economy that the lake has created in the area. People not only come from many local cities and towns to visit the lake for recreation, but also from other areas of the state, New England, and New Jersey. Many local and out-of-state residents are not only visitors, but also come to the lake to stay in their summer camps and second homes. Public access to the lake is via the many public boat launches, public beaches, and campgrounds that are on the shores of the lake.

Although the lake and some lands surrounding it are owned by New York State, no public money is used to manage the reservoir. About 70% of the District's revenues come from lease agreements with electrical power companies who run the hydroelectric turbines in the dam.

On the south shore is the David Rayfiel House, listed on the National Register of Historic Places in 2009.

The Northern Pike that is recognized as the North American record fish of that species at 46 lbs. 2 oz (20.9 kg), was caught in the reservoir on September 15, 1940 by Peter Dubuc.

== Operation ==
Hudson River–Black River Regulating District

- Location: Lat 43°18'57", long 73°55'39" (North American Datum of 1927), Saratoga County, NY, Hydrologic Unit 02020002, 800 ft upstream from right end of Conklingville Dam on Sacandaga River at Conklingville.
- Period of record: January 1930 to current year. Prior to October 1969, published as "Sacandaga Reservoir at Conklingville".
- Gage: Water-stage recorder. Datum of gage is NGVD of 1929, adjustment of 1912.

== Fishing ==
Fish species present in the lake are walleye, northern pike, smallmouth bass, rock bass, smelt, brown trout, yellow perch, landlocked salmon, pumpkinseed sunfish, and brown bullhead. There are four different access sites, including: a state owned hard surface ramp boat launch on NY-30, in the village of Northville; a state owned hard surface ramp boat launch at the Northampton Beach Campground near NY-30, 1.5 miles (2.4 km) south of the village of Northville; a state owned hard surface ramp boat launch off County Route 110, 3 miles (4.8 km) northeast of the village of Broadalbin; and a state owned hard surface ramp boat launch on North Shore Road, 5 miles (8.0 km) north of the hamlet of Edinburgh.

== Gallery ==
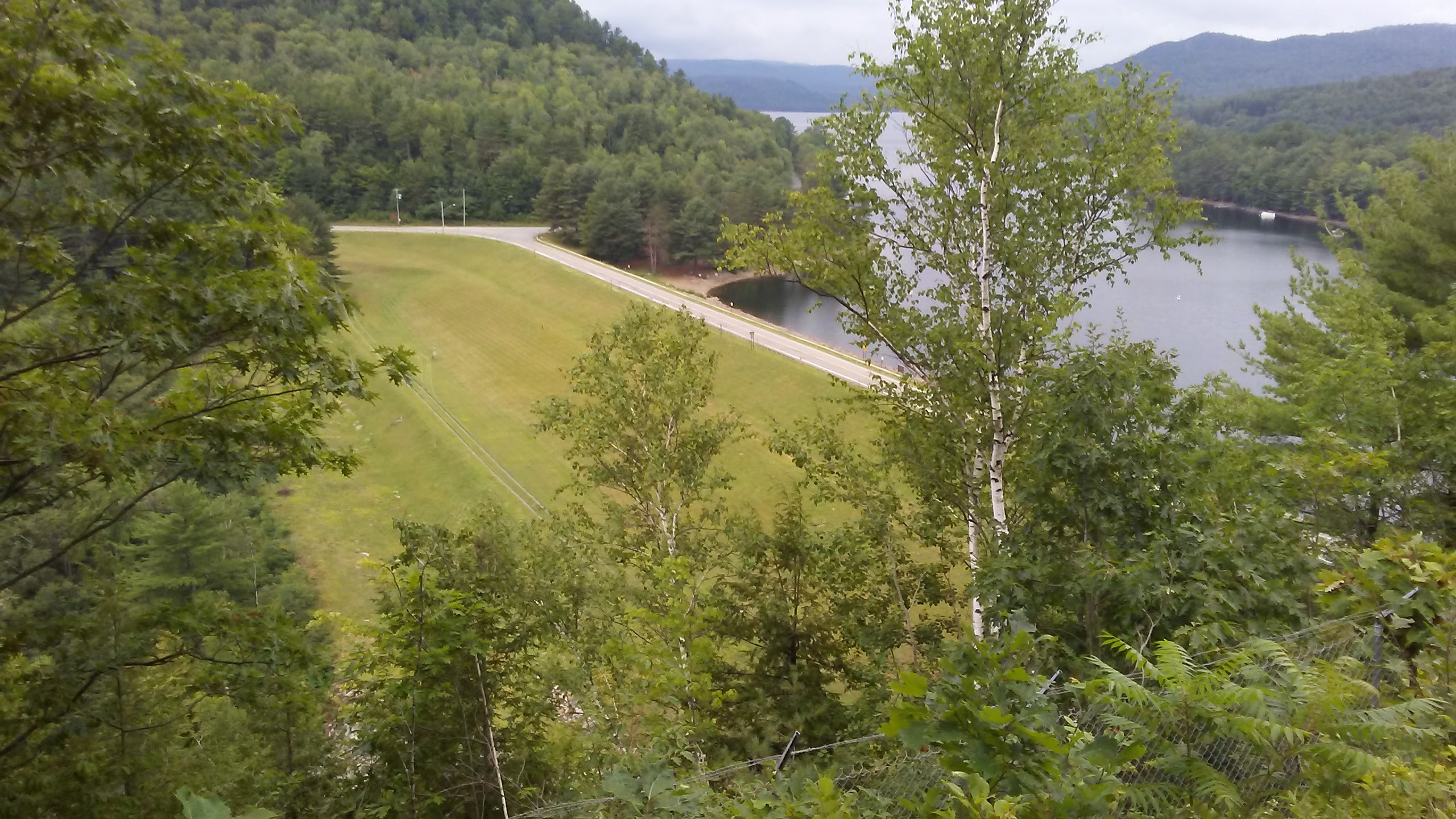
The Conklingville Dam

The lake at sunset

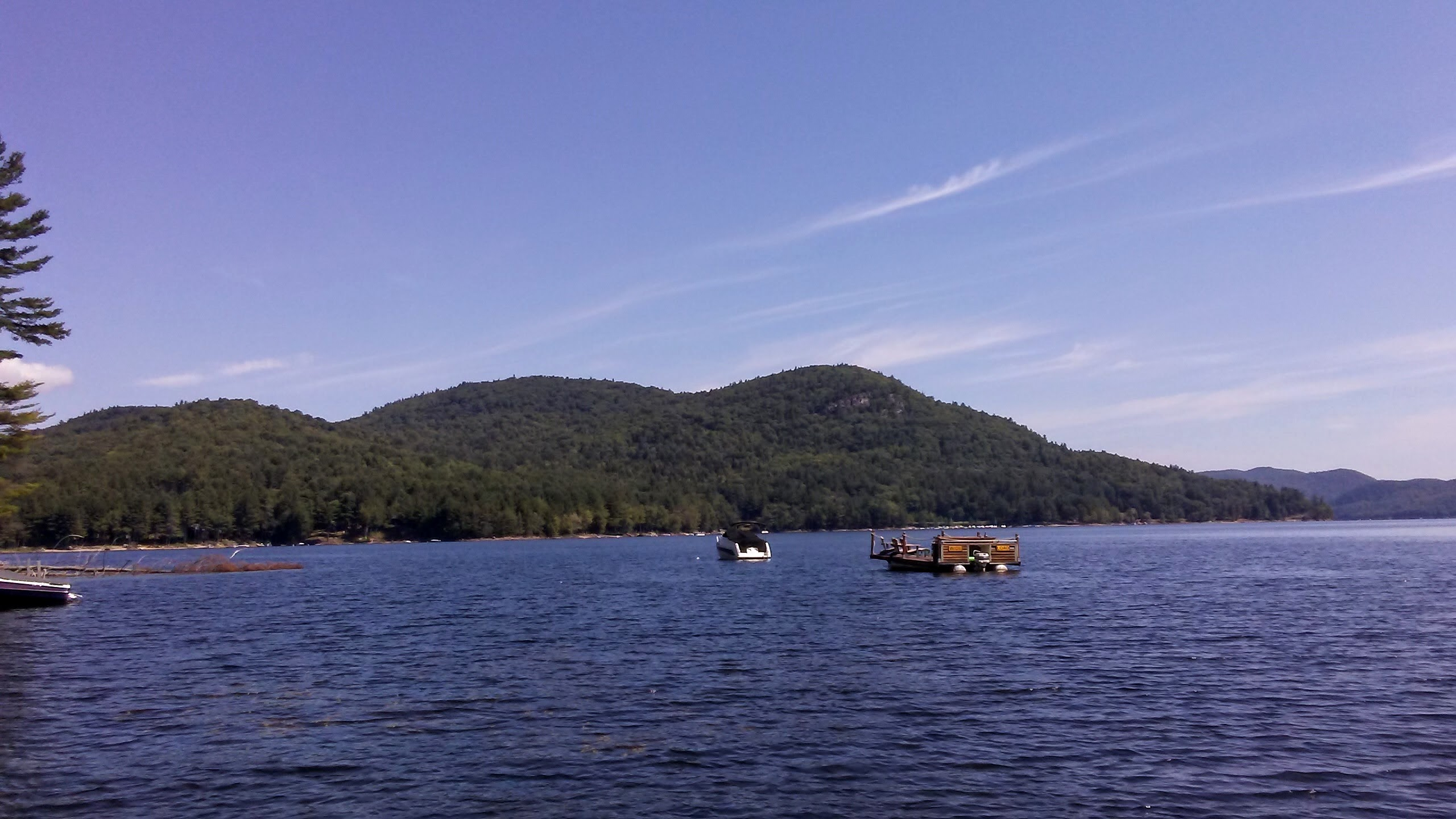
The narrow section of the lake

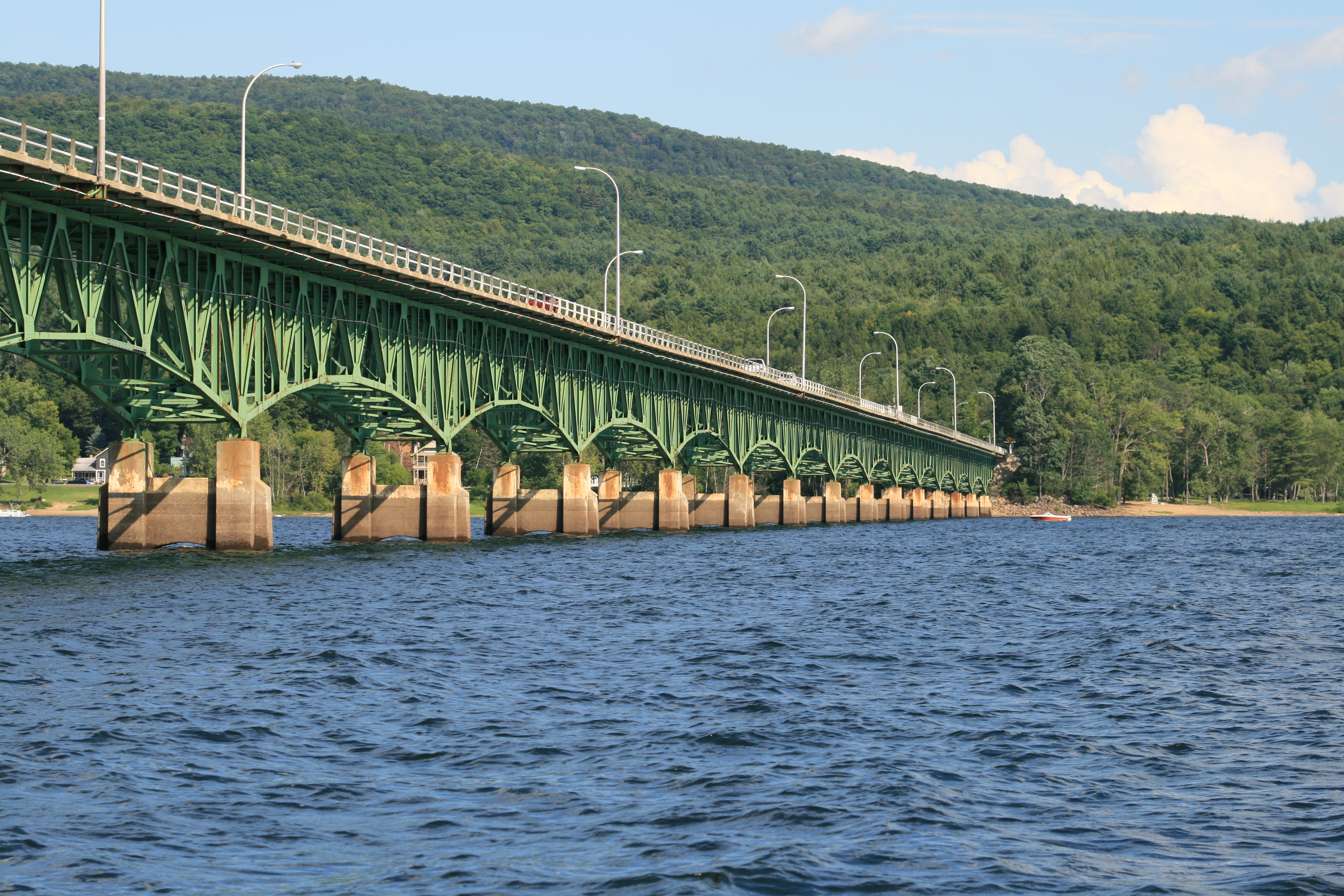
The old bridge

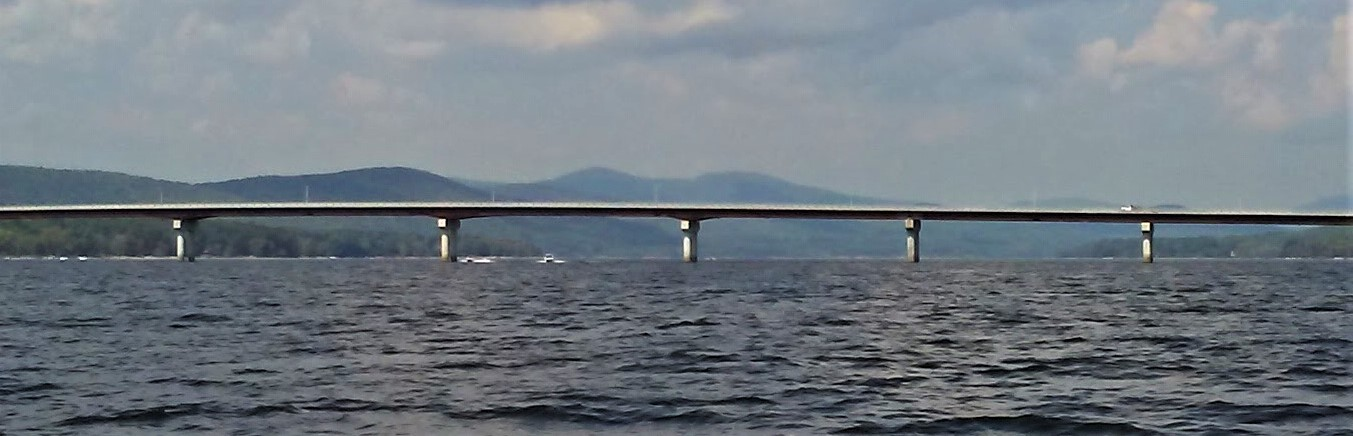
The new bridge

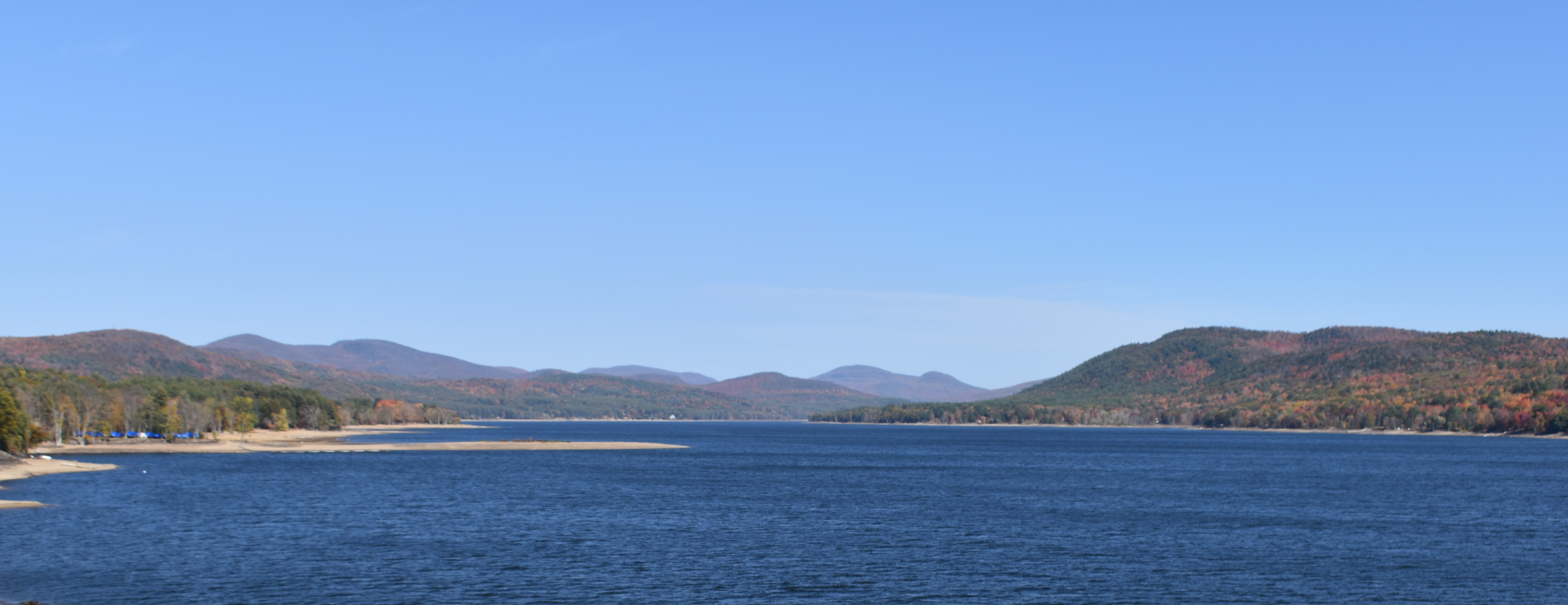
View from new bridge

== See also ==
- List of reservoirs and dams in New York
