= Hadley, New York =

Hadley
- Town
- Town of Hadley
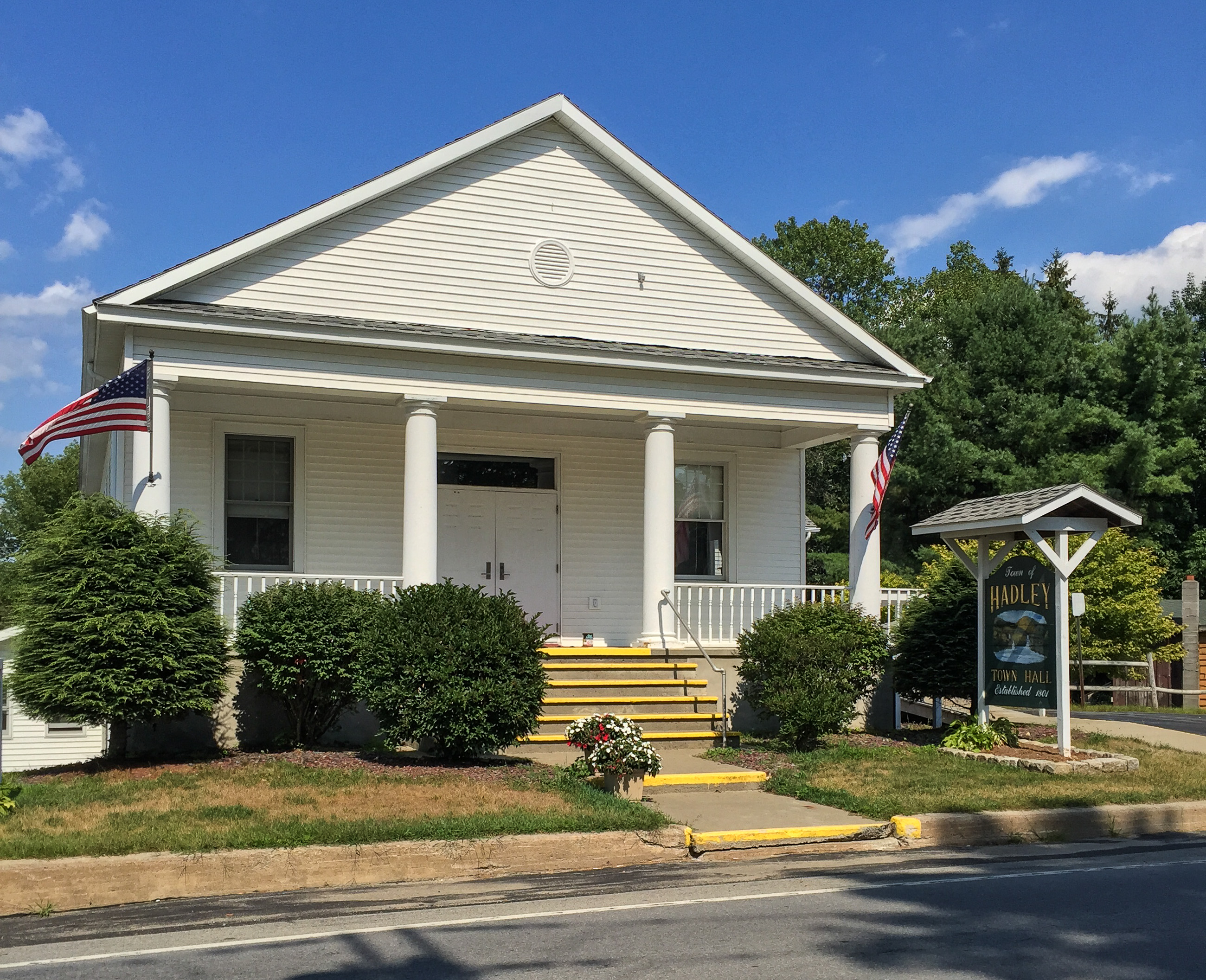
- Hadley Town Hall
- Motto: Where the Great Sacandaga meets the mighty Hudson
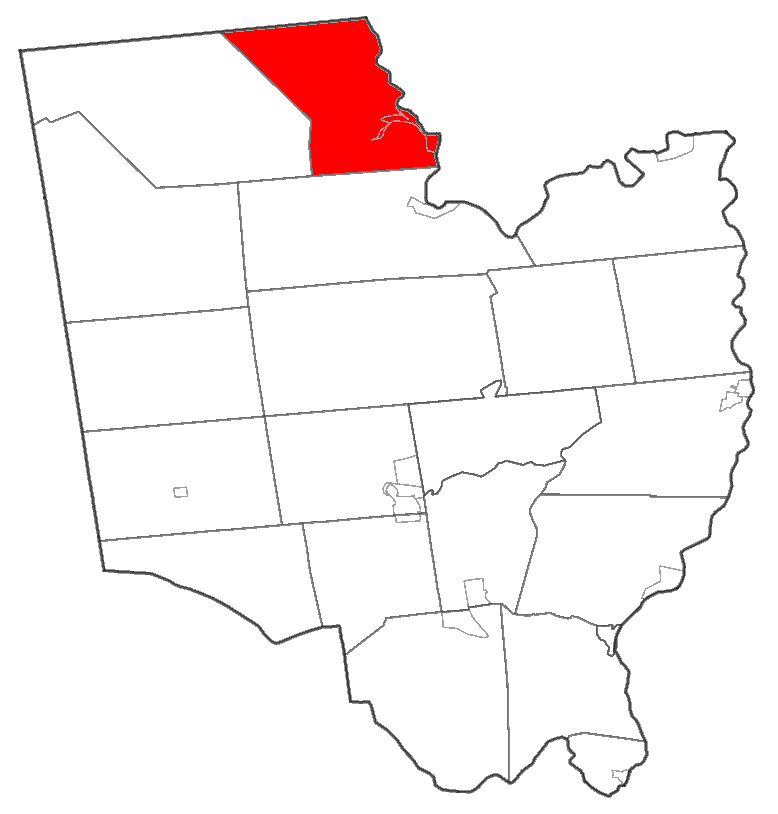
- Map highlighting Hadley's location within Saratoga County.

- Location within the state of New York
- Coordinates: 43°19′6″N 73°52′11″W
- Country: United States
- State: New York
- County: Saratoga
- Named for: Hadley, Massachusetts

Area
  - Total: 41.09 sq mi (106.41 km^{2})
  - Land: 39.70 sq mi (102.83 km^{2})
  - Water: 1.38 sq mi (3.57 km^{2})
- Elevation: 1,578 ft (481 m)

Population (2020)
  - Total: 1,976
  - Density: 49.77/sq mi (19.22/km^{2})
- Time zone: UTC-5 (Eastern (EST))
  - Summer (DST): UTC-4 (EDT)
- ZIP code: 12835
- Area code: 518
- FIPS code: 36-31269
- GNIS feature ID: 0979032
- Website: Town website

Hadley (/ˈhædliː/, HAD-lee) is a town in Saratoga County, New York, United States. The population was 1,971 at the 2000 census. The town was named after Hadley, Massachusetts.

The Town of Hadley is in the northern part of the county and is west of Glens Falls.

== History ==
The first settler arrived around 1788.

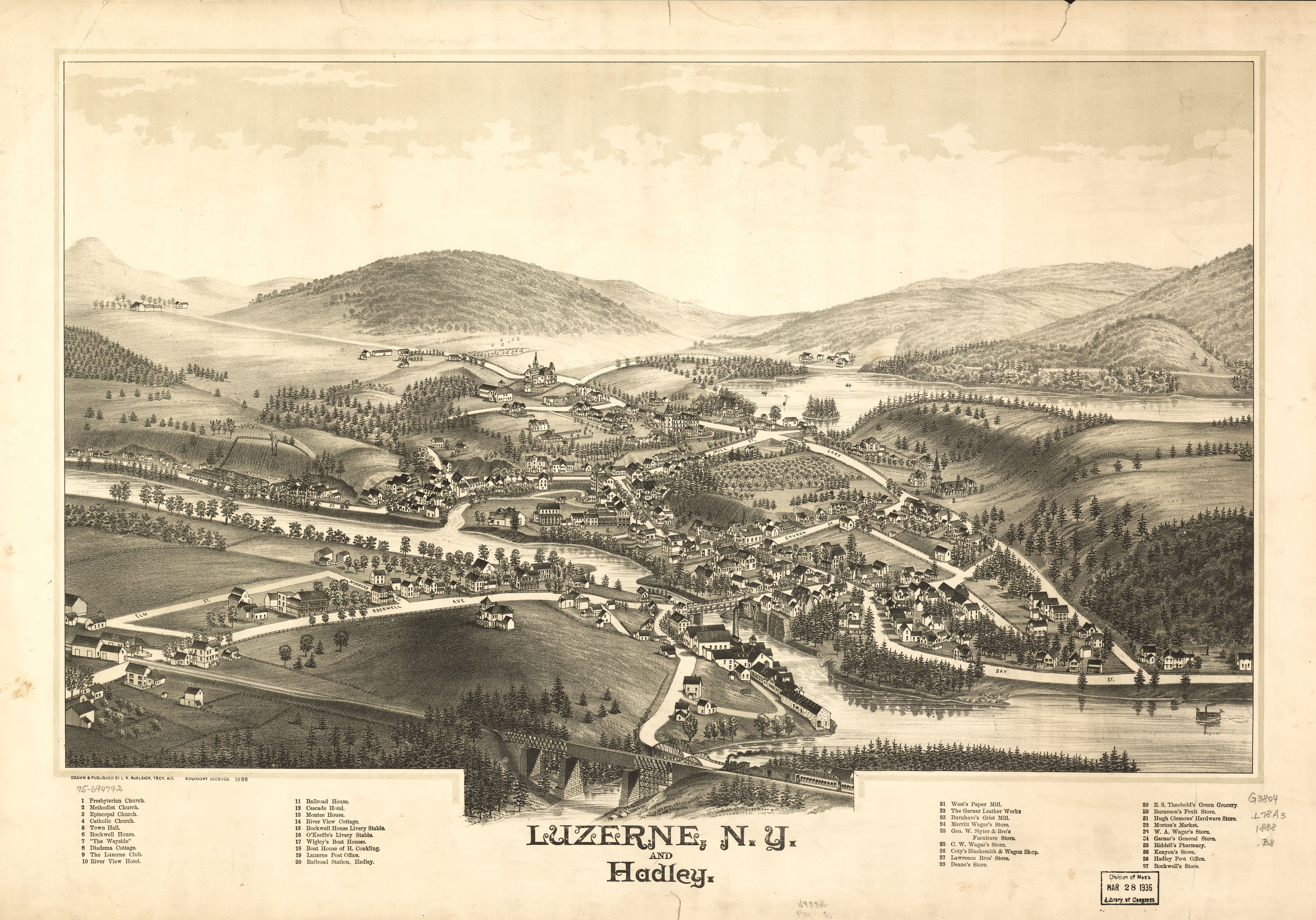
Perspective map of Luzerne (now Lake Luzerne, New York) and Hadley from 1888 with list of landmarks by L.R. Burleigh

The town was formed from parts of the Towns of Greenfield and Northumberland in 1801. The Town of Corinth was taken from Hadley in 1818, and the Town of Day was removed in 1819, bringing the Town of Hadley to its current dimensions.

In 1930, the Conklingville Dam by the west town line helped create the Sacandaga Reservoir and controlled flooding.

The Hadley Mountain Fire Observation Station and Hadley Parabolic Bridge are listed on the National Register of Historic Places.

== Geography ==
According to the United States Census Bureau, the town has a total area of 41.1 square miles (106 km^{2}), of which 39.8 square miles (103 km^{2}) is land and 1.3 square miles (3.4 km^{2}) (3.26%) is water.

The town is located within the Adirondack Park. The northern and eastern town lines are the border of Warren County.

A small part of the eastern end of the Great Sacandaga Lake (formerly the "Sacandaga Reservoir") is by the western town line and the Sacandaga River divides the town laterally and enters the Hudson River by the eastern town boundary.

New York State Route 9N passes through the southeastern part of Hadley.

== Demographics ==
Historical population
Census	Pop.	Note	%±
1810	1,725		—
1820	798		−53.7%
1830	829		3.9%
1840	865		4.3%
1850	1,003		16.0%
1860	1,017		1.4%
1870	1,039		2.2%
1880	1,095		5.4%
1890	1,103		0.7%
1900	914		−17.1%
1910	672		−26.5%
1920	581		−13.5%
1930	841		44.8%
1940	679		−19.3%
1950	801		18.0%
1960	982		22.6%
1970	1,128		14.9%
1980	1,351		19.8%
1990	1,628		20.5%
2000	1,971		21.1%
2010	2,048		3.9%
2020	1,796		−12.3%
U.S. Decennial Census

As of the census of 2000, there were 1,971 people, 730 households, and 538 families residing in the town. The population density was 49.6 inhabitants per square mile (19.2/km^{2}). There were 990 housing units at an average density of 24.9 per square mile (9.6/km^{2}). The racial makeup of the town was 97.77% White, 1.01% African American, 0.20% Native American, 0.15% Asian, 0.05% from other races, and 0.81% from two or more races. Hispanic or Latino of any race were 0.15% of the population.

There were 730 households, out of which 35.1% had children under the age of 18 living with them, 57.8% were married couples living together, 10.4% had a female householder with no husband present, and 26.3% were non-families. 19.3% of all households were made up of individuals, and 7.8% had someone living alone who was 65 years of age or older. The average household size was 2.67 and the average family size was 3.04.

In the town, the population was spread out, with 26.2% under the age of 18, 8.0% from 18 to 24, 29.5% from 25 to 44, 22.4% from 45 to 64, and 13.9% who were 65 years of age or older. The median age was 37 years. For every 100 females, there were 99.1 males. For every 100 females age 18 and over, there were 95.7 males.

The median income for a household in the town was $38,150, and the median income for a family was $42,438. Males had a median income of $35,694 versus $21,810 for females. The per capita income for the town was $17,560. About 6.1% of families and 9.2% of the population were below the poverty line, including 11.9% of those under age 18 and 9.9% of those age 65 or over.

== Communities and locations in Hadley ==
- Bell Brook Pond – A small artificial lake by the western town line.
- Hadley – The hamlet of Hadley is near the eastern town line and the mouth of the Sacandaga River at the junction of County Roads 1 and 4.
- Lynnwood – A hamlet in the western part of the town at the junction of County Roads 7 and 8.
- Mount Anthony – The highest peak in the town, in its southeastern corner.
- Rockwell Falls – A waterfall by Hadley village.
- Stewart Bridge Reservoir – A reservoir on the Sacandaga River.
- Stewart's Dam – An earthen dam on the Sacandaga River, creating Stewart Bridge Reservoir.
