= Day, New York =

Day
- Town
- Town of Day
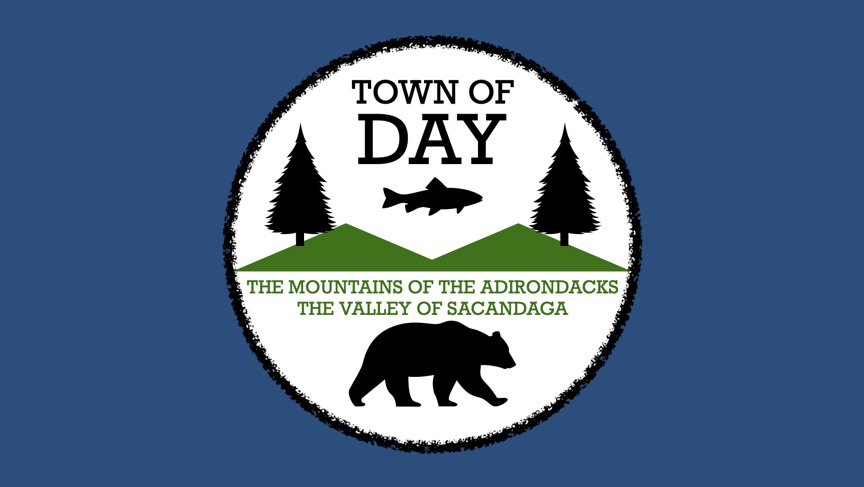
- Flag

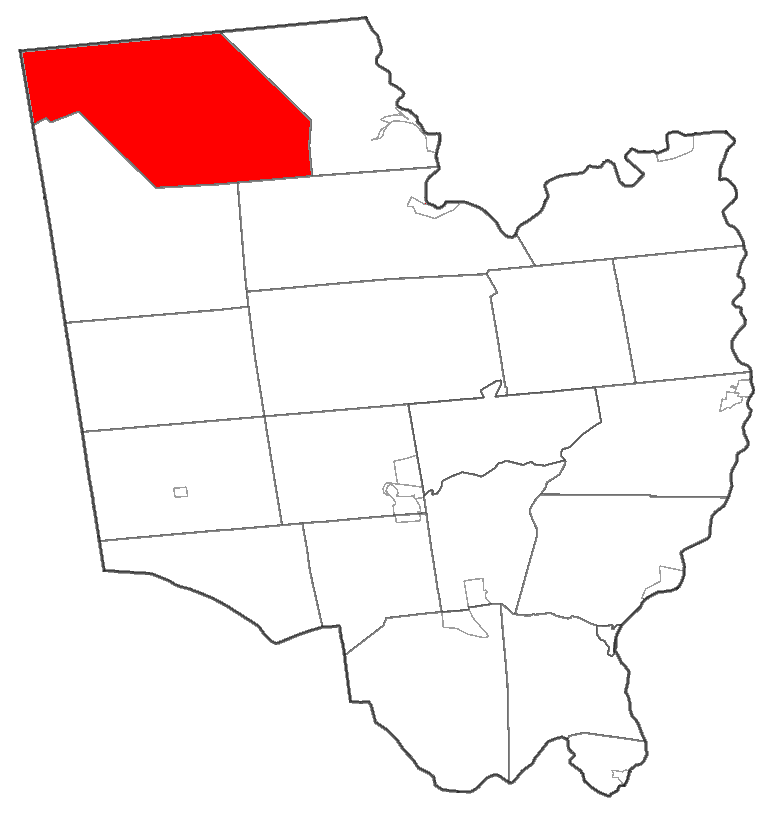
- Map highlighting Day's location within Saratoga County.

- Location within the state of New York
- Coordinates: 43°18′8″N 74°0′37″W
- Country: United States
- State: New York
- County: Saratoga

Area
  - Total: 69.53 sq mi (180.09 km^{2})
  - Land: 64.11 sq mi (166.05 km^{2})
  - Water: 5.42 sq mi (14.04 km^{2})
- Elevation: 873 ft (266 m)

Population (2020)
  - Total: 819
  - Density: 12.8/sq mi (4.93/km^{2})
- Time zone: UTC-5 (Eastern (EST))
  - Summer (DST): UTC-4 (EDT)
- ZIP code: 12835
- Area code: 518
- FIPS code: 36-19807
- GNIS feature ID: 0978888

Day is a town in Saratoga County, New York, United States. The town is in the northwestern part of the county and is northeast of Amsterdam. Its population in the 2020 Census was 819.

Day is located inside the Adirondack Park.

== History ==
The town was first settled around 1797.

The town was formed in 1819 from parts of the Towns of Edinburg and Hadley. The original name of the town was "Concord." Part of the town was flooded in 1930 when the Conklingville dam created the Sacandaga Reservoir (now Great Sacandaga Lake). Some of the historic buildings were saved by moving them to higher ground, while others are now under the surface of the lake.

The David Rayfiel House was listed on the National Register of Historic Places in 2009.

== Geography ==
According to the United States Census Bureau, the town has a total area of 69.6 square miles (180 km^{2}), of which 64.3 square miles (167 km^{2}) is land and 5.2 square miles (13 km^{2}) (7.53%) is water.

The town borders Great Sacandaga Lake. The northern town line is the county line with Warren County, and the western town boundary is the county line with Hamilton County.

== Demographics ==
Historical population
Census	Pop.	Note	%±
1820	571		—
1830	758		32.7%
1840	942		24.3%
1850	1,045		10.9%
1860	1,209		15.7%
1870	1,127		−6.8%
1880	1,238		9.8%
1890	852		−31.2%
1900	719		−15.6%
1910	628		−12.7%
1920	473		−24.7%
1930	328		−30.7%
1940	475		44.8%
1950	436		−8.2%
1960	466		6.9%
1970	615		32.0%
1980	656		6.7%
1990	746		13.7%
2000	920		23.3%
2010	856		−7.0%
2020	819		−4.3%
U.S. Decennial Census

As of the census of 2000, there were 920 people, 382 households, and 275 families residing in the town. The population density was 14.3 inhabitants per square mile (5.5/km^{2}). There were 1,507 housing units at an average density of 23.4 per square mile (9.0/km^{2}). The racial makeup of the town was 98.26% White, 0.11% Asian, 0.65% from other races, and 0.98% from two or more races. Hispanic or Latino of any race were 0.43% of the population.

There were 382 households, out of which 26.4% had children under the age of 18 living with them, 61.5% were married couples living together, 6.3% had a female householder with no husband present, and 28.0% were non-families. 23.6% of all households were made up of individuals, and 10.2% had someone living alone who was 65 years of age or older. The average household size was 2.41 and the average family size was 2.80.

In the town, the population was spread out, with 22.2% under the age of 18, 6.0% from 18 to 24, 25.5% from 25 to 44, 30.7% from 45 to 64, and 15.7% who were 65 years of age or older. The median age was 43 years. For every 100 females, there were 104.4 males. For every 100 females age 18 and over, there were 101.7 males.

The median income for a household in the town was $36,131, and the median income for a family was $38,281. Males had a median income of $32,375 versus $30,357 for females. The per capita income for the town was $17,949. About 14.4% of families and 19.1% of the population were below the poverty line, including 32.9% of those under age 18 and 12.0% of those age 65 or over.

== Communities and locations in Day ==
- Allentown – A hamlet by the eastern town line and north of Conklingville.
- Conklingville – A hamlet in the southeastern part of the town. It is named after Gurdon Conkling and was once one of the two principal villages in the Town of Hadley.
- Crowville – A former location in the western section of the town.
- Day Center – A hamlet on the northern shore of the Great Sacandaga Lake, located on County Road 4 (North shore Road).
- Lakeview – A hamlet located on the southern side of Great Sacandaga Lake.
- Livingston Lake – A lake by the northern town line.
- Overlook – A hamlet located east of Lakeview.
- Tenant Lake – A lake located west of Livingston Lake.
- Tenant Mountain – An elevation west of Tenant Lake. It is the highest point in Saratoga County.
- Abeling Lane – A small community on the North Shore Road.
