= Red Raiders =

Red Raiders can refer to sports teams or bands at:

== Germany ==
- Kaiserslautern High School, in Kaiserslautern, Germany

== United States ==
=== University ===
- Northwestern College (Iowa), Orange City, Iowa
- Texas Tech Red Raiders, Lubbock, Texas

=== High school ===
- Baylor School, Chattanooga, Tennessee
- Bellefonte Area High School, Pennsylvania
- Bellingham High School (Washington), Washington
- Coatesville Area High School, Pennsylvania
- East Side High School (Newark, New Jersey)
- Fitchburg High School, Massachusetts
- Greenville Senior High School (Greenville, South Carolina)
- Jamestown High School (New York)
- Kauai High School, Lihue, Hawaii
- London High School (Ohio), Ohio
- Mechanicville High School, New York
- North Rockland High School, Thiells, New York
- Ocean City High School, New Jersey
- Our Lady of Lourdes Regional School, Coal Township, Pennsylvania
- Paulsboro High School, New Jersey
- South Point High School (North Carolina), Belmont, North Carolina
- Tyler Legacy High School, Texas
- Uniontown Area High School, Pennsylvania
- Wauwatosa East High School, Wisconsin

=== Middle/elementary school ===
- Mabelvale Magnet Middle School, Arkansas
