= Sam Pitcheralle =

American politician

Samuel J. Pitcheralle was the Treasurer of Saratoga County, New York appointed after Christopher Callaghan retired in 2006 to run for New York State Comptroller. He won a full term in office in the 2006 election.

== Education ==
Treasurer Pitcheralle received a Bachelor of Science degree from McGill University in Montreal and holds a certification in accounting from Siena College.

== Political career ==
Treasurer Pitcheralle has worked in finance all his life. He began his political career as Director of Finance for the City of Schenectady from 1985 to 1993. In 1994, Pitcheralle began working as the City Administrator for Mechanicville until 1997. From 1997 until 2006, Pitcheralle served as Deputy Treasurer for Saratoga County. He was appointed as Acting Treasurer in 2006 by Governor George Pataki to fill out the remaining months of the term of Christopher Callaghan, who had retired to pursue a bid for New York State Comptroller. Pitcheralle won a full term as treasurer on November 7, 2006.

== Electoral history ==
2006 Race for Saratoga County Treasurer

  - Samuel J. Pitcheralle (R), 58.3%
  - Preston L Jenkins, Jr (D), 41.7%

2010 Race for Saratoga County Treasurer

  - Samuel J. Pitcheralle (R), 99.7%
  - Write-Ins, 0.2%

| Preceded by Christopher Callaghan | Saratoga County Treasurer; 2006 – 2014 | Succeeded by Andrew Jarosh |
