= HVDC Mechanicville–Schenectady =

Experimental HVDC transmission line in the United States

Coordinates: 42.878056°N 73.679722°W

HVDC Mechanicville–Schenectady was the first experimental HVDC transmission line in the United States. Built in 1932, the circuit traversed 37 kilometres (23 mi) from Mechanicville, New York to Schenectady, New York.

The system used mercury arc rectifiers at a voltage of 20,000 volts and a rated power of 5 MW. The facility was dismantled after World War II.

== Mechanicville - Schenectady HVDC line ==
General Electric built an experimental 15 kV DC transmission system with a maximum transmission rate of 150 kW at their plant in Schenectady. In 1932, a 27.4 kilometres long experimental HVDC line designed for a bipolar voltage of 15 kV and a maximum transmission power of 5 MW from Mechanicville Hydroelectric Plant was built. This system first used mercury arc valves, and then later ignitrons, as the first power electronic devices used for HVDC transmission. The line was in service until 1945 and operated in constant current mode. In 1945 the scheme was dismantled.

This experimental system also demonstrated frequency conversion. The Mechanicville plant generated power at 40 Hz, and the HVDC line transmitted power to the Schenectady 60 Hz system.

== See also ==
- Albert Hull
