= Orie Amodeo =

- Born: Orest Amodeo; March 9, 1921; Mechanicville, New York, U.S.
- Died: December 26, 1998 (aged 77) Culver City, California, U.S.
- Genres: Orchestra, pop
- Instruments: Saxophone, clarinet, flute

Orest "Orie" J. Amodeo (March 9, 1921 – December 26, 1998) was an American musician who was a member of the Lawrence Welk orchestra from 1945 to 1970. His primary instruments were the flute, saxophone and clarinet.

== Early life ==
Amodeo was born in Mechanicville, New York, on March 9, 1921. A self-taught musician from a young age, he learned all the woodwind instruments and the violin from his father, Ferdinand Amodeo. Ferdinand was founder and headed the Amodeo Mechanicvcille City Band, and also was a music teacher, barber, artist, and the father of two children. He attended Mechanicville High School and graduated in 1938.

Prior to playing with the Lawrence Welk orchestra he was a member of the Amodeo City Band in Mechanicville, under his father. He also played for the band at his high school, and as part of a small band at Joyce's Log Cabin, a local tavern and music venue. He moved to Los Angeles with his family in 1951. Amodeo served in the United States Army.

== Career ==
Amodeo joined the Lawrence Welk Orchestra in San Francisco in 1945. He remained with the orchestra until 1970, when he left to form his own band. On television and in movies, Amodeo was the lead reed player for the Lawrence Welk Orchestra.

Amodeo joined the Lawrence Welk Orchestra after receiving a letter from Lawrence Welk in 1945. and invested 25 years with the band. In 1970, the same year Amodeo left the Lawrence Welk orchestra, he also became a stage technician. Unfortunately the United States was in the middle of a depression and few industries would hire full orchestras for their events. Orie was a successful Property Master in the television industry. After an injury on the show, The Price Is Right, he retired from his job as a stage technician in Los Angeles in 1988.

== Personal life ==
He married Gloria Amodeo (née Mucci) on November 7, 1943. Orie and Gloria had two daughters and two sons, Lois Ann, Gina Marie, Orie (Rusty), and Robert John. They were married for 55 years, until his death in 1998.
