= Gordon A. Sheehan =

American cartoonist

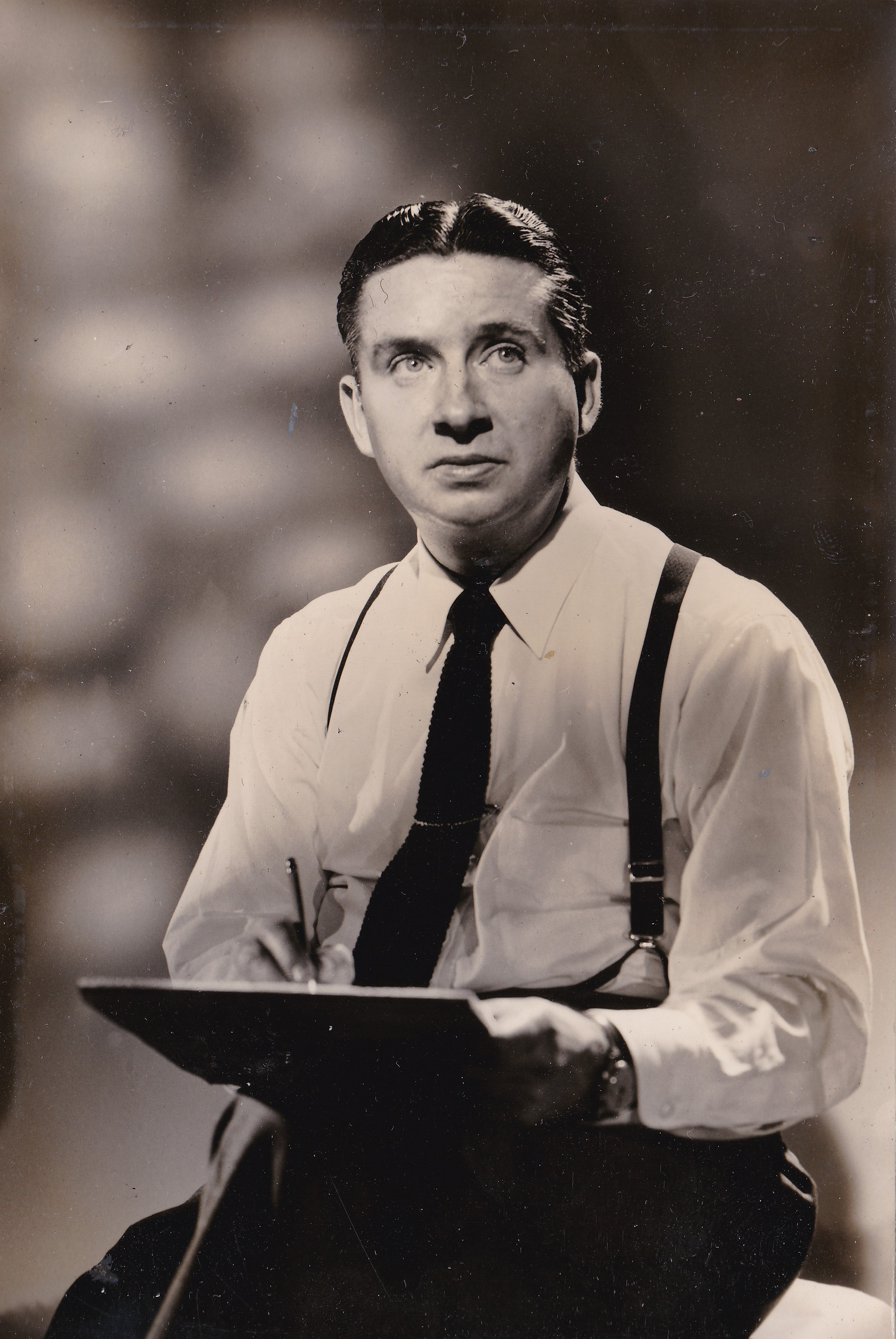
- Born: Gordon Augustine Holland; May 11, 1910; Mechanicville, New York
- Died: September 6, 1996 (aged 86); Illinois
- Resting place: Lake Michigan at Chicago, Illinois
- Education: Pratt Institute
- Occupation: Animator

Gordon A. Sheehan (born Gordon Augustine Holland May 11, 1910 – September 6, 1996), was an American animator and cartoonist. He spent the early part of his career at Fleischer Studios animating notable features such as Betty Boop, Popeye, Superman, and Gulliver's Travels, among other works.

== Early life ==
Born in Mechanicville, New York, he was the seventh of eight children of Patrick and Anna (Hammond) Holland, who were Irish immigrants from county Limerick. After the death of his mother at the age of five, he went to live with a family by the name of Sheehan, whose surname he assumed, although, he was never legally adopted by them.

== Education ==
Sheehan was a 1928 graduate of Mechanicville High School, and received his artistic education at Pratt Institute, graduating in 1932.

== Career ==
Sheehan joined the Fleischer Studio in 1933, where he worked animating various series of cartoon, such as Betty Boop, Popeye and Superman.

Sheehan formed his own studio in 1944 that largely produced animated governmental and educational films, along with cartoons inspired by the work of Rube Goldberg.

Later he was the head of animation at Sound Masters, Inc. and Coronet Films.

After his retirement, Sheehan was an animation professor at Columbia College Chicago, where he taught and inspired notable animator Genndy Tartakovsky. Tartakovsky recalled, “my first [animation] teacher was Gordon Sheehan, he was 90 years old. He was an old Popeye animator, and he was about this high. And I fell in love. I knew that I couldn’t [not] do this for a living, cause he still drew, like, that old Fleischer style in circles, and he was amazing and very inspiring, and I realized I couldn’t not do it.”

Sheehan received a lifetime achievement award from the International Animation Association (Midwest Chapter) and the Official Popeye Fan Club.

He died of heart failure in Chicago on September 6, 1996.
