= St. Paul the Apostle Church (Mechanicville, New York) =

Saint Paul the Apostle Church
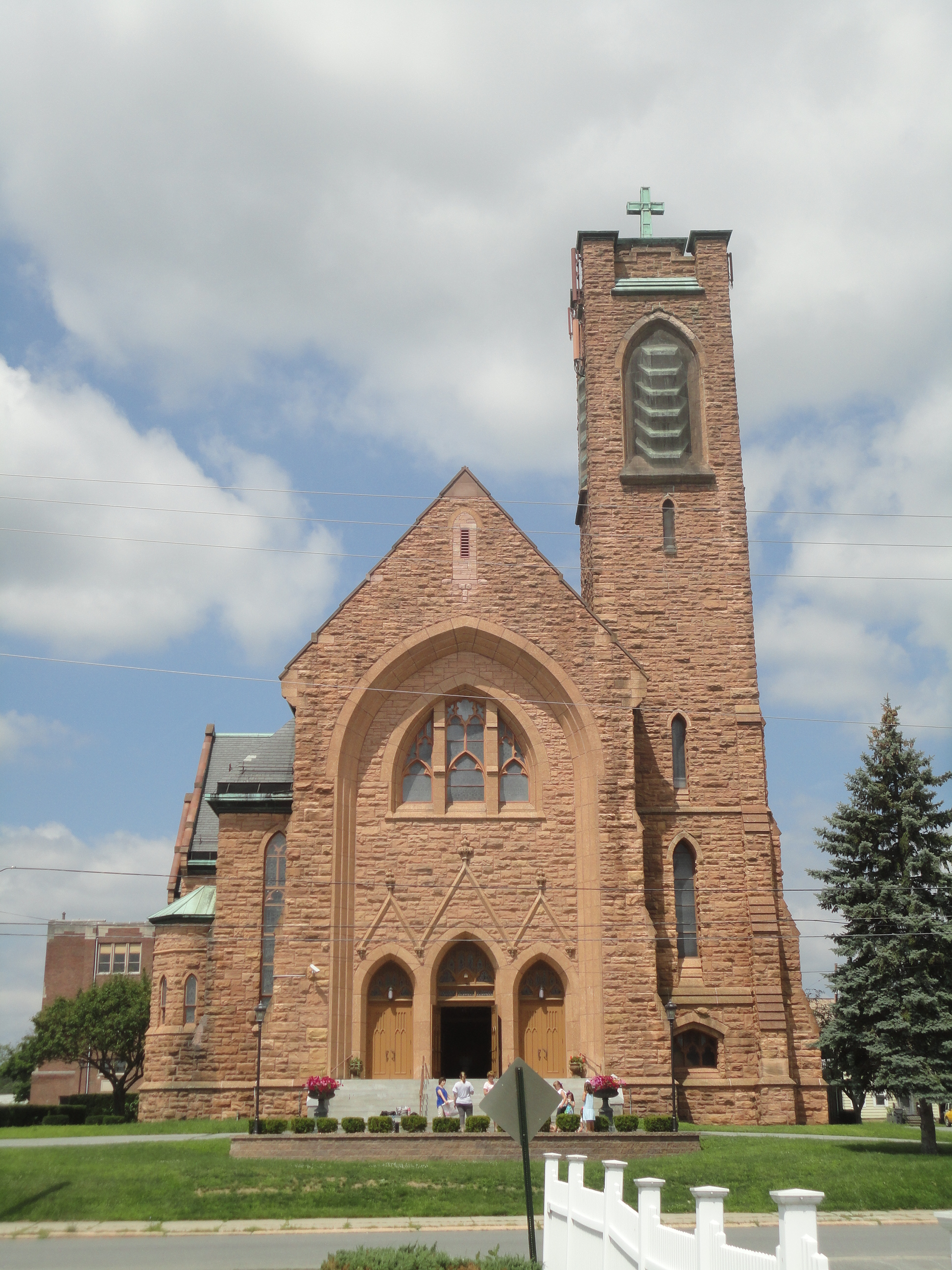

- Location within New York
- 42°54′22.9″N 73°41′4.3″W
- Location: 121 North Main Street; Mechanicville, New York
- Country: United States
- Denomination: Catholic
- Website: All Saints on the Hudson Parish

History
- Founded: 1852 (parish); 1917 (current church)
- Dedicated: October 14, 1917

Architecture
- Functional status: Active
- Architect: Edward W. Loth
- Style: Gothic Revival
- Years built: 1912 - 1917
- Construction cost: $200,000

Administration
- Diocese: Roman Catholic Diocese of Albany
- Parish: All Saints on the Hudson

Clergy
- Bishop: Edward Scharfenberger
- Pastor: Fr. George Fleming

St. Paul the Apostle Church is a historic Catholic church in the city of Mechanicville, New York, United States of America. It is presently part of the parish of All Saints on the Hudson.

== History ==
The church is named for Saint Paul the Apostle. Its cornerstone was laid on Sunday, June 2, 1912, by Bishop Thomas M. A. Burke, and it was dedicated on Sunday, October 14, 1917, by Bishop Thomas F. Cusack.

== Architecture ==
The present edifice was designed in the Gothic revival style by the architect, Edward W. Loth, of Troy, New York. The church is in the cruciform shape, with an overall length of 148', and an overall width of 98' across the transepts. The tower stands at 146', and the front gable stands at 79' from grade to apex.

=== Exterior ===
The church is a steel and masonry structure clad with Potsdam sandstone in a random ashlar pattern. The trim work is of cast stone, made using the crushings of the aforementioned sandstone.

=== Interior ===
The walls are typically of plaster on lath, with a board-and-batten wainscot of oak. The ceiling employs rib vaulting, and is made from plaster, and ornamented with bas-relief with a grapevine and leaf motif. The sanctuary is illuminated by a skylight.

=== Stained Glass Windows ===
The stained glass windows were made by the Pike Glass Studio of Rochester, NY, and are reminiscent of the Munich-style of stained glass. They are typically lancet windows with wood tracery, and depict events from the life of Saint Paul.

=== Stations of the Cross ===
The Stations of the Cross are of plaster, and were made by the Joseph Sibbel Studio of New York City. The niches are highly decorated, and feature a canopy with a central crocketed spire, cusped tracery, and flanking pinnacles. The figures were modeled from live subjects, and are a combination of high and low relief.

== Bell ==
The bell was manufactured by the Meneely & Kimberly foundry of Troy, NY, in the year 1872. It is a bronze bell weighing approximately 1900 lbs. and was moved from the previous edifice to the present church on Tuesday, July 15, 1919. The inscription is in Latin and reads "Uni Trinoque Deo, in Honorem, B. V. M. [Beata Virgo Maria] De Consolatione, SS. Augustini et Monica, Congregatio S. Pauli Apost, Mechanicville, Dicavit, Anno Dni [Domini] 1872 Philippo Izzo, O.S.A. [Ordo Sancti Augustini], Parocho" (in English "To the Triune God, in honor of the Blessed Virgin Mary of Consolation, Saints Augustine and Monica, and the Congregation of Saint Paul the Apostle, Mechanicville, dedicated in the year of our Lord, 1872, by Philip Izzo, Order of Saint Augustine, Pastor").

== Image gallery ==
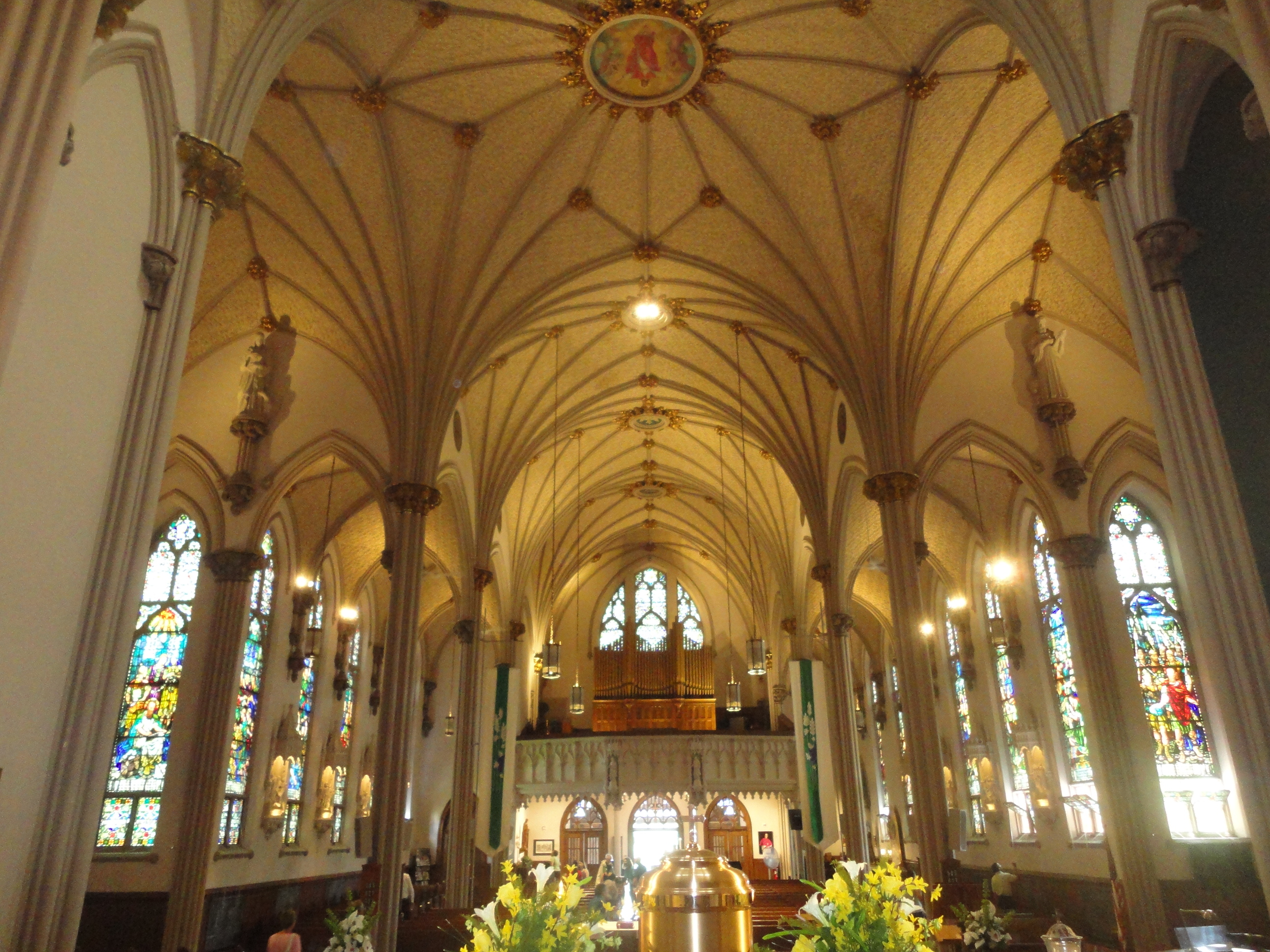
View from the sanctuary, looking East towards narthex

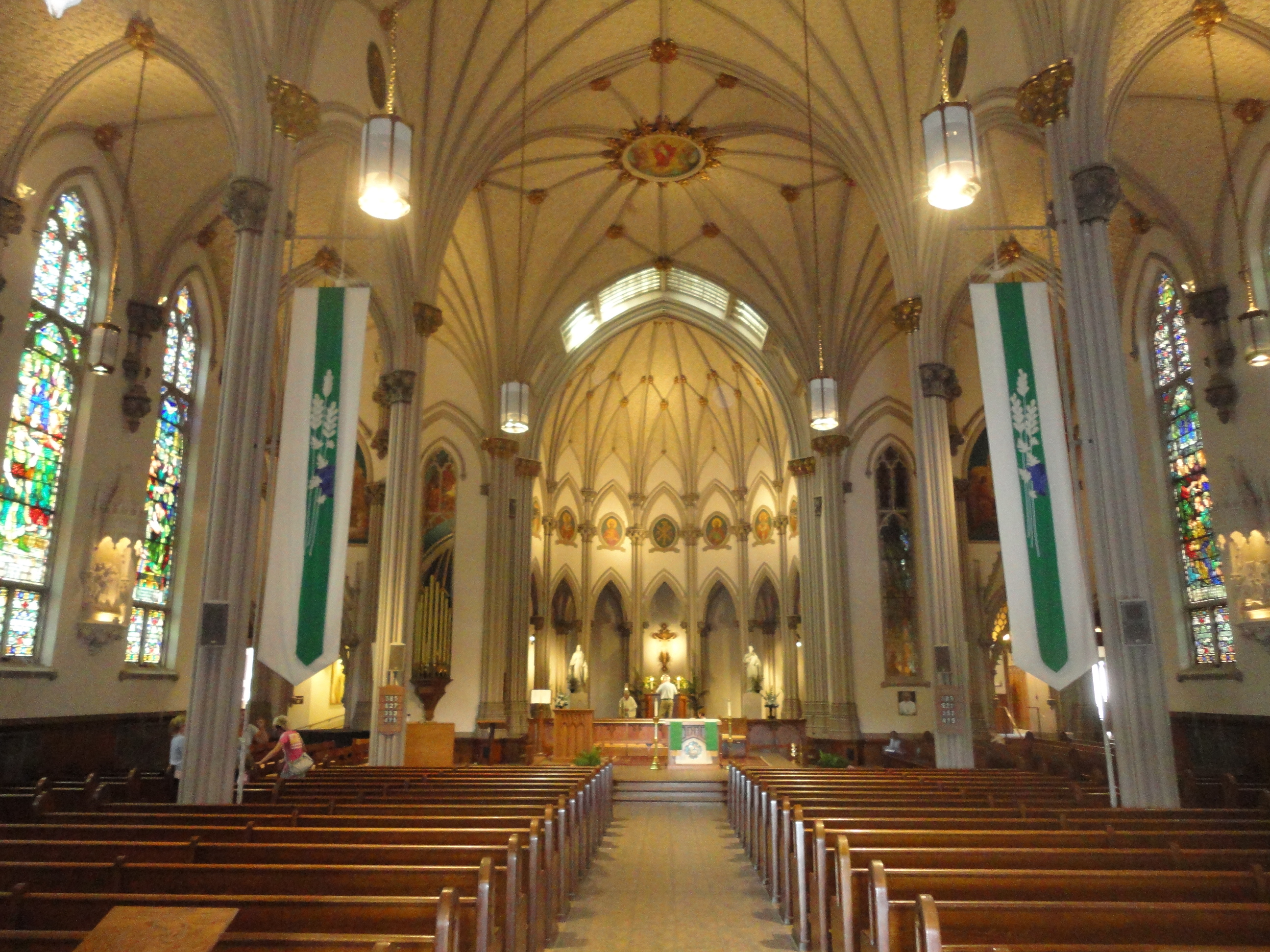
View from narthex, looking west towards sanctuary.

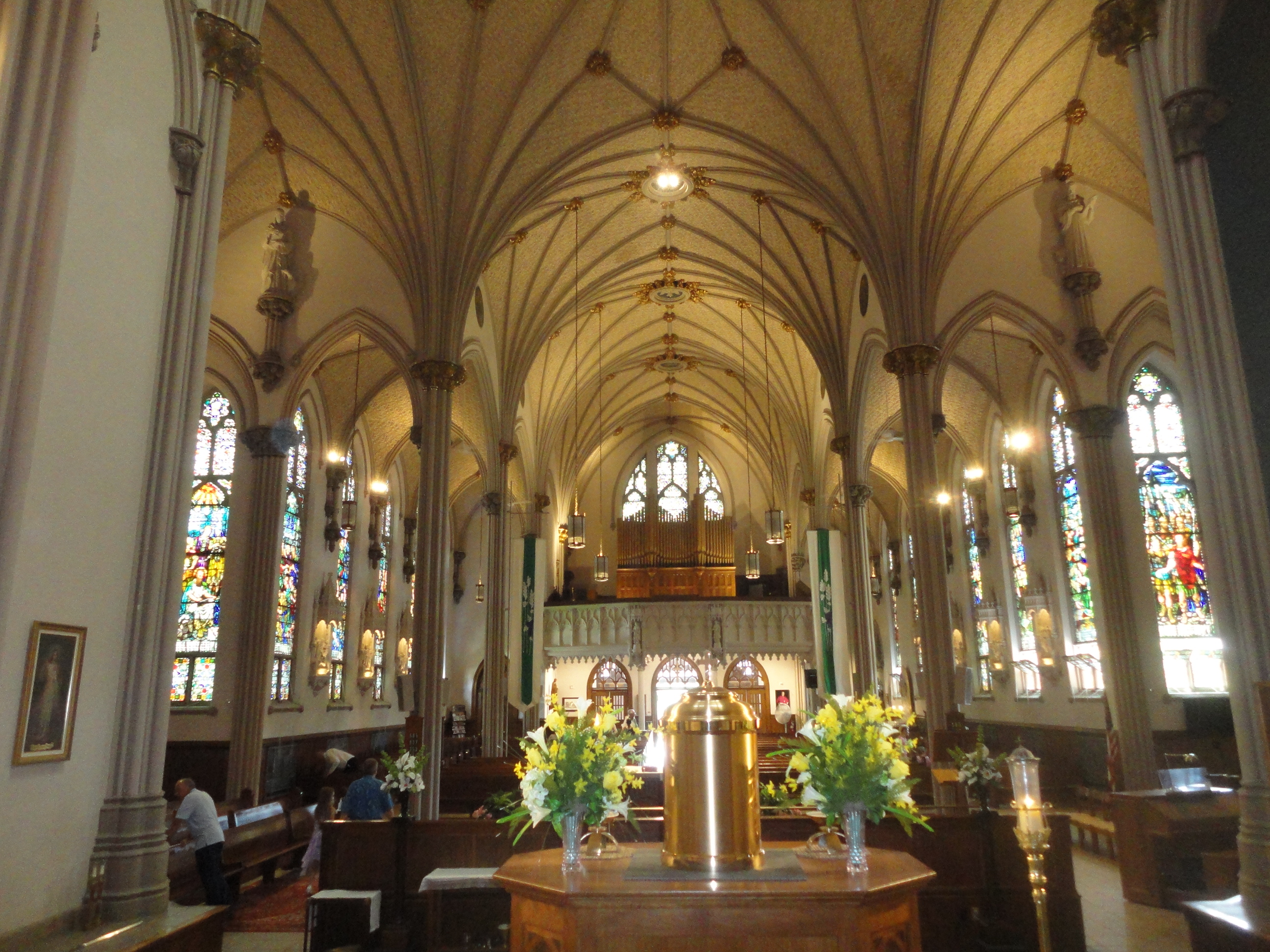
View looking east towards narthex from sanctuary.

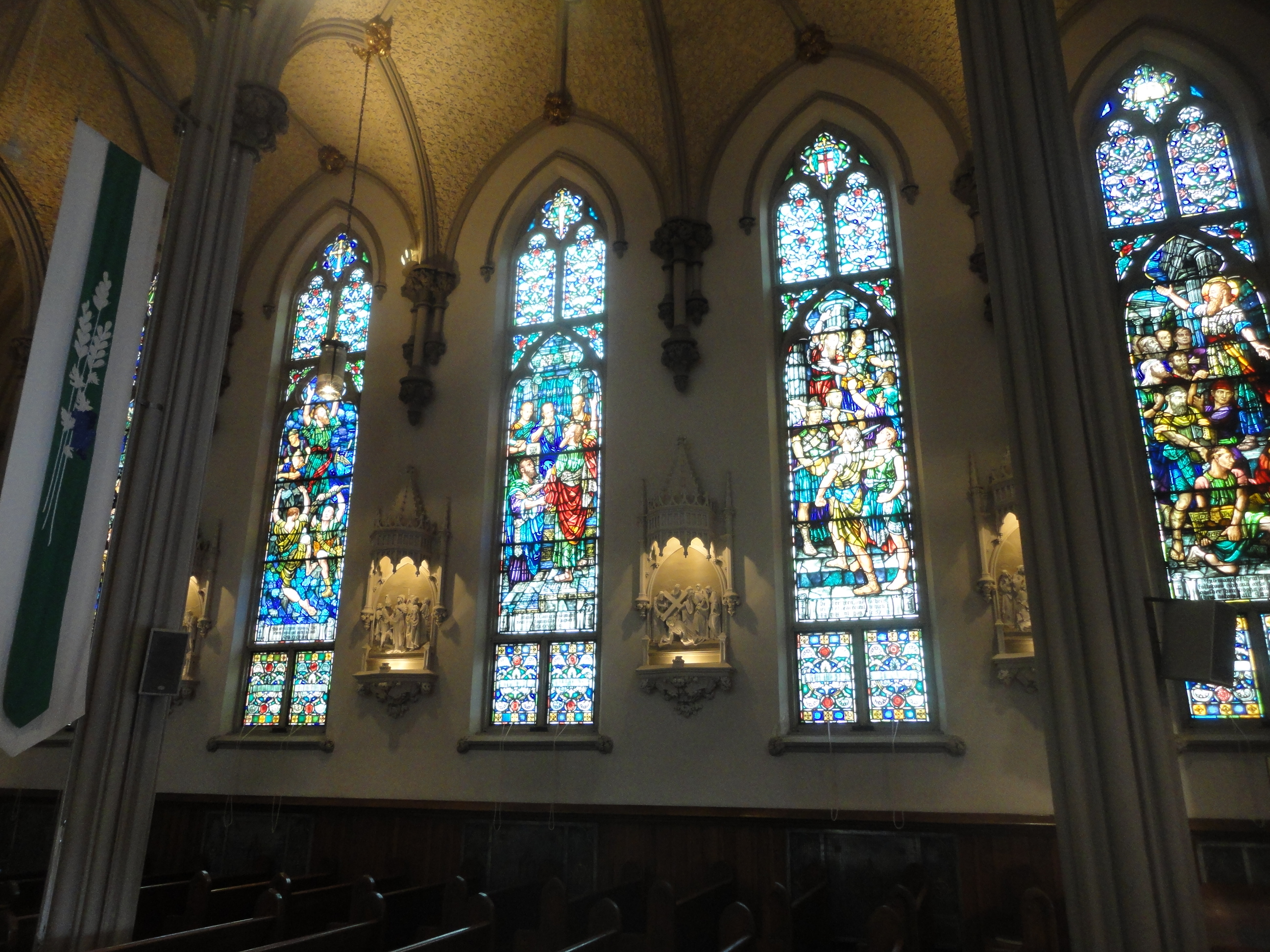
View of stained glass windows in north aisle.

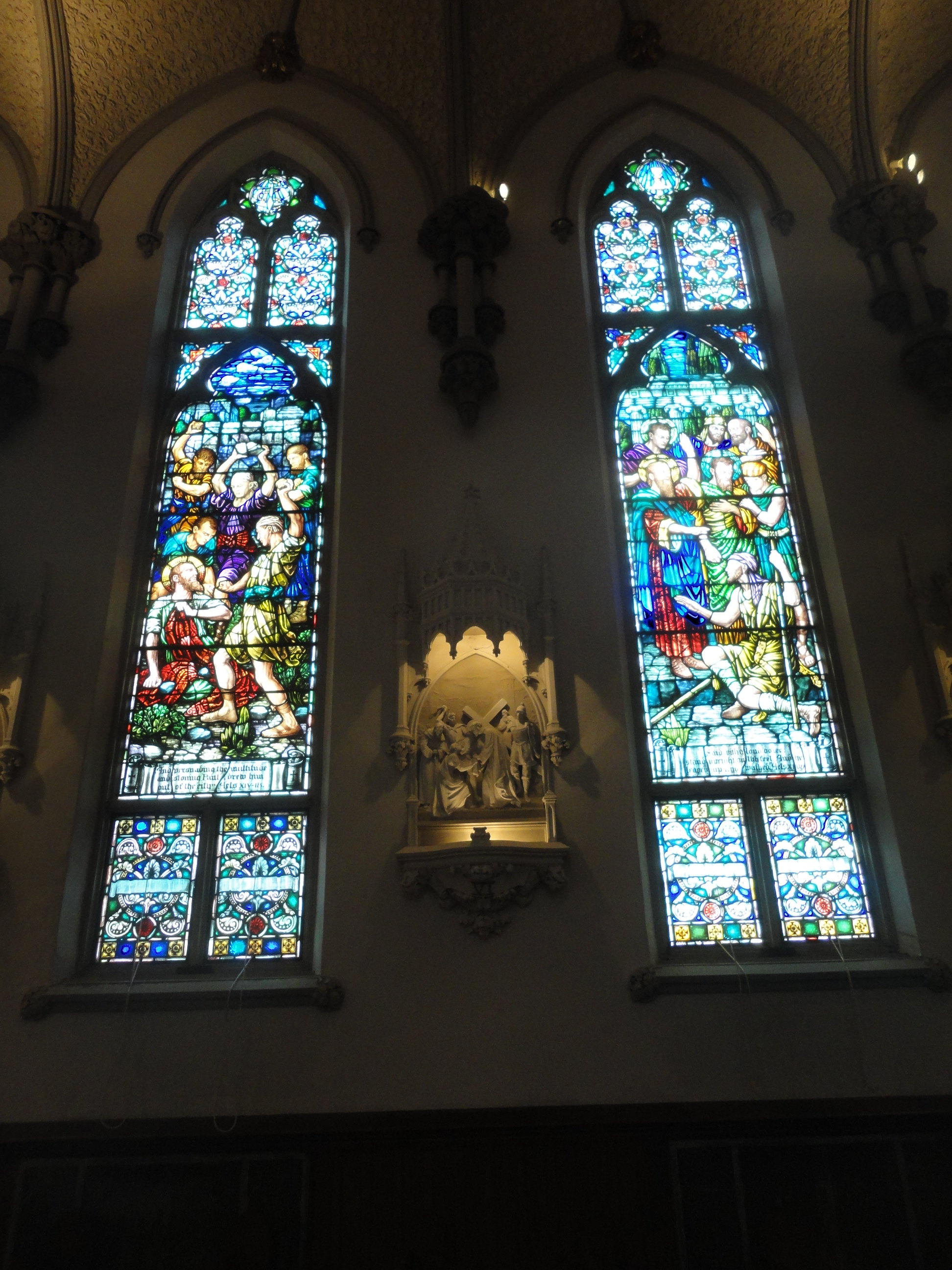
View of typical station of the cross.

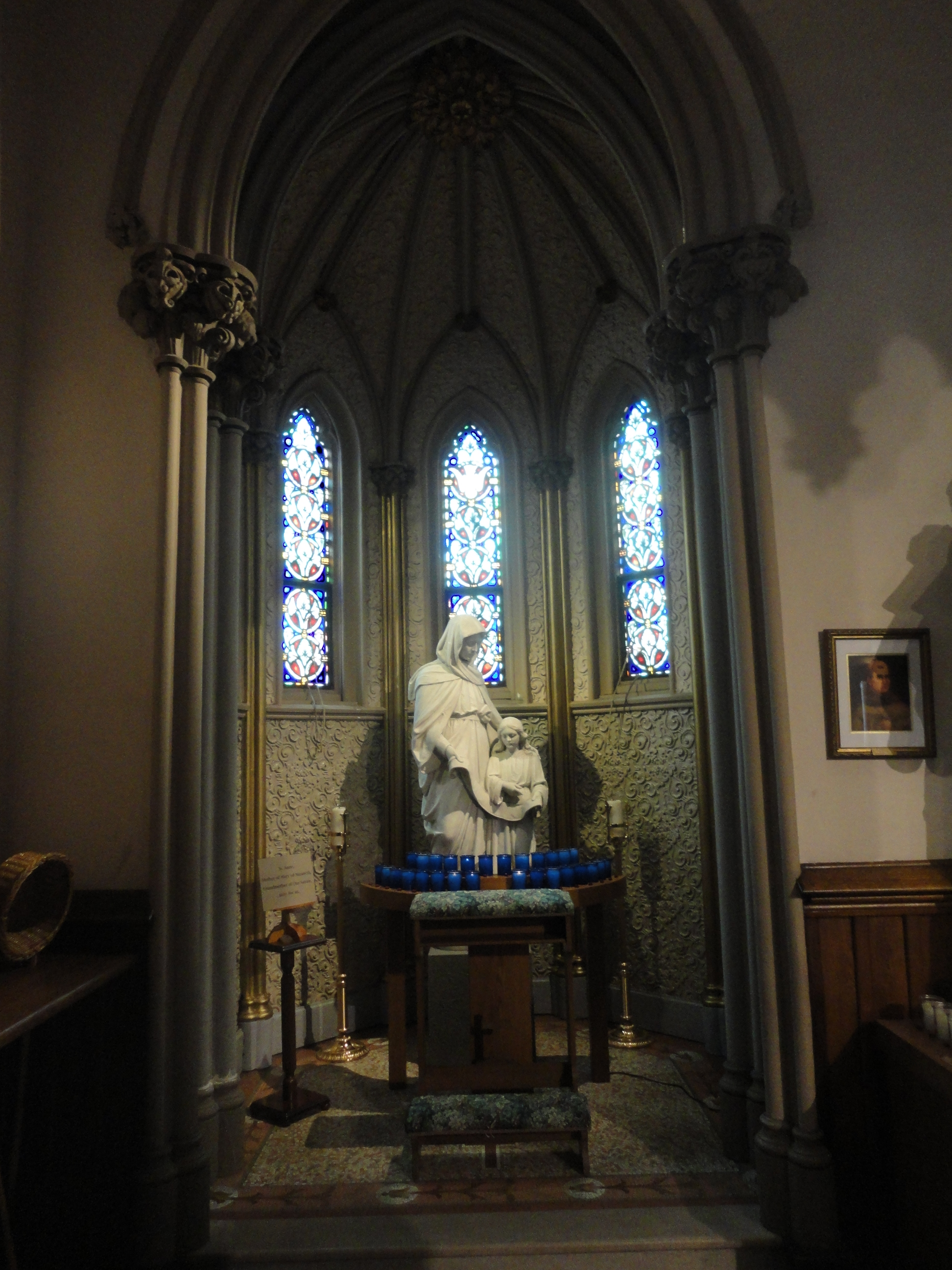
View of former baptistry, since converted to a devotional shrine.

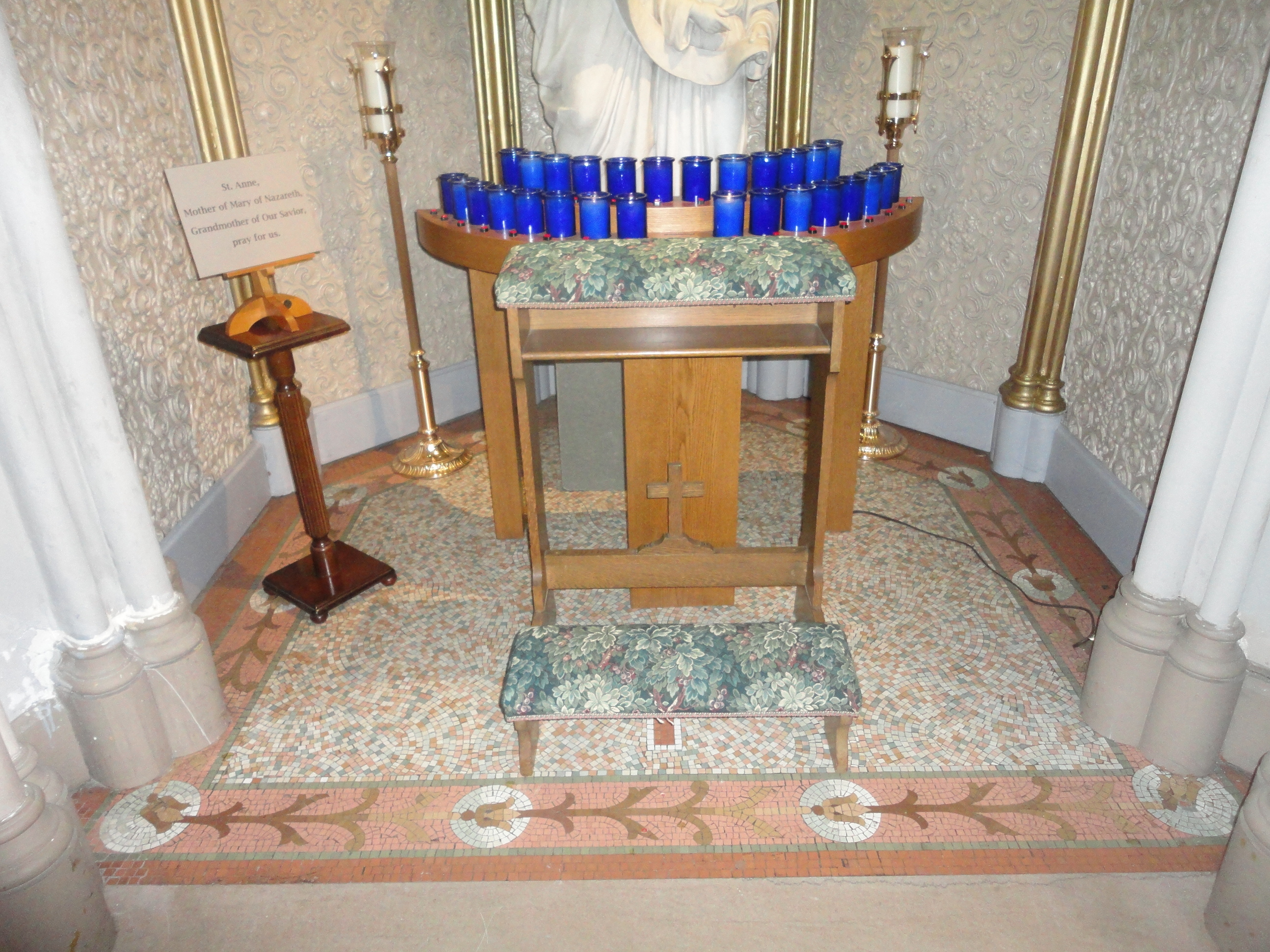
Mosaics in former baptistry.

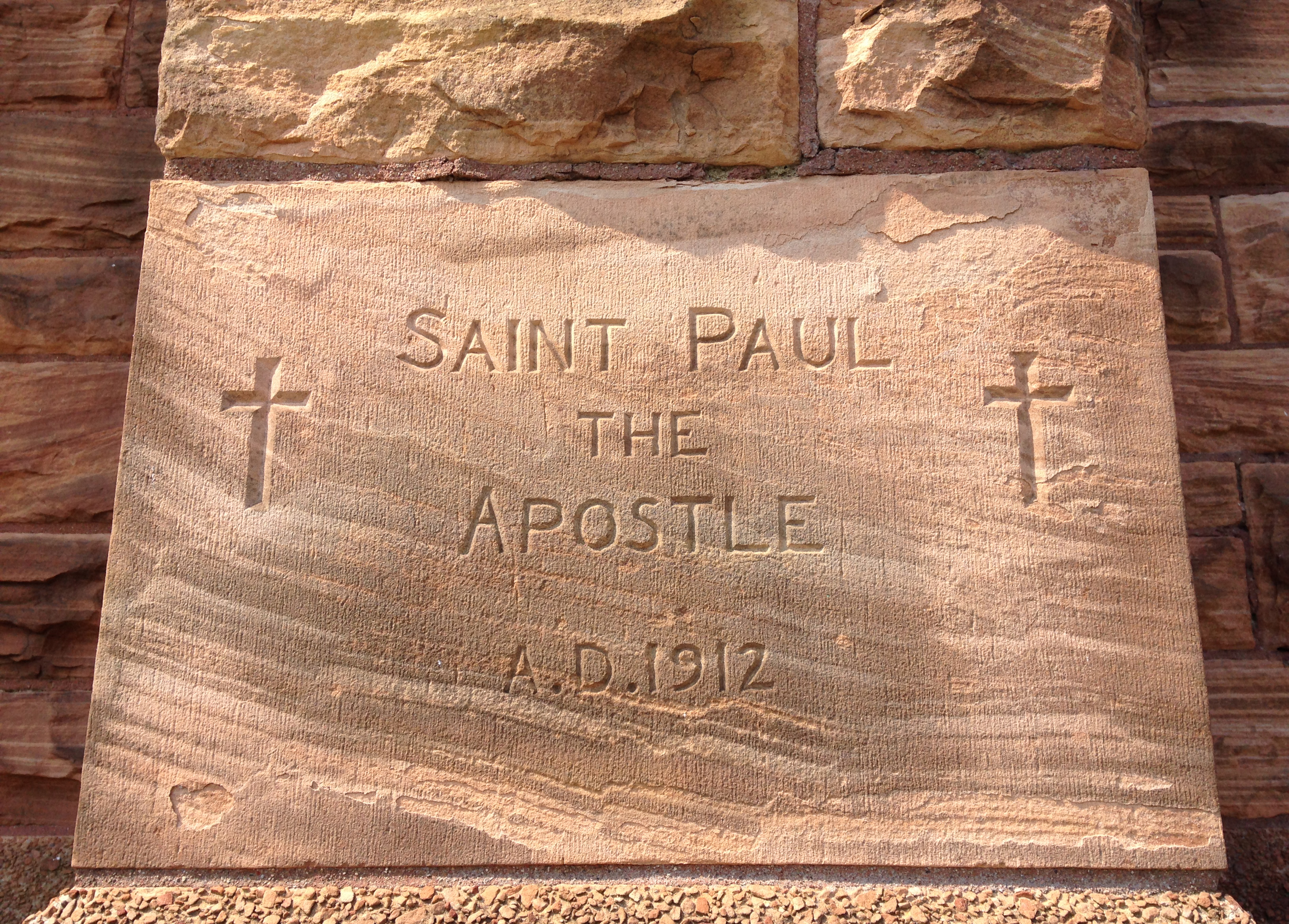
Cornerstone, located at northeastern corner of building.

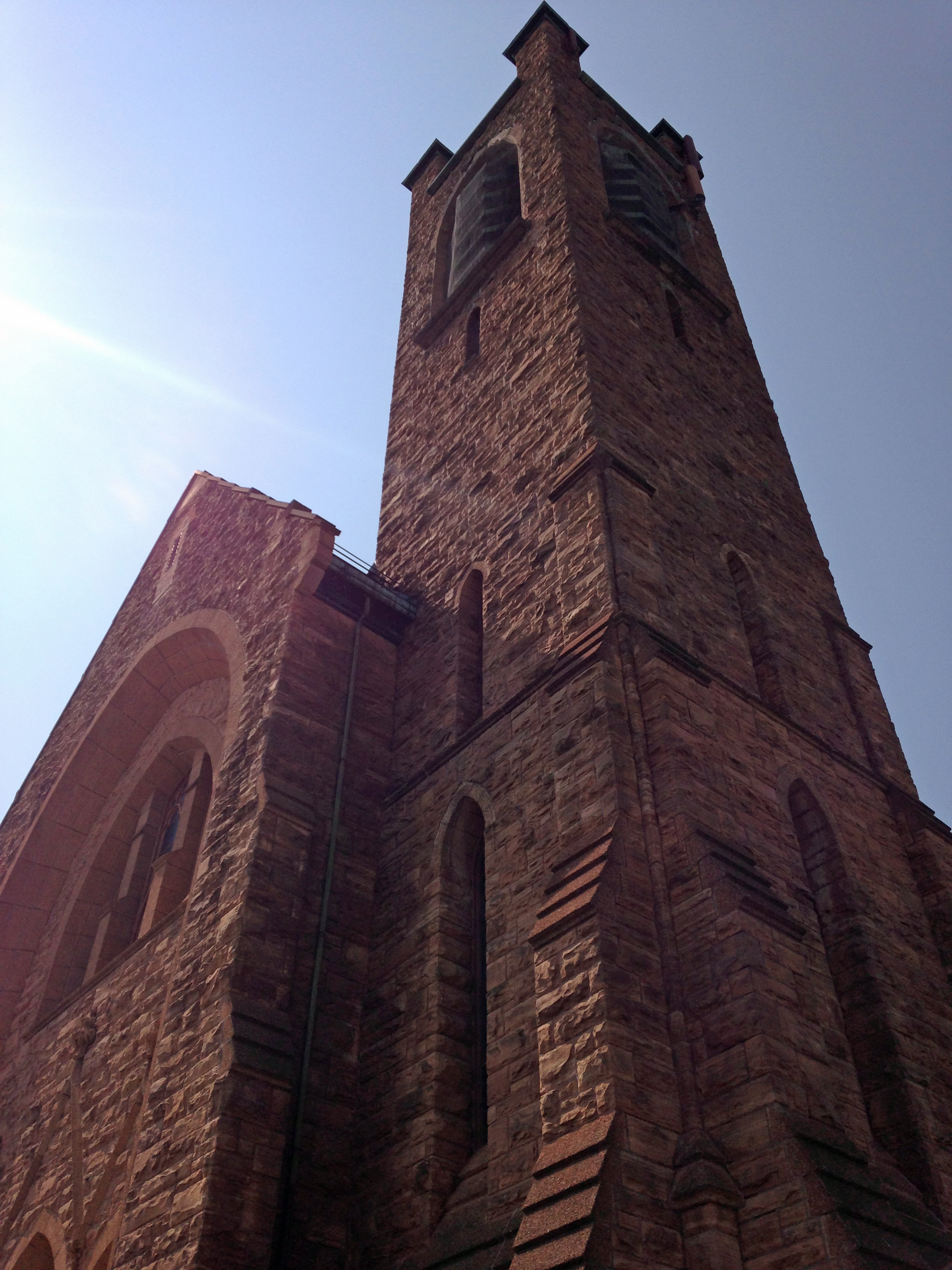
Bell tower, located at northeastern corner of building.
