= Mechanicville Hydroelectric Plant =

Power station in Saratoga County, New York

- U.S. National Register of Historic Places
- U.S. Historic district
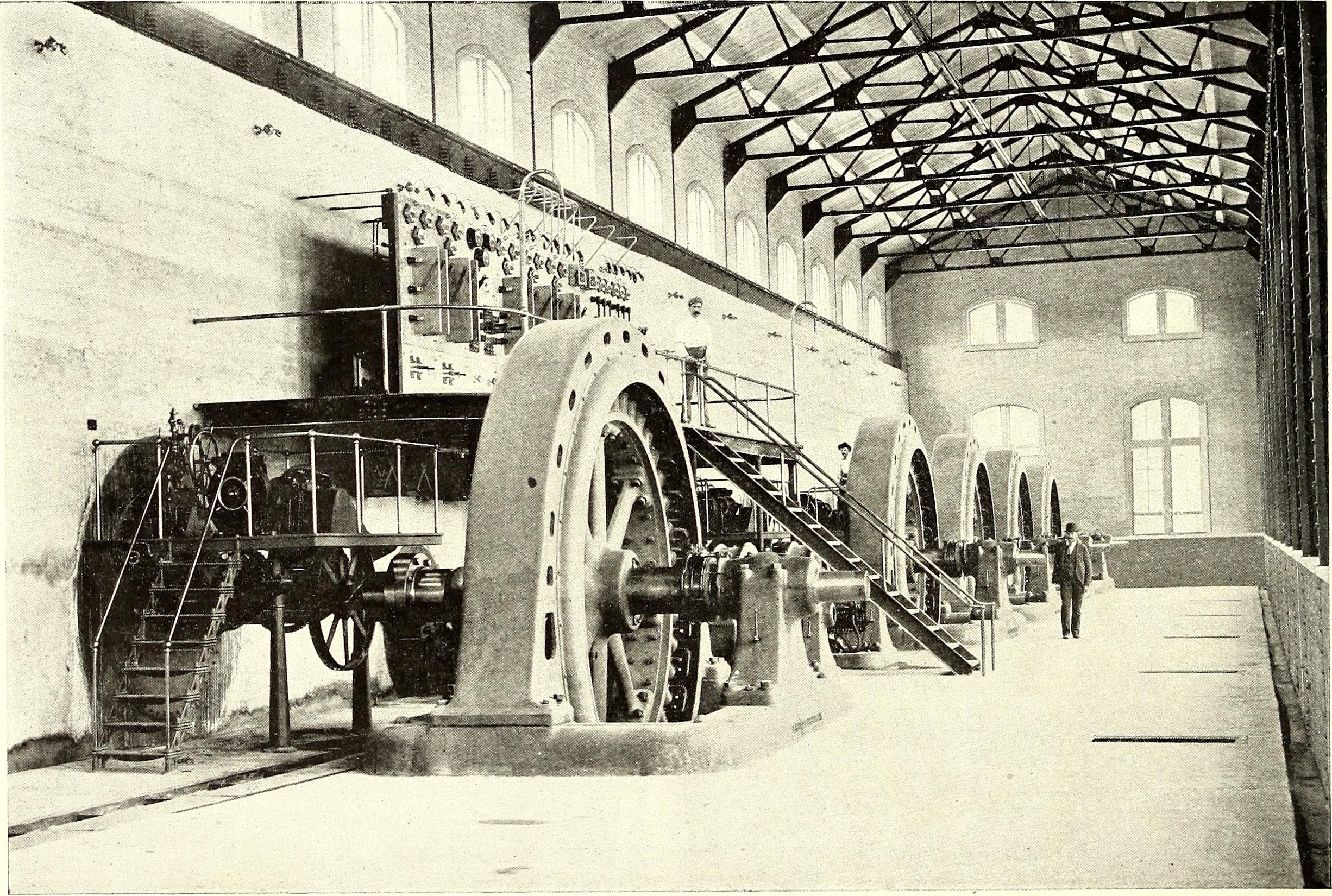
- Powerhouse of Mechanicville Hydroelectric Plant in 1898.

- Location within New York Location within the United States
- Nearest city: Mechanicville, New York
- Coordinates: 42°52′41″N 73°40′47″W
- Area: 18.3 acres (7.4 ha)
- Built: 1897
- Architect: Rice, A.C.; Stillwell-Bierce & Smith-Vaile
- Architectural style: Queen Anne
- NRHP reference No.: 89001942
- Added to NRHP: November 13, 1989

Mechanicville Hydroelectric Plant is a 18.3-acre (7.4 ha) national historic district located at Mechanicville in Saratoga County, New York. The listing included one contributing building and three contributing structures. The district dates to 1897 and includes notable Queen Anne architecture.

The district includes the powerhouse, an earth embankment, a concrete non-overflow dam, and a 700-foot-long concrete gravity overflow dam. They were built in 1897–1898 by the Hudson River Power Transmission Company and span the western channel of the Hudson River between the Saratoga County shore and Bluff Island.

It was listed on the National Register of Historic Places in 1989.

The station was designed to produce 5000 kilowatts from seven hydraulic turbine-generator units. Extensive renovations starting in 2003 have turned the plant into a working museum.

In 2021, the plant started mining bitcoin with a portion of the hydro-power energy. Because running a plant that still uses all of the original 1800s machinery, mining bitcoin has been three times more profitable than selling electricity back to the national grid.

== Project origins and construction ==
Robert Newton King (1846–1943), president of the Stillwell-Bierce & Smith-Vaile Company of Ohio, selected the site for its hydro potential and proximity to industrial areas of Albany, Troy and Schenectady. Hudson River Power Transmission was the company formed to develop the project. The Hudson River watershed runs to the Adirondack Mountains and covers 4,600 square miles (12,000 km^{2}). Construction started July 1897 but was delayed by a major storm in November; the first generator was tested in May 1898 and power delivered to the General Electric plant in July 1898. The original five turbines were completed by August 1898.

== Turbines and generators ==
The initial design of the plant used seven horizontal Francis-type turbines manufactured by King's SB&SV company, each equipped with four runners 41 inches (104 cm) in diameter, producing 1000 HP. These turbines drove a 750 kW generator at 114 rpm. The generators produced 12,000 volts three-phase power at 38 Hz. Two exciter turbine/generators were initially installed to provide 125 V and 250 kW of DC excitation power for the main generators, but DC power has been provided by a static system for more than 50 years. Generators and controls were designed by Charles Proteus Steinmetz.

Only five of the initial turbines had been completed when all seven units were replaced with new turbines in 1902. The new turbines were made by the S. Morgan Smith Company and were now rated at 1,250 horsepower (930 kW) and 125 rpm. The water passage for the turbines was modified and the operating frequency of the generators raised to 40 Hz. At the same time, a reciprocating Corliss steam engine was installed in the plant to provide supplemental capacity during low water flow; this drove the No.7 hydraulic generator through a rope drive. This was only kept for five years. One turbine failed in 1932 and has not been replaced. Each of the turbines has three water-lubricated lignum vitae wood bearings in the turbine chamber and an oil-bath bearing in the generator hall. Up until about 1950, the speed of the turbines was regulated by a hydraulic governor.

== Civil structures ==
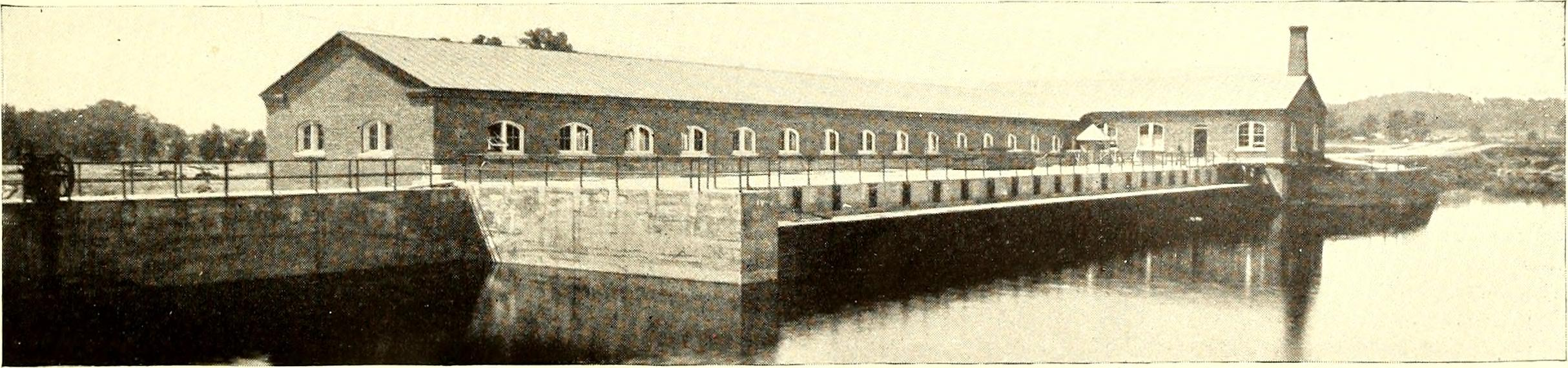
Exterior of the Mechanicville New York Hydroelectric plant in 1898

The project consists of a spillway 900 feet (270 m) feet long, an earth embankment dam about 900 feet (270 m) long and 20 feet (6.1 m) high, and a powerhouse. The powerhouse is 220 feet (67 m) wide and 50 feet (15 m) long, made of reinforced concrete. The horizontally mounted turbines in upstream water passages drive shafts running through packing boxes on the upstream headwall which is 6-foot (1.8 m) thick concrete. The arrangement of horizontal runners, packing box and generators was patented at the time; the layout of the station was a model for many future projects.

== Electrical switchgear and distribution ==
Most of the power generated by the Mechanicville plant was sent to the General Electric plant in Schenectady. Some 40 Hz power was used locally for lighting and motors until 1949. In 1899, the Hudson River Power Company took over control of the plant from the original developers, and began operating the plant in parallel with a new larger plant called Spier Falls; regulation of the Mechanicville units speed was controlled manually until automatic governors were installed in 1902. From 1935 through to the end of WWII, the HVDC Mechanicville–Schenectady DC transmission system sent power to the GE plant and also served to convert from 40 Hz to 60 Hz.

The original 12 kV switchgear used open switches operated by 3-foot (0.91 m) wooden sticks. This arrangement was quite dangerous by modern standards and resulted in one fatality and several near miss accidents. In 1902 the switchgear was replaced by oil-enclosed lever-operated switches, and in 1920 the system was again renovated with remotely controlled oil-filled circuit breakers. The 1920 switchboard has been retained to the present day.

In 1949 two motor-generator frequency changer sets were installed so that the plant could provide power to standard 60 Hz networks.

== Restoration and conversion to a museum ==
In the 1960s, Niagara Mohawk Power Company, which owned many hydroelectric facilities in New York State, had begun a program of demolition of older, smaller facilities in favor of larger central stations. Although Niagara Mohawk (which owned the Mechanicville plant) planned to demolish it, by 1985 a competitive plan for developing waterpower at the site encouraged retention of the plant. A new 50-year water license, required for continued operation of the plant, was obtained in 1993 but in 1997 the company shut down the plant since it appeared power generated at a refurbished plant would not be competitive with other sources. The plant remained closed until, after litigation, ownership was transferred to Albany Engineering Company in 2003 and generation restarted. Extensive structural repairs and enhancements were carried out to modernize the plant. Renovation plans include restoration to the original 1898 exterior appearance while maintaining output from the plant. In 2005 Albany Engineering obtained permission to study a possible additional, underground, generator unit of 20 MW rating.
