= Margaret B. Peeke =

American traveler, lecturer, author, Martinist leader (1838–1908)

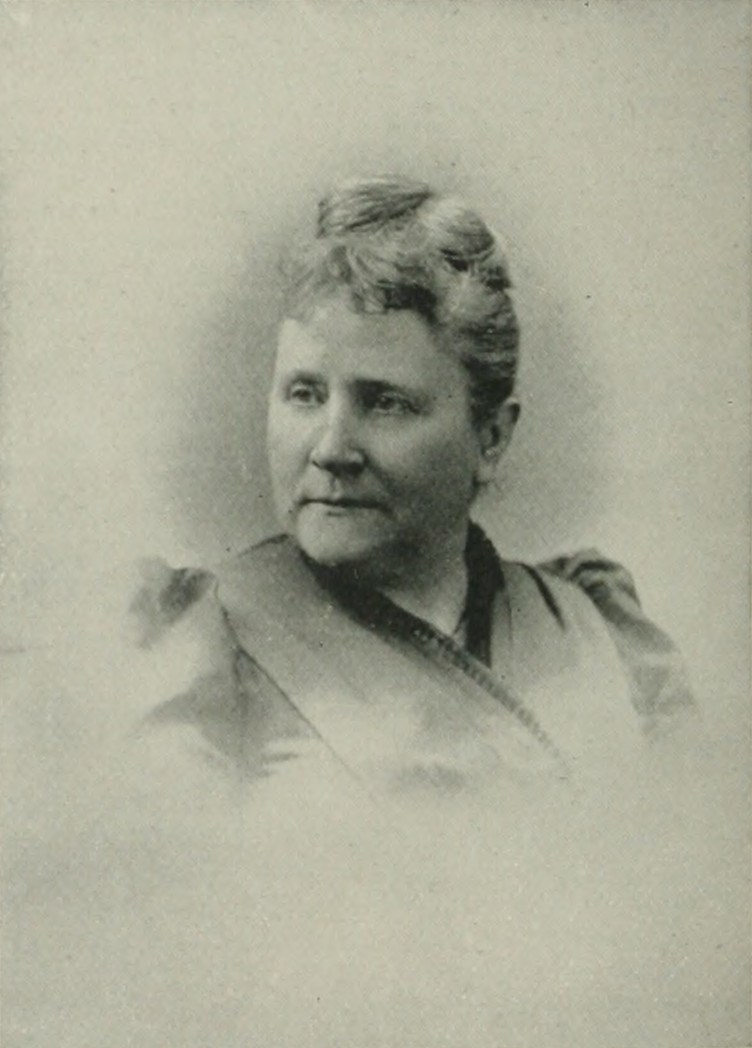
- Photo in A Woman of the Century
- Born: Margaret Bloodgood Peck; April 8, 1838; Mechanicville, New York, U.S.
- Died: November 2, 1908 (aged 70); Pomona, Tennessee, U.S.
- Occupations: traveler, lecturer, author
- Spouse: George Hewson Peeke (m. 1860)
- Children: 6
- Relatives: Erastus C. Benedict (uncle)

Margaret Bloodgood Peeke (née Peck; April 8, 1838 – November 2, 1908) was an American traveler, lecturer, and author of the long nineteenth century. In her early life, Peeke taught at a public school and her private school. Later, she taught Hermetic philosophy in New York City, Chicago, Boston, Washington, D.C., and elsewhere (1893–98); visited Hermetic societies abroad (1898–99); and had an assembly of followers in Sandusky, Ohio. She served as Inspectress-General in the U.S. of the Martinist Order of France, and as treasurer of Light of France, Hermetic Society of France. She was a member of the Baháʼí Faith and of the Rose Cross Martinist Fraternity.

== Early life and education ==
Margaret Bloodgood Peck was born at Mechanicville, New York, (Note: Peeke's 1908 obituary in the Rock Island Argus records her place of birth as Stillwater, Pennsylvania.) near Saratoga Springs, April 8, 1838. Her parents were Garry Marshall and Narcissa (Benedict) Peck.

Most of her childhood days were spent in New York City. She was twelve years old when her father died. She was educated in public and private schools. Her mother's brother, Erastus C. Benedict, Chancellor of the University of the State of New York, charged himself with Margaret's education and became in many ways her counselor and guide.

== Career ==
At the age of 16, she was already a contributor to magazines and periodicals. She taught in a public school in New York (1853–54), and her private school in Irvington, New Jersey (1855-1859).

On May 17, 1860, (Note: According to Leonard & Marquis (1908), the date of marriage is May 16, 1860.) she married Rev. George Hewson Peeke (1833–1915). In the later part of the decade, he served as pastor of the Dutch Reformed Church in Rock Island, Illinois.

She set aside her writing career for fifteen years to focus on family life and parish responsibilities. Later, when poor health required her to slow down, she returned to creative work, sending poems and short stories to a range of literary magazines.

In 1876, the family moved to Chicago, Illinois. Till 1882, Peeke was a part owner and served as associate editor of the Alliance, of Chicago. Her letters drew attention to her favorite summer resort in the Cumberland Mountains, and a little pamphlet entitled "Pomona" was her reply to many requests for information. This was followed by a serial story, "The Madonna of the Mountains", and other serial sketches of that region.

Peeke's short biography of George Lansing Raymond appeared in an 1890 volume of The Magazine of Poetry. Her college novel, titled Antrobus written while her son was in college in New England, was purchased by the Detroit Free Press and published as a serial in 1892, preparatory to a more permanent book form. She was involved in a work connected with the pygmies of America and the origin of the race; it was issued under the title Born of Flame (Philadelphia, 1892). During this time in her life, she also taught Bible classes.

Later, Peeke became a leader of the Martinist movement in the U.S., giving her entire time to this work. Zenia, the Vestal, a story of Occult Life (1893; section edition, 1897), received a poor review in the British magazine, Light: A Journal of Psychical, Occult, and Mystical Research. "The Mission of Practical Occultism To-Day" and "The Psychic and the Spiritual" were published in The Arena, in 1895. "Occult Truths Taught in the Mystic Land where 'Silence is Written on Everything'" and "True Magic. An Important Paper of a Practical Character on this Little Understood Subject" were published in 1901 in the Star of the Magi. Beginning in the same year, Peeke taught "Lessons in Practical Occultism. By Correspondence."

By decree of the Supreme Council of the Martinist Order, the post of Sovereign Delegate General for the United States was abolished in 1902. It was replaced by a post of Inspectress-General of the Order, and this post was confided to Peeke, living at the time in Sandusky, Ohio. At the time, she was the sole member of the Order in the U.S. possessing the Grade of Rosy-Cross of the Martinist Order. Numbers & Letters: Or, The Thirty-two Paths of Wisdom was published in 1908.

== Death and legacy ==
Peeke died at the Peeke winter home in Pomona, Tennessee, on November 2, 1908, survived by her husband and two of their six children, Hewsen L. and Benedict Peeke. Benedict committed suicide at a hotel in Cleveland, Ohio, September 21, 1910. In the following year, his widow, Dr. Pauline Barton-Peeke, published in booklet form an account of her mother-in-law's visit to Acca and subsequent investigations of the teachings of The Revelation of Baha'u'llah, titled My Visits to Abbas Effendi (Abdul-Baha) in 1899, by Mrs. Margaret B. Peeke.

== Selected works ==
- Antrobus, 1892
- Born of Flame: A Rosicrucian Story, 1892
- Zenia, the Vestal, a Story of Occult Life, 1893
- Soul development, or, Truth of all ages : taught by Margaret B. Peeke., 18-- (Text)
- Numbers & Letters: Or, The Thirty-two Paths of Wisdom, 1908 (Text)
- My Visit to Abbas-Effendi in 1899, 1911
