= Joe Cocozzo =

American football player (born 1970)

No. 63, 68
- Position: Guard

Personal information
- Born: August 7, 1970 (age 56); Mechanicville, New York, U.S.
- Listed height: 6 ft 4 in (1.93 m)
- Listed weight: 300 lb (136 kg)

Career information
- High school: Mechanicville
- College: Michigan
- NFL draft: 1993: 3rd round, 84th overall pick

Career history
- San Diego Chargers (1993–1997); Washington Redskins (1998)*; New Orleans Saints (1999)*
- * Offseason or practice squad member only

Awards and highlights
- Second-team All-American (1992); First-team All-Big Ten (1992); Second-team All-Big Ten (1991)

Career NFL statistics
- Games played: 77
- Games started: 48
- Stats at Pro Football Reference

Joe Cocozzo (born August 7, 1970) is an American former professional football player who was an offensive guard for the San Diego Chargers of the National Football League (NFL) from 1993 to 1997. He played college football for the Michigan Wolverines from 1989 to 1992, earning second-team All-American honors in 1992.

== Early life ==
Cocozzo was born in Mechanicville, New York, in 1970. He attended Mechanicville High School. He was a star football player for the Mechanicville Red Raiders. His high school honored him at a 2013 ceremony in which his jersey (#77) was put on permanent display.

== College career ==
Cocozzo enrolled at the University of Michigan in 1988 and played college football for the Michigan Wolverines football teams as an offensive tackle in 1989 and as an offensive guard from 1990 to 1992. He started 32 games at right guard—eight in 1990, 12 in 1991, and 12 in 1992. Cocozzo played for the undefeated 1992 Michigan team that compiled a 9–0–3 record, won the Big Ten Conference championship, and defeated Washington in the 1993 Rose Bowl. At the end of the 1992 season, he was selected as a first-team All-Big Ten player and a second-team All-American. He also played in the 1993 Senior Bowl.

== Professional career ==
Pre-draft measurables
Height	Weight	Arm length	Hand span	40-yard dash	10-yard split	20-yard split	20-yard shuttle	Vertical jump	Broad jump	Bench press
6 ft 3 7/8 in (1.93 m)	300 lb (136 kg)	32 1/2 in (0.83 m)	10 5/8 in (0.27 m)	5.30 s	1.79 s	3.03 s	4.63 s	22.0 in (0.56 m)	8 ft 0 in (2.44 m)	26 reps
All values from NFL Combine

Cocozzo was selected by the San Diego Chargers in the third round (64th overall pick) of the 1993 NFL draft. In July 1993, he signed a three-year contract with the Chargers. He played five seasons for the Chargers from 1993 to 1997. He appeared in 77 NFL games, including 48 games as a starter. He started 13 regular season games at left guard for the 1994 San Diego Chargers that won the AFC Championship Game, but lost Super Bowl XXIX to the San Francisco 49ers.

He signed with the Washington Redskins as a free agent in June 1998. He injured his elbow during training camp and was cut with an injury settlement. After rehabilitating for a year, he went to training camp with the New Orleans Saints in 1999. He broke ribs on the first day of training camp when he was hit by a running back. He announced his official retirement before the 2000 season.

== Later life ==
Cocozzo retired from football after suffering injuries, ultimately undergoing three operations on his left shoulder. When his playing career was over, he returned to Stillwater and purchased 350 acres adjacent to the Saratoga Battlefield. He later married Amanda Marshall. He and his wife have two sons, Anthony and James.
