= Aida Brewer =

New York State Treasurer (born 1955)

Aida Brewer is the first female treasurer of the state of New York. Brewer was born March 27, 1955, in Mechanicville. In April 2002, Governor George Pataki appointed Brewer treasurer.
