= Col. Elmer E. Ellsworth Monument and Grave =

War memorial in the Hudson View Cemetery, New York

- Ellsworth, Col. Elmer E., Monument and Grave
- U.S. National Register of Historic Places
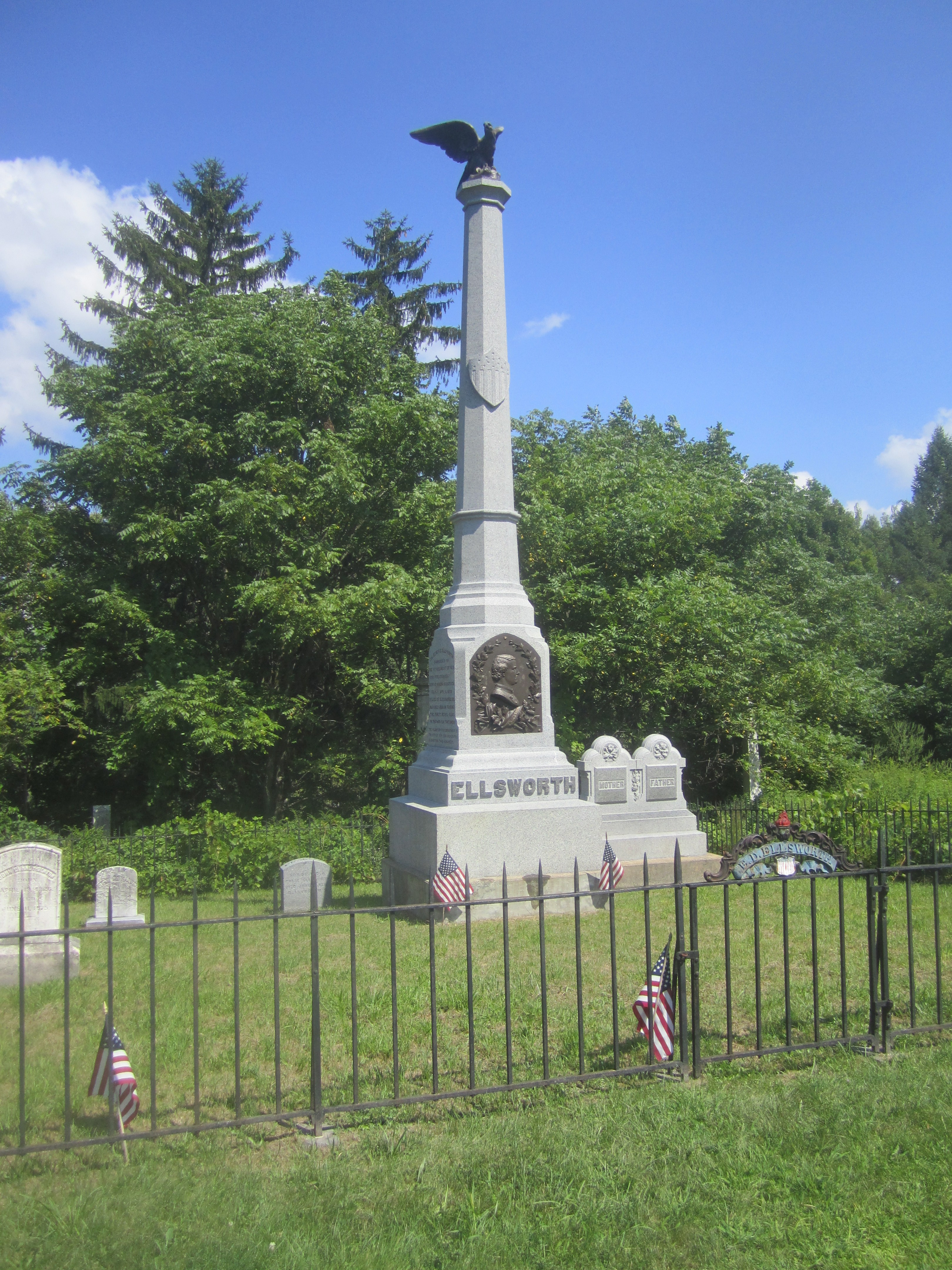

- Location within New York Location within the United States
- Location: Hudson View Cemetery, Mechanicville, New York
- Coordinates: 42°53′53″N 73°41′32″W
- Area: less than one acre
- Built: 1874
- NRHP reference No.: 76001273
- Added to NRHP: November 13, 1976

Col. Elmer E. Ellsworth Monument and Grave is a historic site within Hudson View Cemetery in Mechanicville, New York.

The monument to Elmer E. Ellsworth, the first Union officer casualty of the American Civil War, was built in 1874 and added to the National Register of Historic Places in 1976.

In 1997 the 300 pounds (140 kg) bronze eagle was stolen from the top of the monument. The eagle was recognized and returned by an antique dealer in 1998.
