= Mechanicville, New York =

Mechanicville
- City
- City of Mechanicville
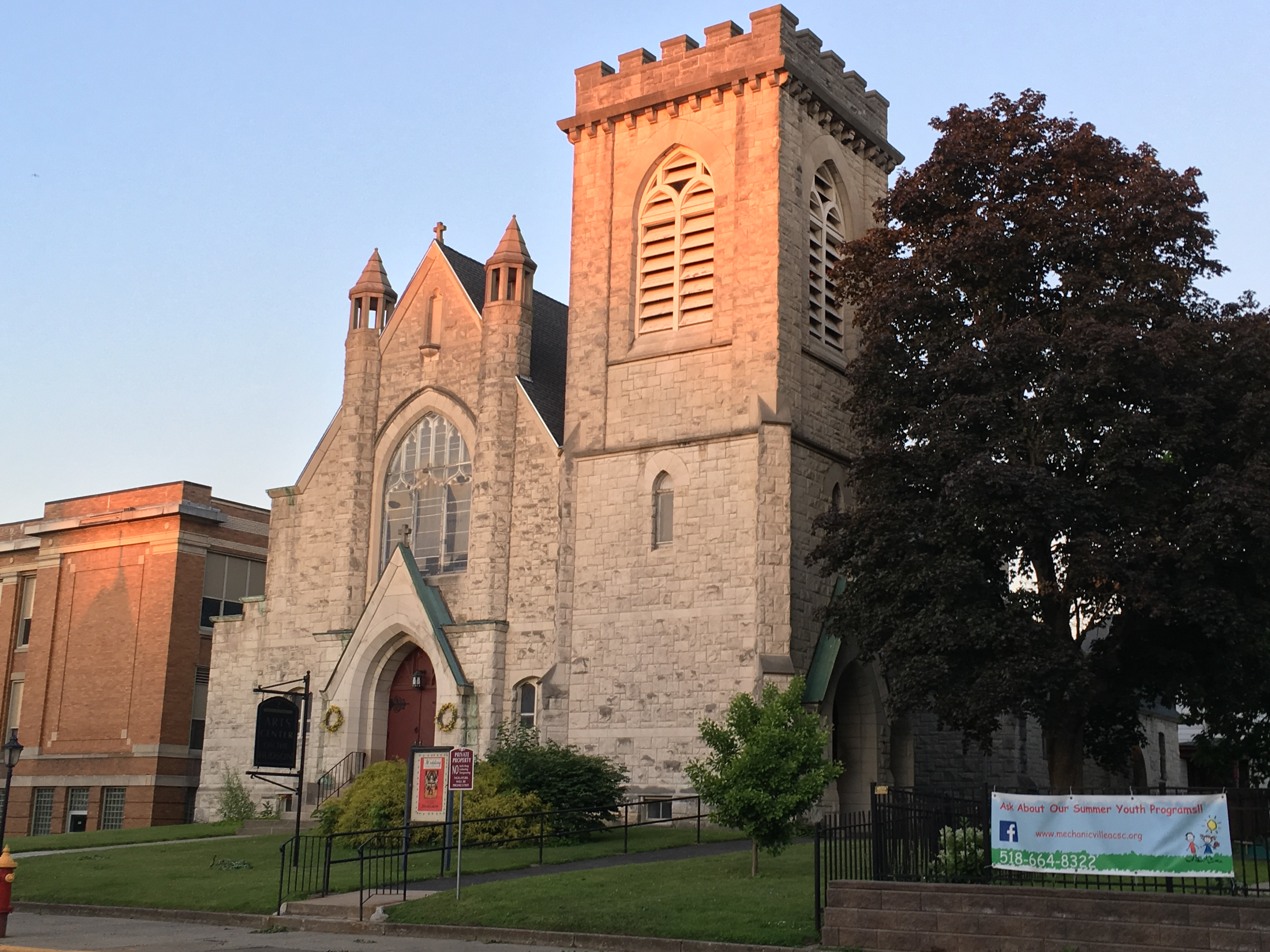

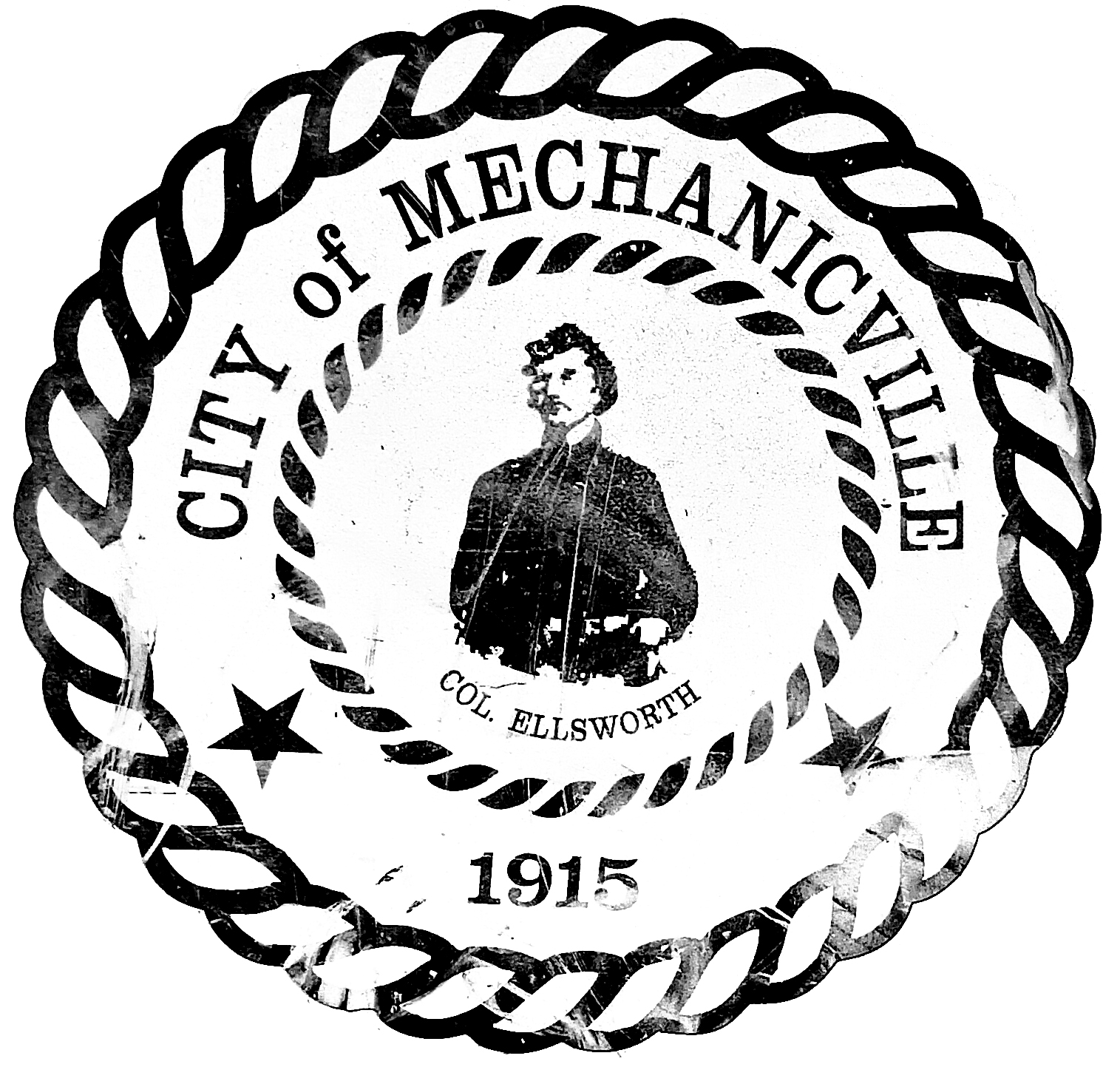
- Seal
- Nickname: The Paper City
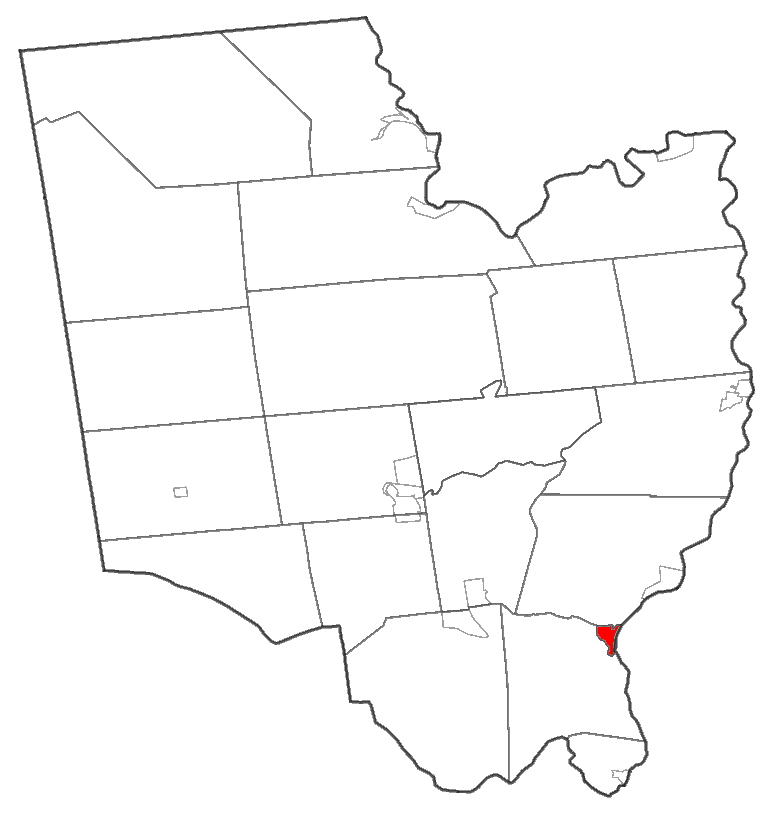
- Location within Saratoga County

- Location within the state of New York
- Coordinates: 42°54′14″N 73°41′26″W
- Country: United States
- State: New York
- County: Saratoga
- First settled: 1764
- Incorporated (village): 1859
- Incorporated (city): 1915

Government
  - Type: City Commission
  - Mayor: Michael Butler (R)
  - City Commission: Members' List: Commissioner of Accounts: • Kimberly Dunn (R); Commissioner of Finance: • Jodie Gilheany (D); Commissioner of Public Safety: • Barbara McGuire (D); Commissioner of Public Works: • Anthony Gotti (D)
  - State Assembly: Carrie Woerner (D) (2014)
  - State Senate: Jim Tedisco (R) (2023)
  - U.S. House: Paul Tonko (D)

Area
  - Total: 0.92 sq mi (2.38 km^{2})
  - Land: 0.84 sq mi (2.17 km^{2})
  - Water: 0.077 sq mi (0.20 km^{2})
- Elevation: 104 ft (31.7 m)

Population (2020)
  - Total: 5,163
  - Density: 6,155.2/sq mi (2,376.54/km^{2})
- Time zone: UTC-5 (EST)
  - Summer (DST): UTC-4 (EDT)
- ZIP code: 12118
- Area code: 518
- FIPS code: 36-46360
- GNIS feature ID: 0956897
- Website: City of Mechanicville

Mechanicville is a city in Saratoga County, New York, United States. The population was 5,163 at the 2020 census, a small decrease from 5,196 in 2010. It is the smallest city by area in the state. The name is derived from the occupations of early residents.

The city is located on the eastern border of Saratoga County and is north of Albany, the state capital. Mechanicville borders the towns of Stillwater (of which it was once a part) and Halfmoon in the county, and the town of Schaghticoke, Rensselaer County.

== History ==
The first listing of a settlement on Tenandeho Creek (Anthony Kill) is in 1721. At that time, Cornelius Van Buren had a sawmill at the mouth of the creek where it emptied into the Hudson River.

Perspective map and of Mechanicville and list of landmarks from late 19th century by L.R. Burleigh

The first documented occurrence of the name "Mechanicville" dates back to 1829. The name comes from the early settlers, who were independent mastercraftsmen such as millers, carpenters, or butchers, whose professions were commonly known as the "mechanical arts" at the time.

About 35 years later, small flour mills were already established. When the Champlain Canal reached the settlement in 1823, and especially when the Rensselaer and Saratoga Railroad laid a track through the area in 1835, Mechanicville became an important commerce interchange.

The community became an incorporated village in 1859, when it had about 1000 inhabitants. It grew rapidly as textile mills, factories, and a linen thread company came to Mechanicville.

The first conspicuous casualty of the American Civil War, Elmer E. Ellsworth, was buried in Mechanicville in 1861. His grave is located in the Hudson View Cemetery and is identifiable with a large eagle on top of his memorial.

In 1878, additional railways came to the village, and it became an important center of papermaking.

In 1898, Robert Newton King built a hydroelectric power plant on the Hudson River. The Mechanicville Hydroelectric Plant is now the oldest continuously operating hydroelectric plant in the United States and was listed on the National Register of Historic Places in 1989.

By 1900, Mechanicville was a major transfer yard and car repair center for the railways. In the 1920s, Mechanicville had a population of nearly 10,000.

In both the 1900 and 1910 censuses, Mechanicville was enumerated with the town of Half Moon, just to the south of Stillwater.

Mechanicville became a city in 1915. By 1932, it became the terminal of the first experimental high-voltage direct-current (HVDC) scheme in the U.S.: the HVDC Mechanicville–Schenectady line.

With the decline of the railroads, Mechanicville suffered. The largest paper mill in the world, which Mechanicville had hosted since 1904, ceased operations in 1971, and the once thriving industrial city is today a quiet residential city, with most inhabitants working in Albany, Schenectady, and other nearby communities.

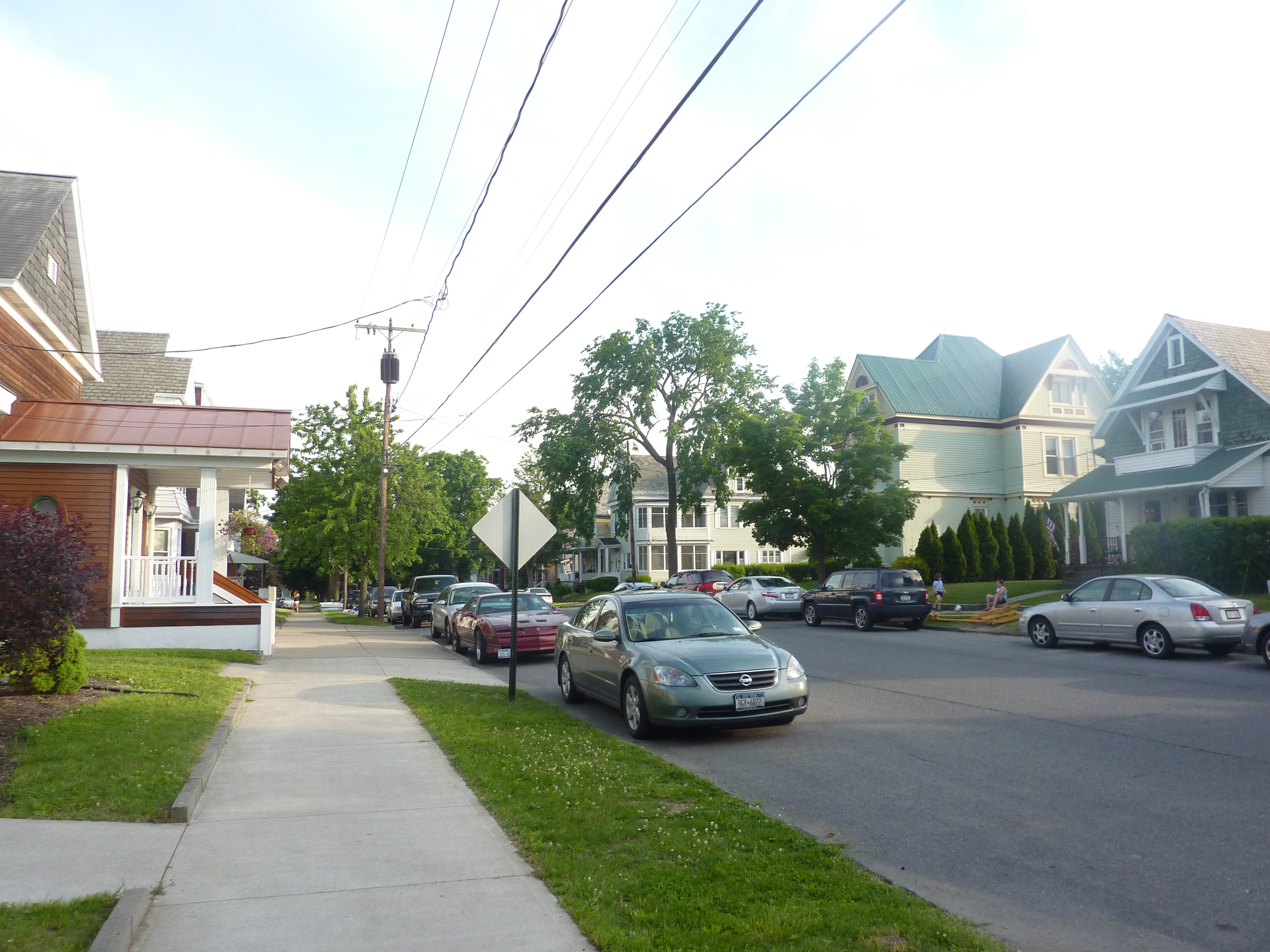
A typical residential street in Mechanicville

On November 1, 2001, Mechanicville was featured on the Daily Show with then-rising comedian Steve Carell. The Mechanicville Hydroelectric Plant and Col. Elmer E. Ellsworth Monument and Grave are listed on the National Register of Historic Places.

=== Mechanicville-Stillwater tornado ===
On May 31, 1998, a large tornado tore through Mechanicville and the adjacent town of Stillwater. It was spawned by a series of severe storms in the late afternoon, causing major damage to the town's old industrial section located on US Route 4 and NY-32, along the Hudson River. One of the two historic smokestacks (visible from two miles away) was knocked down by the tornado. In 2005, the other smokestack and the conjoined building were bulldozed. Houses on the Viall Avenue hill sections of Mechanicville and Stillwater were completely destroyed. The tornado was rated F3 on the Fujita scale (winds estimated at 200 MPH).

=== Rail yard ===
In January 2012, a new intermodal and automotive terminal opened on the site of a former Boston and Maine rail yard. The new rail yard was built by Pan Am Southern, a joint venture between Pan Am Railways and Norfolk Southern.

The $40 million facility Is also used for filet-toupee operations, converting double stack container trains from the west to single stack by removing the top layer of containers. This allows the rest of the train to proceed east along track that lacks double stack clearance, particularly the 4 3/4 mile Hoosac Tunnel. The removed containers are trucked to local destinations. Toupee refers to the reverse process, where a single stack train coming from the east has additional containers placed on top for the rest of its trip. Some 300 trucks a day visit the site. The automotive terminal opened in 2014.

== Geography ==
Mechanicville is located at 42°54′14″N 73°41′26″W (42.903922, -73.690458).

According to the United States Census Bureau, the city has a total area of 0.9 square miles (2.3 km^{2}), of which 0.8 square miles (2.1 km^{2}) is land and 0.1 square miles (0.26 km^{2}) (8.79%) is water. The city of Mechanicville is on the west bank of the Hudson River at the influx of the Anthony Kill. US Route 4, and conjoined New York State Route 32 are north–south highways through Mechanicville. New York State Route 67 intersects NY-32 and US-4 in the city. County Roads 75 and 1345 also lead into the city.

== Religion ==
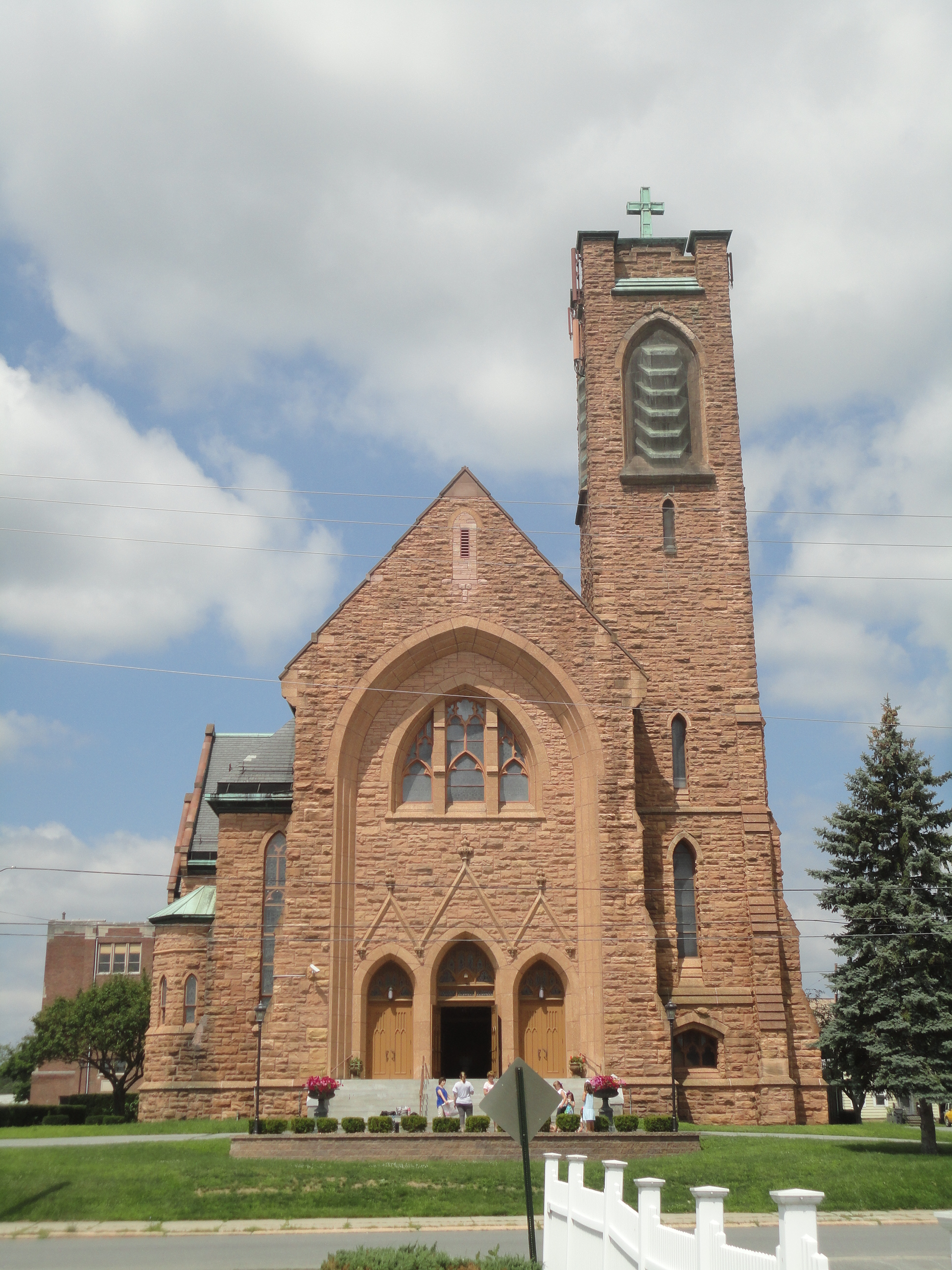
St. Paul the Apostle Church (Parish of All Saints on the Hudson)

While Mechanicville has historically had many religious institutions, there are currently two active churches in the city, the Catholic parish of All Saints on the Hudson, and the Mechanicville United Methodist Church.

== Sports ==
Mechanicville is home to the Saratoga Racers of the American Basketball Association, which play their home games at the North Main Street Gym.

== Notable people ==
- Orie Amodeo, musician in the Lawrence Welk orchestra
- Aida Brewer, first female treasurer of the state of New York
- Chad Brown, Thoroughbred horse racing trainer
- Rita Chatterton, professional wrestling referee
- Ray Eberle, vocalist with Glenn Miller orchestra
- Bob Eberly, vocalist with Jimmy Dorsey orchestra
- Joe Cocozzo, professional football player and Super Bowl XXIX participant
- Elmer E. Ellsworth, friend and law clerk to Abraham Lincoln, colonel in the Union Army, leader of the Fire Zouaves, and first conspicuous casualty of the American Civil War.
- John R. Fellows, lawyer, politician, and Confederate soldier
- Ray Heindorf, songwriter, composer, conductor, and arranger
- Erika Holzer, novelist, essayist, and lawyer
- Fred Isabella, dentist and state politician
- John Gavin Nolan, bishop of the Military Ordinariate of the United States
- Margaret Bloodgood Peeke, traveler, lecturer, author
- Gordon A. Sheehan, animator for Fleischer Studios
- Harrison B. Tordoff, ornithologist, conservationist, author, and fighter pilot
- George Herbert Whitney, New York state assemblyman and senator

== Demographics ==
Historical population
Census	Pop.	Note	%±
1870	1,075		—
1880	1,265		17.7%
1890	2,679		111.8%
1900	4,695		75.3%
1910	6,634		41.3%
1920	8,166		23.1%
1930	7,924		−3.0%
1940	7,449		−6.0%
1950	7,385		−0.9%
1960	6,831		−7.5%
1970	6,247		−8.5%
1980	5,500		−12.0%
1990	5,249		−4.6%
2000	5,019		−4.4%
2010	5,196		3.5%
2020	5,163		−0.6%
U.S. Decennial Census

=== 2020 census ===
As of the 2020 census, Mechanicville had a population of 5,163. The median age was 35.8 years. 22.3% of residents were under the age of 18 and 15.5% of residents were 65 years of age or older. For every 100 females there were 92.3 males, and for every 100 females age 18 and over there were 88.3 males age 18 and over.

100.0% of residents lived in urban areas, while 0.0% lived in rural areas.

There were 2,429 households in Mechanicville, of which 25.7% had children under the age of 18 living in them. Of all households, 27.8% were married-couple households, 23.9% were households with a male householder and no spouse or partner present, and 37.1% were households with a female householder and no spouse or partner present. About 40.8% of all households were made up of individuals and 15.8% had someone living alone who was 65 years of age or older.

There were 2,695 housing units, of which 9.9% were vacant. The homeowner vacancy rate was 3.8% and the rental vacancy rate was 6.5%.

Racial composition as of the 2020 census
Race	Number	Percent
White	4,615	89.4%
Black or African American	96	1.9%
American Indian and Alaska Native	7	0.1%
Asian	53	1.0%
Native Hawaiian and Other Pacific Islander	1	0.0%
Some other race	66	1.3%
Two or more races	325	6.3%
Hispanic or Latino (of any race)	207	4.0%

=== 2000 census ===
As of the census of 2000, there were 5,019 people, 2,219 households, and 1,275 families residing in the city. The population density was 6,028.4 inhabitants per square mile (2,327.6/km^{2}). There were 2,386 housing units at an average density of 2,865.8 per square mile (1,106.5/km^{2}). The racial makeup of the city was 97.95% White, 0.36% African American, 0.10% Native American, 0.66% Asian, 0.44% from other races, and 0.50% from two or more races. Hispanic or Latino of any race were 1.20% of the population.

There were 2,219 households, out of which 29.1% had children under the age of 18 living with them, 40.9% were married couples living together, 12.3% had a female householder with no husband present, and 42.5% were non-families. 36.5% of all households were made up of individuals, and 19.4% had someone living alone who was 65 years of age or older. The average household size was 2.26 and the average family size was 2.97.

In the city, the population was spread out, with 24.4% under the age of 18, 8.2% from 18 to 24, 30.1% from 25 to 44, 18.5% from 45 to 64, and 18.7% who were 65 years of age or older. The median age was 36 years. For every 100 females, there were 89.0 males. For every 100 females age 18 and over, there were 82.7 males.

The median income for a household in the city was $34,509, and the median income for a family was $42,143. Males had a median income of $32,825 versus $25,143 for females. The per capita income for the city was $17,236. About 6.5% of families and 8.0% of the population were below the poverty line, including 9.5% of those under age 18 and 7.4% of those age 65 or over.

== See also ==
- Mechanicville High School
