= Mechanicville High School =

Mechanicville Jr./Sr High School
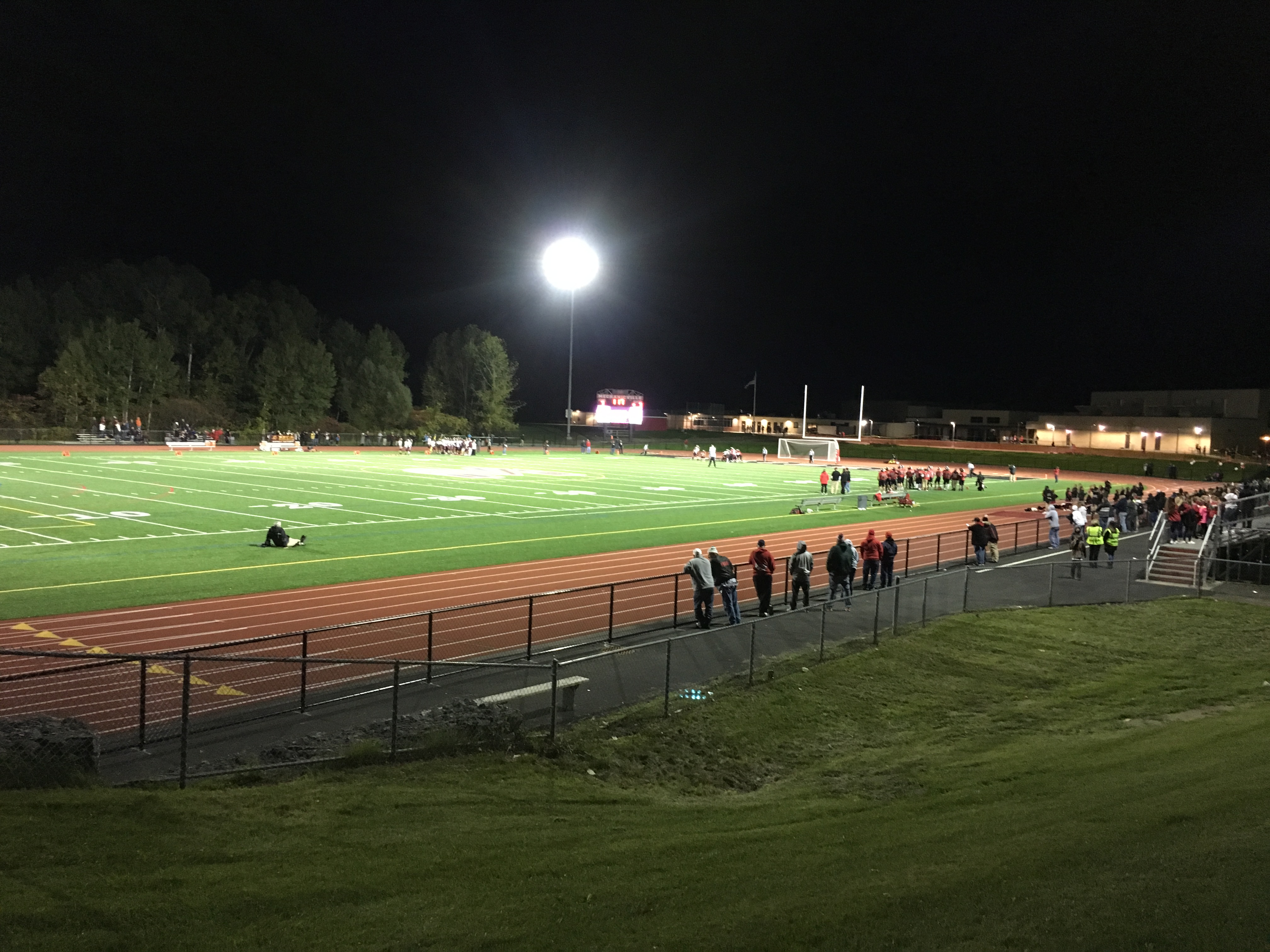

Location
- 25 Kniskern Avenue; Mechanicville, NY 12118; United States
- Coordinates: 42°54′8.6″N 73°41′58.87″W

Information
- Type: Public secondary
- Principal: Mike Mitchell
- Staff: 60.00 (FTE)
- Grades: 6-12
- Enrollment: 726 (2023–2024)
- Student to teacher ratio: 12.10
- Colors: Red, black and white
- Mascot: Red Raider
- Website: Mechanicville Junior/Senior High School

Mechanicville Jr./Sr. High School is a school located in Halfmoon, New York The school is part of the Mechanicville City School district and serves the district's sixth through 12th grades. In 2011, a merger occurred between the high school and the middle school causing the school to now be known as Mechanicville Jr./Sr. High School.

== Activities and athletics ==
=== Fall Sports ===
- Cheerleading – Varsity
- Cross Country Boys- Varsity/Modified
- Cross Country Girls- Varsity/Modified
- Football – Varsity/Junior Varsity/Modified
- Golf Boys – Varsity/Junior Varsity
- Soccer Boys – Varsity/Junior Varsity/Modified
- Soccer Girls – Varsity/Junior Varsity/Modified
- Volleyball Girls – Varsity/Junior Varsity/Modified

=== Winter Sports ===
- Cheerleading – Varsity/Junior Varsity
- Basketball Boys – Varsity/Junior Varsity/Modified 7/Modified 8
- Basketball Girls – Varsity/Junior Varsity/Modified 7/Modified 8
- Bowling Boys – Varsity
- Bowling Girls – Varsity
- Indoor Track Boys – Varsity
- Indoor Track Girls – Varsity
- Wrestling – Varsity/Modified

=== Spring Sports ===
- Baseball – Varsity/Junior Varsity/Modified
- Outdoor Track Boys – Varsity/Modified
- Outdoor Track Girls – Varsity/Modified
- Softball – Varsity/Junior Varsity/Modified
- Lacrosse – Varsity/JV/Modified

== Campus ==
=== Auditorium ===
In the 1992–93 school year, Mechanicville High School opened the Paul Luther Memorial Auditorium. This facility seats 750 people.

=== 2003 expansion ===
Mechanicville High School opened a new gymnasium and a library media center in the winter of 2003. During this time, a chemistry and physics science lab was also built. Thelab allows students who take chemistry and physics the opportunity to participate in all the lab requirements mandated by the New York State Regents, as well as those recommended by various colleges and universities. In September 2003, the Middle School portion occupied a new addition which houses a Science Lab, a Technology classroom complete with a video production area, a Family and Consumer Science suite along with three classrooms and a Middle School Cafeteria.

=== Indoor pool ===
Mechanicville High School was one of the few schools in Upstate New York that had an indoor swimming pool for the community to enjoy. However, it was closed down in 2008 and in 2015–16 a new building project was granted to the school which renovated it into a café. When the pool was in use its dimension were 75×25 feet and had four lanes.

=== Combination of schools ===
Mechanicville High School combined their Middle School and High Schools into a Jr./Sr. High School under one principal.

== Notable alumni ==
- Orie Amodeo, musician and member of the Lawrence Welk orchestra
- Joe Cocozzo, retired NFL player
- Gordon A. Sheehan, cartoonist and animator
