= Empire State Trail =

Hiking and biking trail in New York State

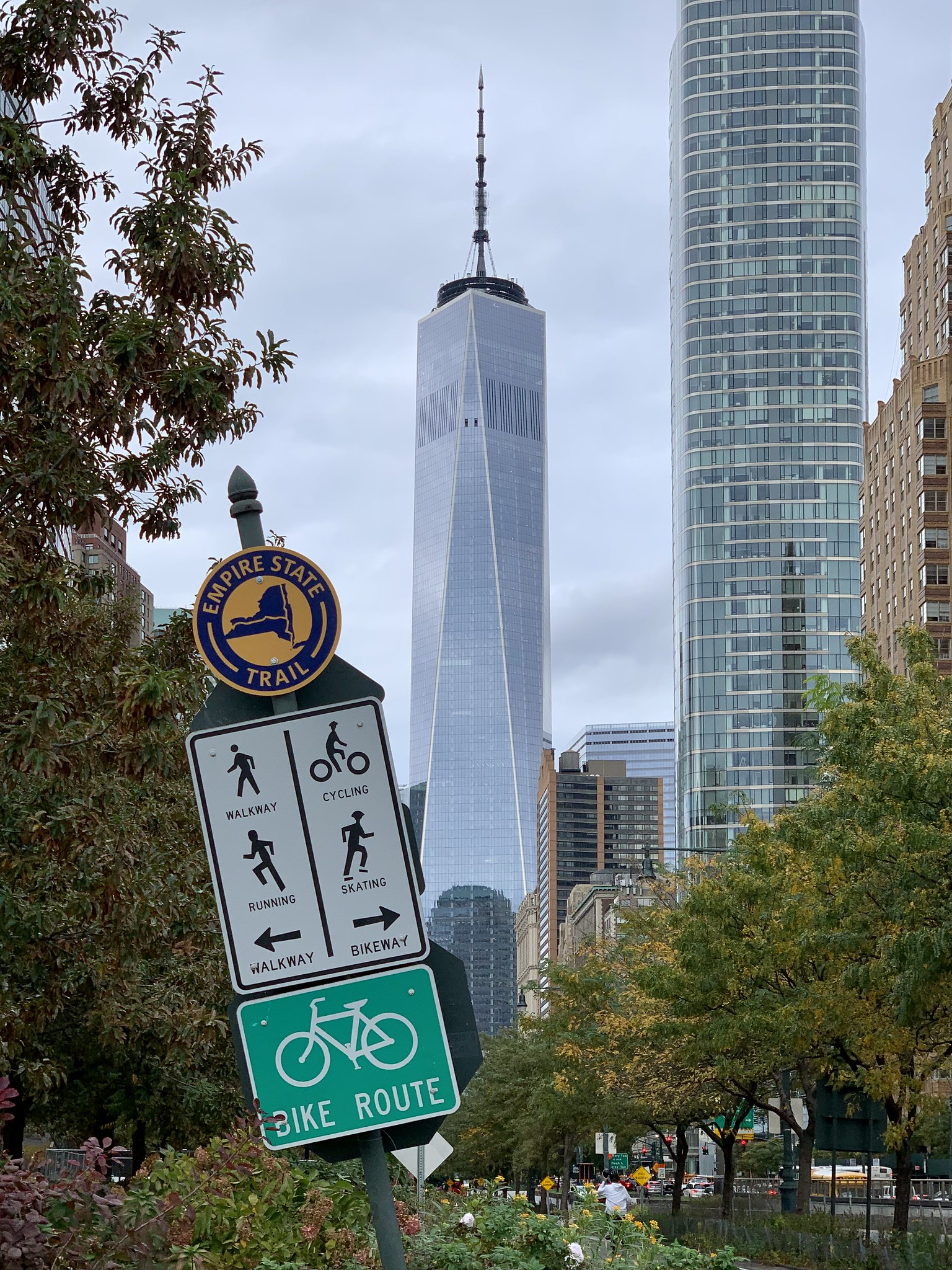
- Signs for Mile 0 at the Hudson River Greenway, south end of Empire State Trail at Battery Place, New York City. The walkway is left of the bikeway.
- Length: 750 mi (1,210 km)
- Location: Buffalo–Albany–Manhattan, Albany–Rouses Point
- Use: Hiking, Biking
- Season: All year
- Website: https://empiretrail.ny.gov/

The Empire State Trail is a multi-use trail in New York State that was proposed in January 2017 and completed in December 2020. The trail runs from Manhattan north to the Canada–United States border in Rouses Point near the northern tip of Lake Champlain, and also from Buffalo to Albany. At 750 miles (1,210 km), it is the longest multi-use trail in the United States. The trail includes pre-existing trail segments, which retain their existing identity but are now co-signed as a segment of the Empire State Trail. The trail also links to other regional bicycling and hiking trails such as the Appalachian Trail, the Adirondack and Catskill Parks, the Great Lakes Seaway Trail, the Genesee Valley Greenway, and others. A segment near its southernmost part, on the Hudson River Greenway in Manhattan, is concurrent with the East Coast Greenway. The trail is used for hiking, biking, snowshoeing, cross-country skiing and in some areas snowmobiling.

Completing the trail required 40 construction projects to create new trails and to eliminate gaps in existing segments. On December 30, 2020, Governor Cuomo announced that these construction projects were finished, and that the Empire State Trail was officially completed and open to the public.

== Route ==
The trail is organized in three main segments: the Hudson River Valley Greenway Trail, the Erie Canalway Trail, and the Champlain Valley Trail.

The Hudson River Valley Greenway runs from New York City (40°42′17.9″N 74°01′01.2″W) to Albany (42°38′45.4″N 73°44′54.2″W) along numerous greenways and rail trails, including the Hudson River Greenway in Manhattan, the North County Trailway and South County Trailway in Westchester County, the Walkway Over the Hudson, the Albany–Hudson Electric Trail, and others. It loosely follows the eastern shore of the Hudson River with a brief section in Ulster County on the western shore. This section of trail is primarily off-road, but contains one significant on-road section between Kingston and Hudson.

The Erie Canalway Trail runs from Buffalo (42°50′45.4″N 78°51′40.2″W) to Albany (via Rochester and Syracuse) along towpaths and rail trails following both the old Erie Canal and the later New York State Canal System. After the completion of the Empire State Trail, this section is almost entirely off-road, with notable on-road gaps remaining between Clyde and Port Byron, Schuyler and Frankfort, and Cohoes and Watervliet.

The Champlain Valley Trail runs from Albany to the Canada–United States border in Rouses Point (45°00′37.2″N 73°22′15.2″W). This section initially follows the Champlain Canal from Albany to Whitehall, and then follows Lake Champlain to Canada. The section along the canal utilizes the Champlain Canalway Trail, but north of Whitehall the trail is entirely on-road, following State Bike Route 9 the rest of the way.

The trail connects 22 counties and many cities throughout the state, including New York City, Buffalo, Albany, and points in between. There is also a proposal to extend the trail from its southern terminus into Long Island.

== Trail maintenance ==
The trail connects existing trail segments operated by a variety of state entities, local governments, and non-profit organizations such as the New York State Canalway Trail, Dutchess Rail Trail, Wallkill Valley Rail Trail and others. The trail maintenance activities continue to be undertaken by the entity that operates each local segment of the larger Empire State Trail.

== Trails included ==
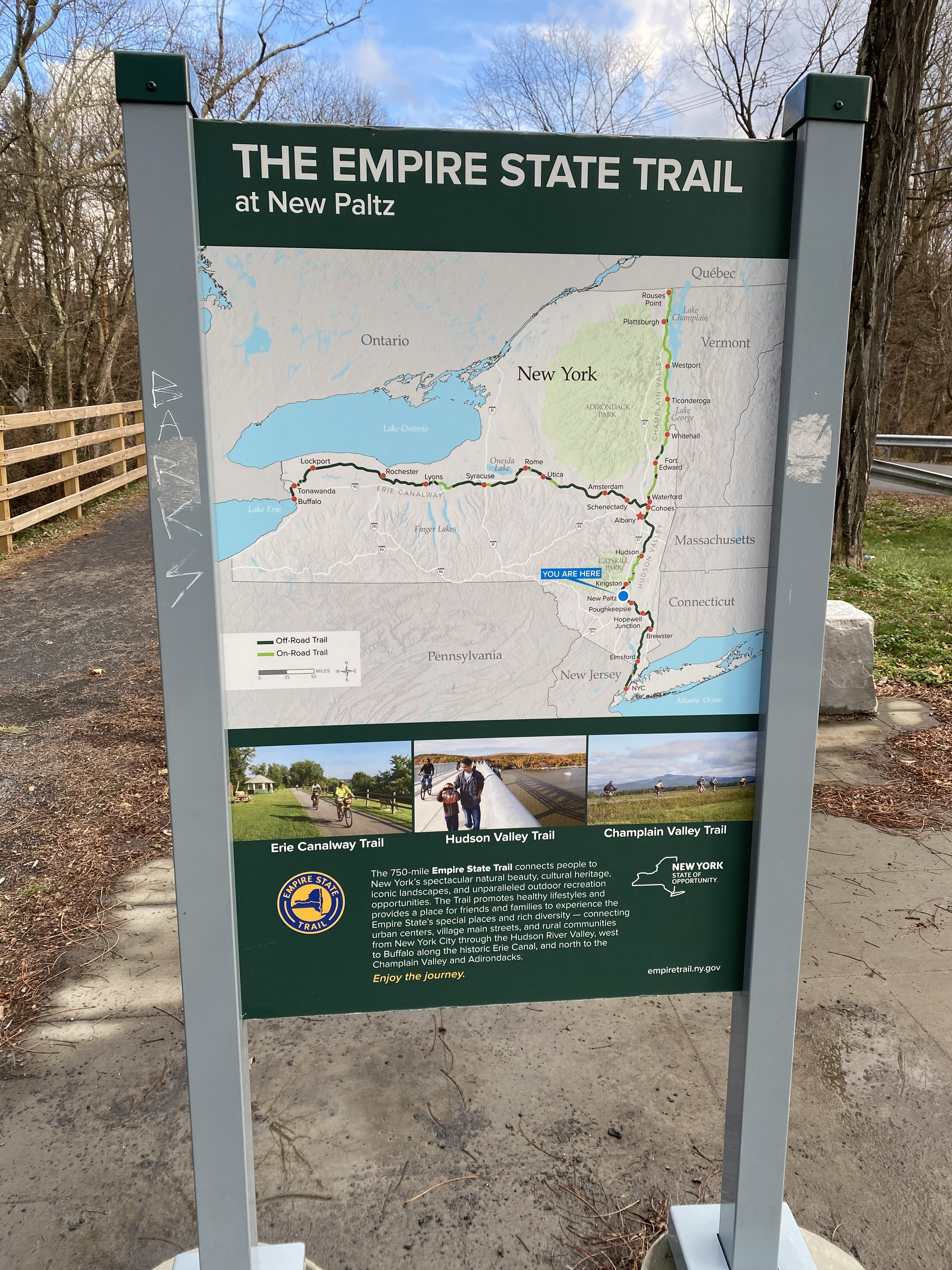
Empire State Trail trailhead at New Paltz

=== Hudson Valley Greenway Trail (New York City to Albany) ===
- Hudson River Greenway
- Putnam Greenway (NYC)
- North County Trailway
- South County Trailway
- Putnam County Trailway
- Maybrook Trailway
- Dutchess Rail Trail
- Walkway over the Hudson
- Hudson Valley Rail Trail
- Wallkill Valley Rail Trail
- Kingston Point Rail Trail
- Albany-Hudson Electric Trail

=== Erie Canalway Trail (Albany to Buffalo) ===
- Mohawk-Hudson Bike-Hike Trail
- New York State Canalway Trail - Erie Canalway Trails
- Onondaga Creekwalk
- Shoreline Trail

=== Champlain Valley Trail (Albany to Champlain) ===
- Mohawk-Hudson Bike-Hike Trail
- New York State Canalway Trail - Champlain Canalway Trails
- Delaware Avenue-Black Bridge Trail - Van Schaick Island
- Terry Gordon Trail

== See also ==
- List of trails in New York
