= List of canals in New York =

This is a list of canals in the state of New York, the artificial waterways built for drainage management or transportation.

== List ==
The following canals have existed in New York, United States.

- Baldwinsville Canal
- Black River Canal
- Cayuga and Seneca Canal
- Champlain Canal
- Chemung Canal
- Chenango Canal
- Chenango Canal Extension
- City Ship Canal
- Clark and Skinner Canal
- Crooked Lake Canal
- Delaware and Hudson Canal
- Erie Canal
- Evans Ship Canal
- Feeder Canal
- Genesee Valley Canal
- Glens Falls Feeder Canal
- Gowanus Canal
- Harlem Ship Canal
- Hydraulic Canal
- Junction Canal
- Little Falls Canal
- Love Canal (drainage)
- Main and Hamburg Canal
- Oneida Lake Canal
- Oneida River Improvement
- Oswego Canal
- Scottsville Canal
- Seneca River Towing-Path
- Shinnecock Canal
- Union Ship Canal

The New York State Canal System currently contains several of these canals.

== Some summaries ==
					C A N A L					L O C K S			
					Length		T o t a l l i f t				Dimensions		
				number of locks									
		Years	Locality	Water	st. mile	km	ft	m	m		ft	m	
	1817												
Erie n° 1	1817		Troy (Albany)	Hudson R.	363	584	676	206		L	90	27,5	
opened	1823		Tonawanda	Niagara	83		drainage divideS			w	15	4,58	
closed			AVERAGES	distance	4,37	7,04	lift		2,48	d	4	1,22	
	1828												
Crooked Lake	1830		Dresden	Seneca Lake	8	13	51	16		L	90	27,5	
opened	1833		Lac Keuka		27					w	15	4,58	wood
closed	1877	44	AVERAGES	distance	0,30	0,48	lift		0,58	d	4	1,22	
Chemung	1830		Havana	Seneca Lake	23	37	36	11		L	90	27,5	
opened	1833		Gibson Corn.	Chemung R.	49					w	15	4,58	wood (?)
closed	1878	45	AVERAGES	distance	0,47	0,76	lift		0,22	d	4	1,22	
	1836												
Genese Valley	1839		Rochester	Canal Erie	124	200	1047	319		L	90	27,5	
opened	1862		Olean	Allegheny	112		drainage divide			w	15	4,58	wood (?)
closed	1878	16	AVERAGES	distance	1,11	1,78	lift		2,85	d	4	1,22	stone
	1828												
Blackriver	1837		Rome	Canal Erie	35	56	1423	434		L	90	27,5	
opened	1855		Carthage	Black River	109		drainage divide			w	15	4,58	
closed	1925	70	AVERAGES	distance	0,32	0,52	lift		3,98	d	4	1,22	
	1835												
Erie n° 2	1836		Troy (Albany)	Fl. Hudson	350	560	571	174		L	110	33,6	
opened	1862		Tonawanda	Niagara	71		drainage divideS			w	18	5,49	
closed			AVERAGES	distance	4,9	7,9	lift		2,10	d	7	2,14	
	1903												
Erie n° 3	1905		Troy (Albany)	Hudson R.	310	499	571	174		L	300	91,5	
(NY Barge Canal)	1918		Tonawanda	Niagara	36		drainage divideS			w	43,5	13,27	
	2021	103	AVERAGES	distance	8,61	13,86	lift		4,84	d	13	3,97	
