= Champlain Valley Trail =

The Champlain Valley Trail is part of the Empire State Trail. It runs from Albany to the Canada–United States border in Rouses Point (45°00′37.2″N 73°22′15.2″W). This section initially follows the Champlain Canal from Albany to Whitehall, and then follows Lake Champlain to Canada. The section along the canal utilizes the Champlain Canalway Trail, but north of Whitehall the trail is entirely on-road, following State Bike Route 9 the rest of the way. It contains the Mohawk-Hudson Bike-Hike Trail, the New York State Canalway Trail - Champlain Canalway Trails, the Delaware Avenue-Black Bridge Trail - Van Schaick Island, and the Terry Gordon Trail.

It was completed in 2020 with the rest of the Empire State Trail. This trail system required several new trails, or construction projects filling in gaps.
