= Albany County Helderberg-Hudson Rail Trail =

Trail in New York

Coordinates: 42.6277°N 73.7671°W

- Length: 9.8 miles (15.8 km)
- Location: Albany County, New York
- Trailheads: Albany, Delmar, Slingerlands, Voorheesville
- Use: Biking, inline skating, walking, cross-country skiing
- Difficulty: Fairly easy, level, ADA-accessible
- Season: All year, dawn to dusk
- Surface: Asphalt
- Right of way: Albany and Susquehanna Railroad
- Website: https://www.albanycounty.com/departments/recreation/albany-county-helderberg-hudson-rail-trail

The 9.8-mile (15.8 km) Albany County Helderberg-Hudson Rail Trail is located in Albany County, New York, United States. Starting in the South End of the city of Albany, it connects to the communities of Delmar and Slingerlands before ending in the village of Voorheesville. In Albany, the trail directly connects to the South End Bikeway, which connects to Downtown Albany and the Mohawk-Hudson Bike-Hike Trail - a part of both the Erie Canalway Trail and Empire State Trail systems.

The trail was first announced in 2010, with the section from Delmar to Slingerlands built using stone dust the following year. The section from Albany to Slingerlands was paved in 2016, and the paving was extended to Voorheesville in 2018. By the end of 2018, the trail was complete.

The Albany County Rail Trail has become a popular trail in the Capital Region. In 2016, approximately 164,000 people used the trail in Delmar - this was right after that segment was paved but before being completed out to Voorheesville. In the Capital Region, this number is only bested by the Mohawk-Hudson Bike-Hike Trail.

The trail is owned, operated, and maintained by the Albany County government.
