= New York State Canalway Trail =

Recreation trails along the NY State Canal System

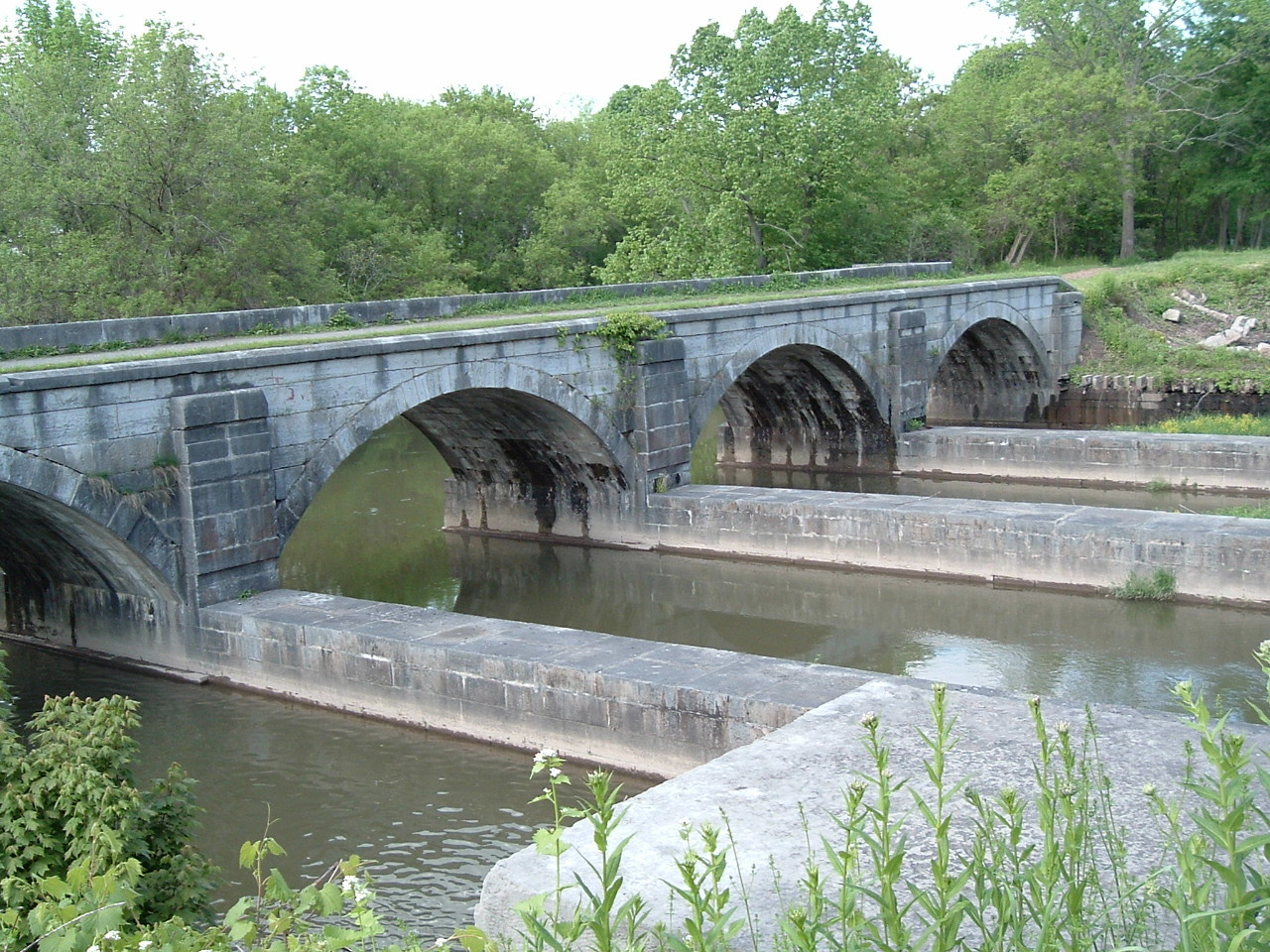
The Nine Mile Creek Aqueduct in the Camillus Erie Canal park. The arches now support a tow path trail.

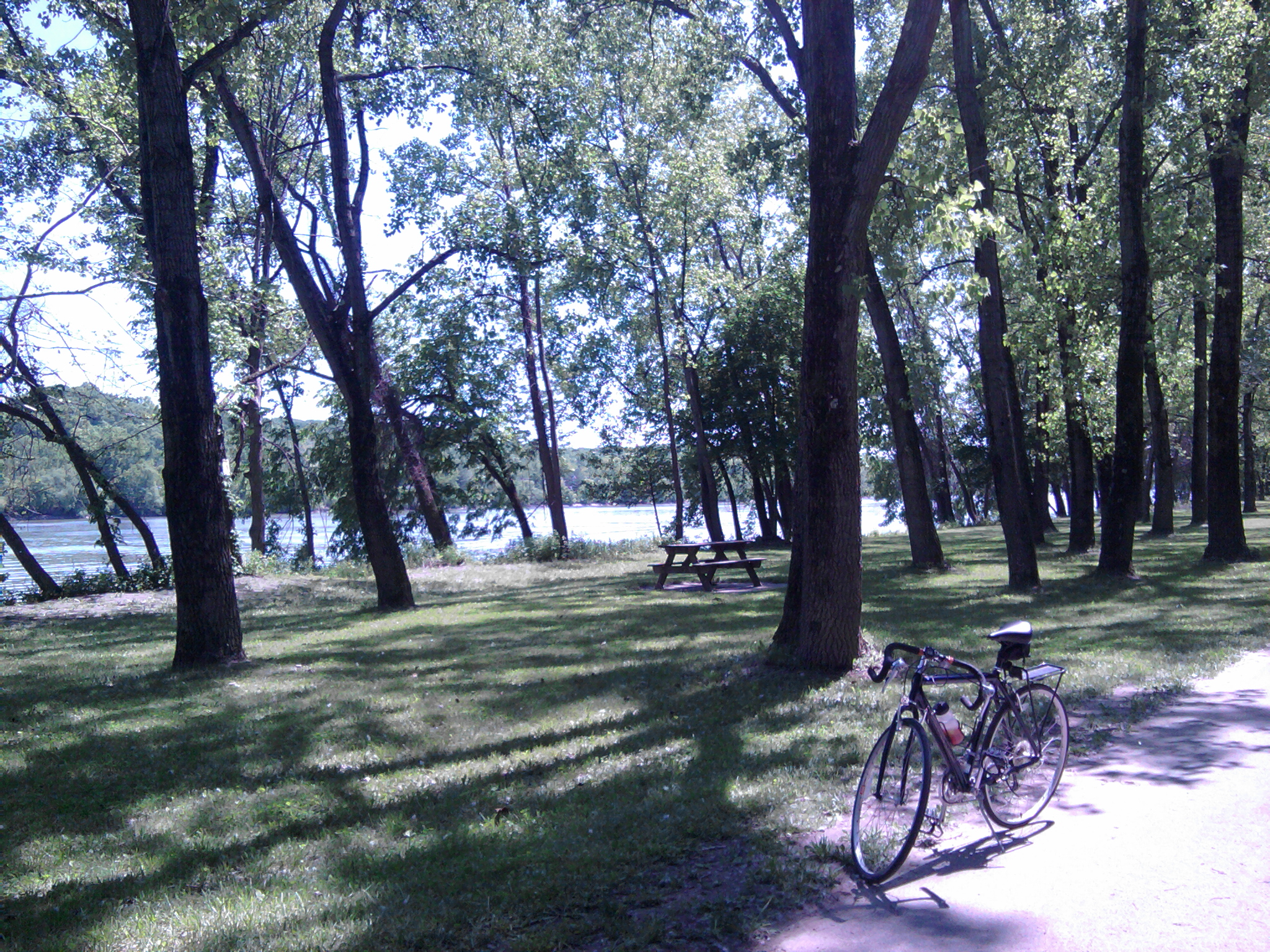
A picnic area on the Mohawk Hudson Bike/Hike Trail, along the Hudson River

The New York State Canalway Trail is a network of multi-use trails that runs parallel to current or former sections of the Erie, Oswego, Cayuga-Seneca, and Champlain canals. When completed, the system will have 524 miles (843 km) of trails following current and former sections of the canals. The longest of these is the 365 miles (587 km) long Erie Canalway Trail. The Erie and Champlain Canalway Trails are also part of the statewide Empire State Trail system.

A partnership of national, state, local and non-profit organizations is working to complete a continuous system of trails along these canals. Among the organizations involved are Parks & Trails New York, the New York State Canal Corporation and the Erie Canalway National Heritage Corridor.

Before the railroad era, New York had an extensive network of canals. As commercial freight shifted away from canals and towards rail and highways, communities along the canals needed new ways to generate commerce. In 1995, the Canal Corporation issued a recreation plan, which offered a view of the Canal as a linear park, including trails linking communities along the trail. Biking, hiking, snowmobiling, cross-country skiing, horseback riding, canoeing, and fishing are among activities promoted.

The original canals were flanked by towpaths, where mules walked while pulling barges through the canals. Many of the canalway trails follow former towpaths. Some trails follow canals that are still in use, serving mostly recreational boating. Other towpath trails pass by the ruins of abandoned locks and other structures. Many communities along the canal have made progress in establishing parks, improving towpaths and raising funds for restoration of old canal structures such as locks and aqueducts.

In 1973, three segments of towpath were converted into recreational trail; Lockport to Rochester, Pittsford to Fairport and the extension of Old Erie Canal State Park in Oneida County.

As of 2021, the Erie Canalway Trail is 100% complete. As part of the Empire State Trail project, the remaining gaps in the trail were filled and completed, both on-road and off-road, by the end of 2020.

Some of the individual sections are included below:

== Erie Canalway trails ==
Segments are listed from west to east.

Section name	Begin and end points	Length	Surface	Comments
Erie Canal Heritage Trail	Buffalo to Newark	114 miles	Paved, stone dust	
Old Erie Canal	Port Byron to Camillus	28 miles	Stone dust	Includes Camillus Erie Canal Park and restored aqueduct at Nine Mile Creek
Old Erie Canal State Historic Park	Dewitt to Rome	36 miles	Paved, stone dust	
	Rome to Utica	30 miles	Paved, stone dust	
Mohawk Hudson Bike/Hike Trail	Little Falls to Albany	86 miles	Asphalt	East end of Erie Canalway, connects to Hudson River Valley Greenway Trail

== Other trails ==
Section name	Begin and end points	Length	Surface	Comments
Old Champlain Canal Trail	Waterford	3 miles	Stone dust, soil	Starts at the junction of the former Champlain Canal and the Erie Canal
Glens Falls Feeder Canal Trail	Glens Falls	9 miles		
