= Hudson river greenway =

Hudson River Greenway may refer to:

- Hudson River Valley Greenway, a system of parks, trails, kayak/canoe routes, etc. along New York's Hudson River, and the organization that serves to promote and preserve them

- Manhattan Waterfront Greenway, a multi-use trail and linear park along Manhattan's Hudson River shoreline
