= Niskayuna station =

Niskayuna
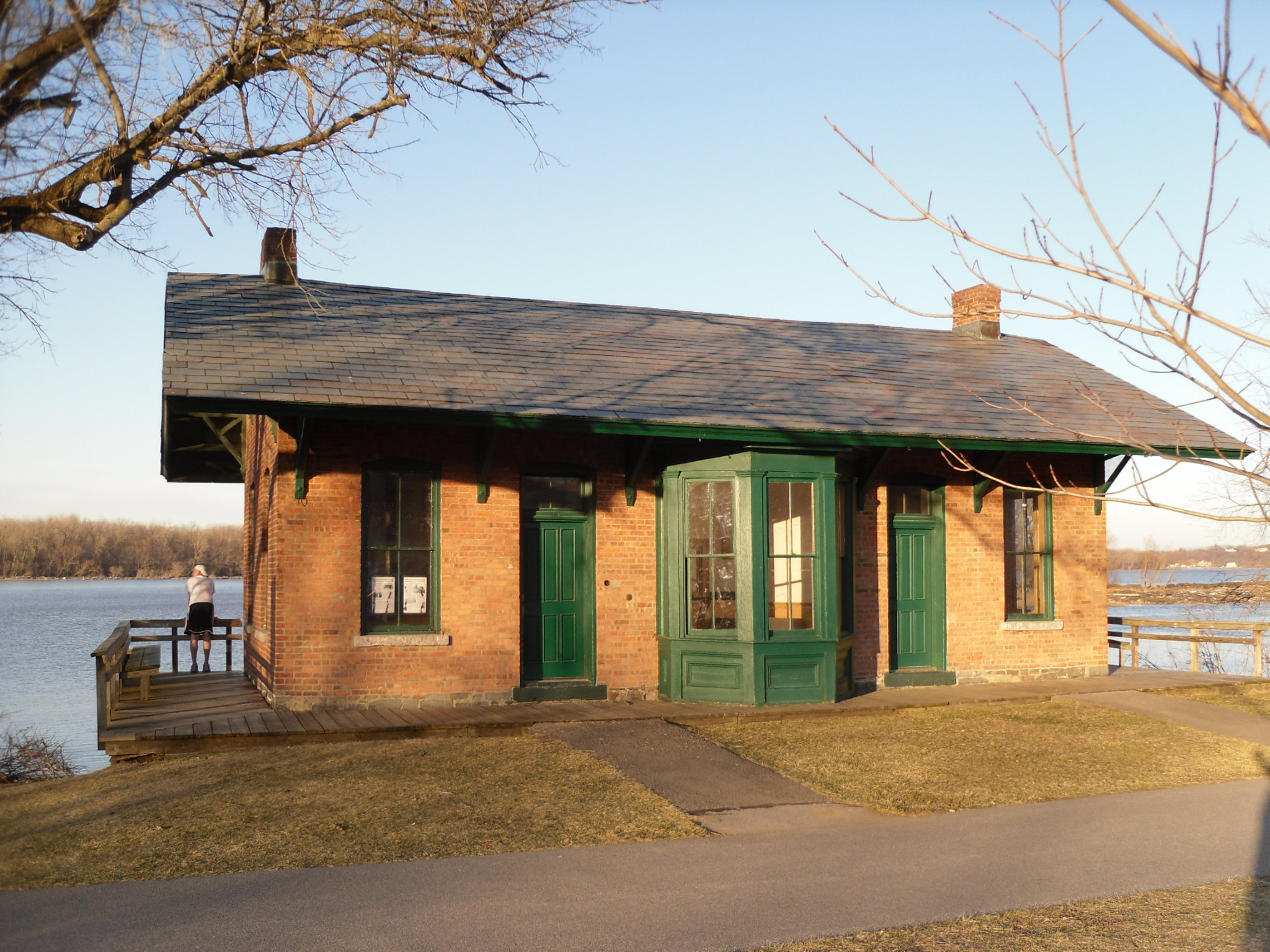
- Niskayuna station in March 2010

General information
- Location: Niskayuna, Schenectady County, New York

Former services
Preceding station	New York Central Railroad	Following station
Aqueduct toward Schenectady	Schenectady – Troy	Mohawk View toward Troy
- Niskayuna Railroad Station
- U.S. National Register of Historic Places
- Location within New York Location within the United States
- Nearest city: Niskayuna, New York
- Coordinates: 42°46′47″N 73°49′25″W
- Area: less than one acre
- Built: 1843
- NRHP reference No.: 07001205
- Added to NRHP: November 19, 2007
Location

Niskayuna station is a historic railway station located at Niskayuna in Schenectady County, New York. It was possibly built in 1843 by the Schenectady and Troy Railroad and renovated or replaced in the 1880s. It is a one-story, rectangular, red brick masonry building on a foundation of rough cut quarry stone. It has a gable roof with broad eaves that cover the platform area. The rear wall of the station is situated directly upon the current, steep bank of the Mohawk River. It ceased to be used as a railroad facility in 1964, then was converted to a single family residence. It has been acquired by the town of Niskayuna as part of the Mohawk Hudson Hike/Bike Trail along the former railroad bed.

It was listed on the National Register of Historic Places in 2007 as Niskayuna Railroad Station.
