= Oneida River =

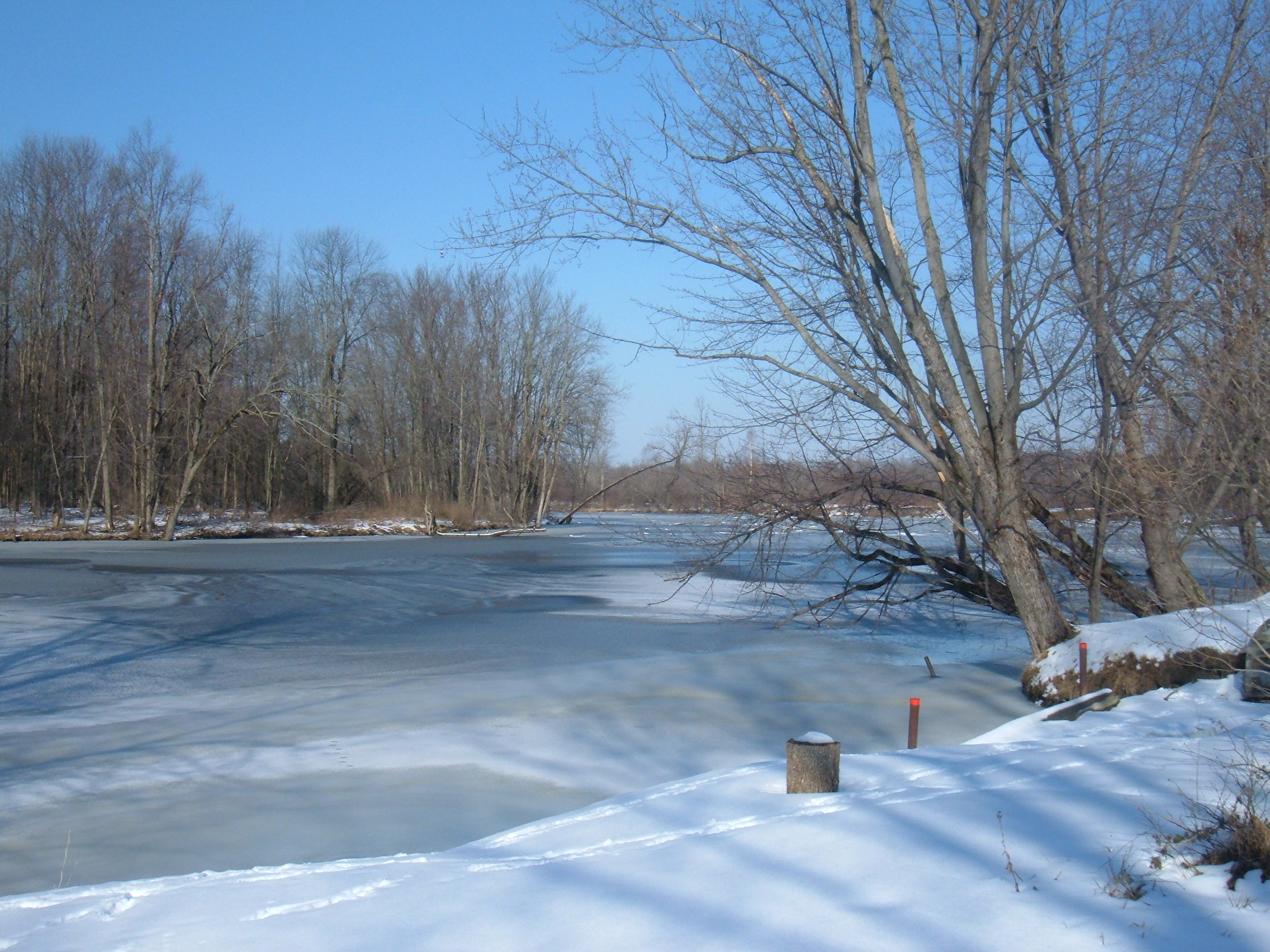
- A view of the frozen Oneida River in winter.

Location
- Country: United States
- State: New York
- Region: Central New York
- Counties: Onondaga, Oswego

Physical characteristics
- Source: Oneida Lake
  - location: Brewerton
  - coordinates: 43°14′24″N 76°08′26″W
- Mouth: Oswego River
  - location: Clay, New York
  - coordinates: 43°12′04″N 76°16′49″W
- Length: 18 mi (29 km)
- Discharge
  - location: Euclid, New York
  - average: 2,997 cu ft/s (84.9 m^{3}/s)

The Oneida River is a river that forms a portion of the boundary between Oswego and Onondaga counties in central New York. The river flows 18 miles (29 km) from Oneida Lake's outlet to its confluence with the Seneca River, where the two rivers combine to form the Oswego River that empties into Lake Ontario.

The river was known to the Onondaga people as Sah-eh, and was referred to during the colonial era as the Onondaga River.

The river is utilized for boating and shipping as part of the New York State Barge Canal.

== See also ==
- List of New York rivers
- Oswego Canal
