= Oswego River (New York) =

River in upstate New York

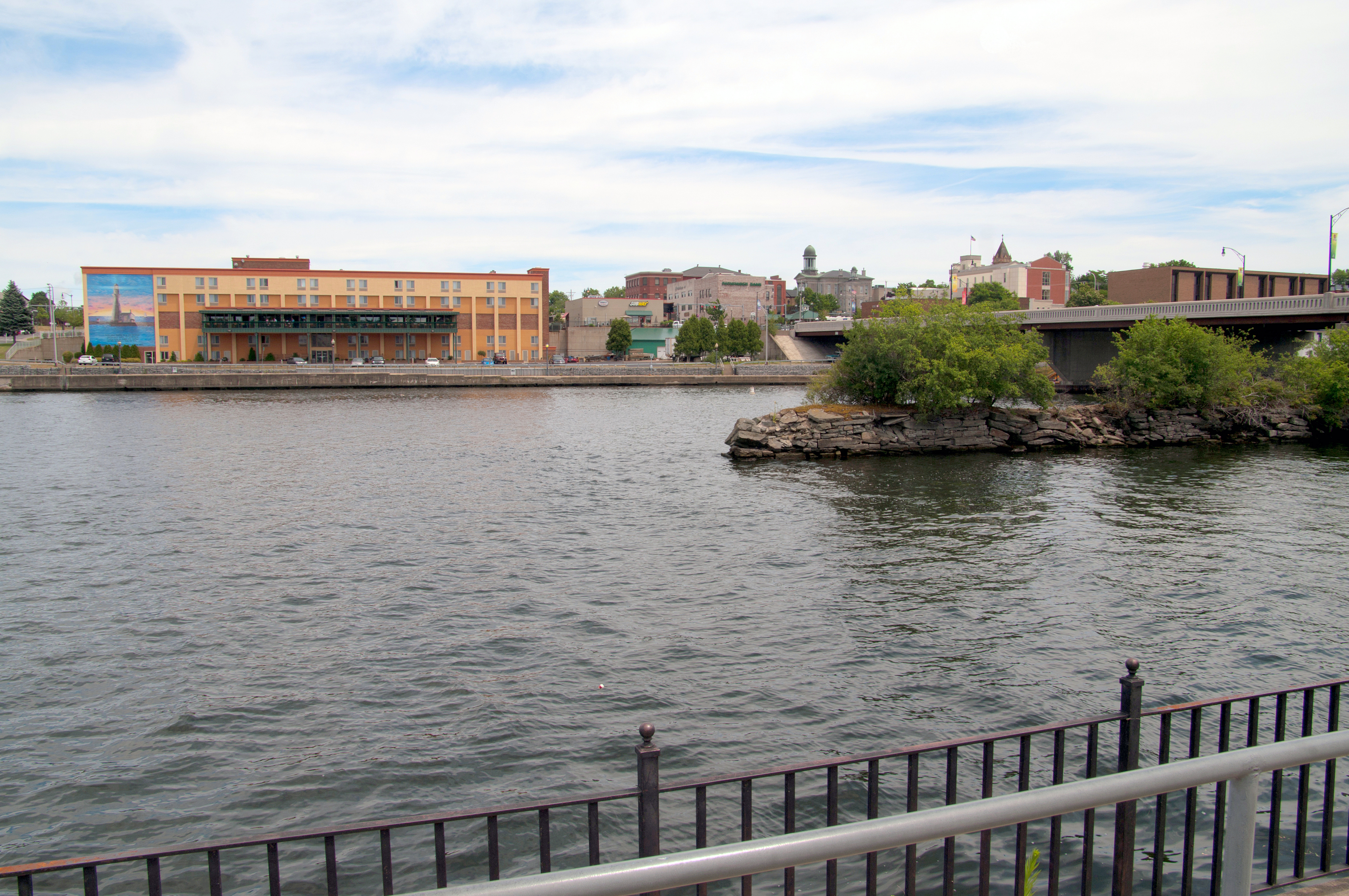
- The Oswego River as it passes through the city of Oswego.

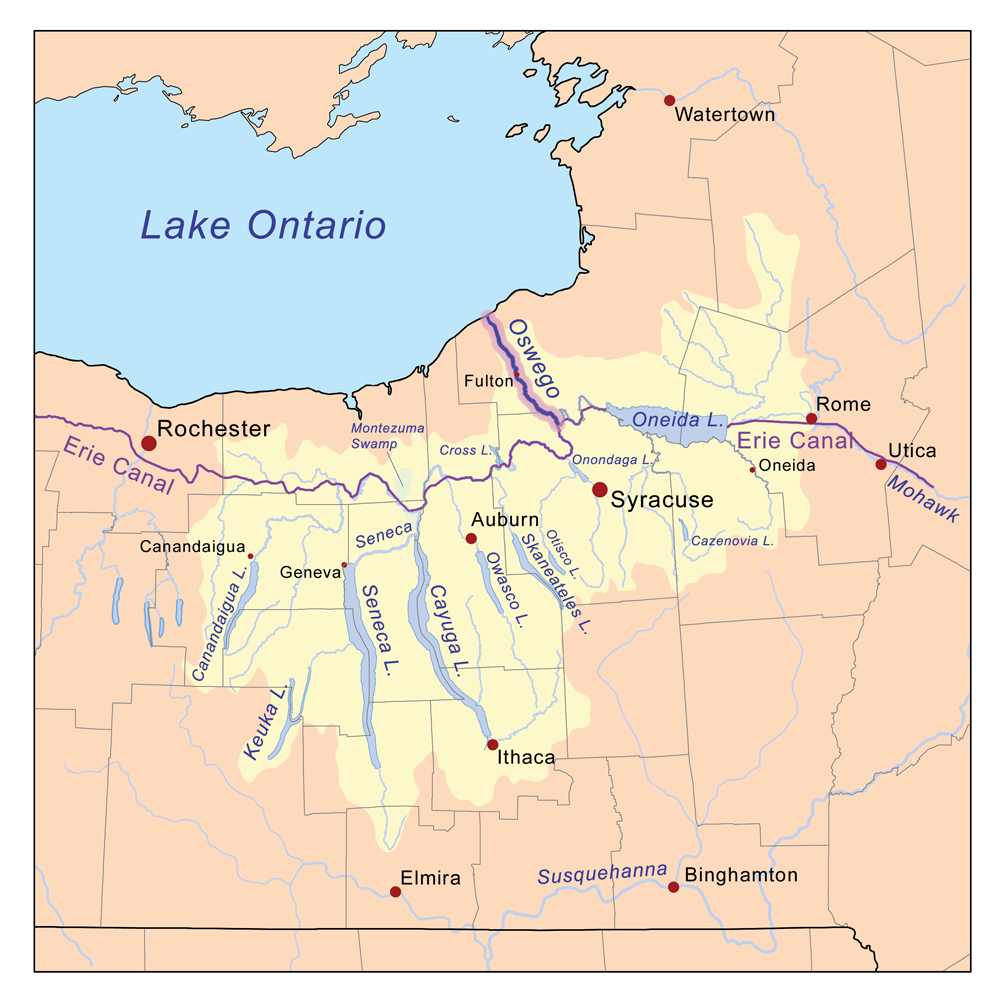
- The Oswego drainage basin, with the Oswego River highlighted

Location
- Country: United States
- State: New York
- Counties: Onondaga, Oswego
- City: Oswego

Physical characteristics
- Source: Seneca River
  - location: Geneva
  - coordinates: 42°52′05″N 76°56′27″W
  - elevation: 443 ft (135 m)
- 2nd source: Oneida River
  - location: Brewerton
  - coordinates: 43°14′24″N 76°08′26″W
- Source confluence
  - location: Northwest of Syracuse
  - coordinates: 43°12′5″N 76°16′50″W
  - elevation: 357 ft (109 m)
- Mouth: Lake Ontario
  - location: Oswego
  - coordinates: 43°27′54″N 76°30′50″W
  - elevation: 245 ft (75 m)
- Basin size: 5,122 sq mi (13,270 km^{2})
- Discharge
  - location: Oswego
  - average: 6,912 cu ft/s (195.7 m^{3}/s)
  - minimum: 261 cu ft/s (7.4 m^{3}/s)(September 18, 1985)
  - maximum: 37,000 cu ft/s (1,000 m^{3}/s)(March 28, 1936)

The Oswego River (/ɒsˈwiːɡoʊ/) is a river in upstate New York in the United States. It is the second-largest river (after the Niagara River) flowing into Lake Ontario. James Fenimore Cooper’s novel The Pathfinder, or The Inland Sea is set in the Oswego River valley.

The name Oswego is a Mohawk name that means "flowing out", or specifically, "small water flowing into that which is large".

== Description ==
James Fenimore Cooper described the Oswego in these words:

The Oswego is formed by the junction of the Oneida and the Onondaga, (Note: The river downstream of Onondaga Lake is now considered to be the Seneca before it meets the Oneida.) both of which flow from lakes; and it pursues its way, through a gently undulating country, some eight or ten miles, until it reaches the margin of a sort of natural terrace, down which it tumbles some ten or fifteen feet, to another level, across which it glides with the silent, stealthy progress of deep water, until it throws its tribute into the broad receptacle of the Ontario.

== River course ==
The Oswego River starts at the confluence of the Oneida River (flowing from Oneida Lake) and the Seneca River (flowing from Seneca Lake, Cayuga Lake, and Montezuma Marsh). The river drains an area of 5,122 square miles (13,266 km^{2}), as large as the states of Rhode Island and Delaware together, comprising most of the Finger Lakes region of upstate New York.

At its mouth at Lake Ontario, the river divides the City of Oswego, just as it divides the City of Fulton 11 miles upstream.

=== Oswego Canal ===
Part of its length the Oswego Canal was built. The Oswego River also serves as a part of the New York State Canal System, providing a route from the Erie Canal to Lake Ontario. This section of the canal was completed in 1827, two years after completion of the Erie Canal. In 1917, as part of a general overhaul of the canal system, the Oswego Canal was deepened and refurbished. The canal is now 14 feet (4.3 m) deep and has an overhead clearance of 20 feet (6.1 m). In the Oswego Canal, there is a series of locks and dams along the river. It allows ships to pass despite elevation changes between Three Rivers and Lake Ontario.

== Watershed ==
The Oswego River is part of the Great Lakes watershed and drains a large basin that collects water from rivers, lakes, and surrounding land. The Oswego River drains large portions of central New York and flows north into Lake Ontario.

The Oswego River Basin covers up to 5,100 sq miles and includes three provinces. The Appalachian Plateau, the Tug Hill Plateau, and the Lake Ontario Plain. It goes through a series of rivers, lakes, and canals before it even reaches the Oswego River.

== History ==
The Oswego River was important for transportation. In 1727, Fort Oswego was built by the British near where the river flows into Lake Ontario. It became a trading and military outpost. During the French and Indian War, the French forces seized it and destroyed the fort in 1756.

The Oswego Canal was completed in 1827 and connected to the Erie Canal and contributed to the development of Oswego, New York, as a port of Lake Ontario.

== Pollution ==
During the 1900s, the pollution in the Oswego River increased due to industrial activity, urban runoff, and sewage waste discharge. The contaminants found in the area degraded water quality and impacted fish and wildlife. In 1987, the Oswego River and harbor were Great Lakes Areas of Concern in the Great Lakes Water Quality Agreement between the United States and Canada as part of an effort to address the pollution in the Great Lakes. Cleanup efforts focused on reducing pollutant discharge and restoring the habitat. It was formally removed on July 21, 2006.

== Sportfishing ==
The river is known for its steelhead run in the early spring, followed by a salmon run in early autumn. The river is stocked annually by the New York State Department of Environmental Conservation with 140,000 Chinook salmon and 20,000 steelhead. These fish runs attract anglers to the Oswego River, making it a popular fishing spot for sport fishing. There are 11 access points to publicly fish. There are over a dozen game fish species to target.

During the winter months, the City of Oswego puts out an ice fishing ban on the Oswego River because of safety concerns. There are strong currents under the frozen ice sheets that put anglers in danger if they were to fall through the ice.

== See also ==
- List of New York rivers
