= New York State Canal Corporation =

Public-benefit corporation

New York State public benefit corporation overview
- Jurisdiction: Administration of the New York State Canal System, including the Erie, Champlain, Oswego and Cayuga-Seneca canals
- Headquarters: Administrative Headquarters; 30 South Pearl St. Albany, NY 12207
- New York State public benefit corporation executive: Director
- Website: canals.ny.gov

The New York State Canal Corporation is a New York State public-benefit corporation responsible for the oversight, administration and maintenance of the New York State Canal System, which consists of the Erie Canal, Cayuga–Seneca Canal, Oswego Canal and Champlain Canal. It is also involved with the development and maintenance of the New York State Canalway Trail and with the general development and promotion of the Erie Canal Corridor as both a tourist attraction and a working waterway. The canal system totals 524 miles in length, and includes 57 locks and 17 lift bridges. The corporation suggests that canal boat travelers reserve 5 days to traverse the Erie Canal portion of the system.

== Organization ==
Executive officers report to a 7-member board of directors. For 2018, the board approved an expenditures budget of $82 million for operations and maintenance, $40 million for capital expenditures, and $3 million for Canal Development Fund expenses.

In 2012, the New York State Canal Corporation employed 529 people, consisting of 458 full-time employees and 78 seasonal workers. Its spending accounted for about 10 percent of the New York State Thruway's total $1.1 billion in annual spending. In 2012, the Canal Corp.’s operating budget was $55.7 million and its capital budget was $51.4 million. An August 2012 report by state Comptroller Thomas DiNapoli said the canal system "contributed to the deterioration of the Authority's financial condition over the past decade", even as canal traffic had dropped nearly one-third since the period immediately before the Thruway Authority assumed control.

== Ownership changes ==
In May 2006, Governor George Pataki proposed recreating the New York State Canal Corporation by 2010 as an independent agency no longer under the oversight of the New York State Thruway. This did not come to pass. The New York Power Authority has been financially responsible for the Canal Corporation since April 2016 and has owned it since January 1, 2017.

== Controversy ==
In 2004, it was discovered that officials of the Canal Corporation had attempted to sell private development rights to large stretches of the Old Erie Canal to a single developer for a mere $30,000, far less than the land was worth on the open market. After an investigation by Syracuse's Post-Standard newspaper and much public criticism, governor George Pataki later quietly canceled the deal.

== See also ==
- Albany Port District Commission
- New York State Thruway Authority
