= Mohawk-Hudson Bike-Hike Trail =

Trail in New York state, United States

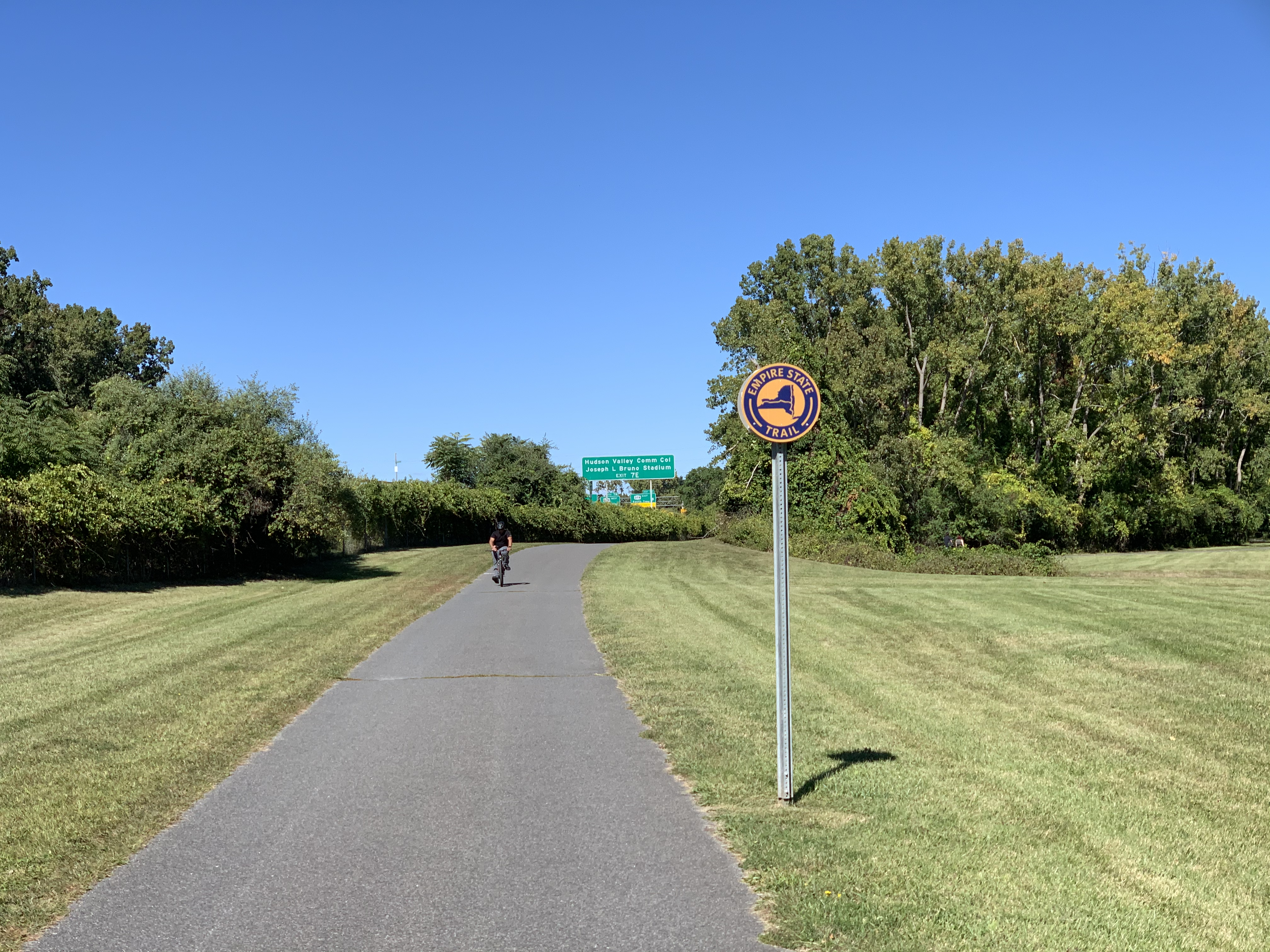
- The Mohawk-Hudson Bike-Hike Trail in Menands.
- Length: 97 miles (156 km)
- Location: Frankfort to Albany, New York
- Trailheads: Frankfort, Ilion, Mohawk, Little Falls, Fort Plain, Canojaharie, Fultonville, Amsterdam, Pattersonville, Kiwanis Park in Rotterdam, Schenectady County Community College, Blatnick Park in Niskayuna, Lions Park in Niskayuna, Colonie Town Park in Colonie, Alexander Street in Cohoes, Hudson Shores Park in Watervliet, 4th Street Park in Watervliet, Corning Preserve in Albany
- Use: Biking, inline skating, walking, cross-country skiing
- Difficulty: Mostly easy, level, ADA-accessible, with isolated steep grades and occasional on-road sections
- Season: All year, dawn to dusk
- Surface: Asphalt
- Right of way: Troy and Schenectady Branch (Cohoes-Schenectady), West Shore Railroad main line (Pattersonville-Little Falls)

The Mohawk-Hudson Bike-Hike Trail (MHBHT) is a 97-mile (156 km) trail in New York's Mohawk Valley and Capital District regions. It is also the easternmost segment of the Erie Canalway Trail, as well as a portion of the Empire State Trail.

== History and route ==
The trail starts on the west bank of the Hudson River just south of Albany's Corning Preserve (42°38′31.9″N 73°45′2.3″W), and travels northward alongside Interstate 787 to Watervliet. From there, an on-road bike route connects through Watervliet, Green Island and Cohoes to the Mohawk River section. The trail continues west from Cohoes along the Mohawk River with occasional on-road segments, connecting the communities of Colonie, Niskayuna, Schenectady, Pattersonville, Amsterdam, Fultonville, Canajoharie, Fort Plain, Little Falls, Mohawk, and Ilion before ending in Frankfort (43°1′25.4″N 75°03′12.1″W). From here, the Erie Canalway Trail continues westward on local roads towards Utica before continuing on to western New York and eventually ending in Buffalo.

Much of the trail is a rail trail, created from portions of the Troy and Schenectady Branch, much of which was abandoned in 1964–1965. Most of the portion from the Northway to Schenectady was still owned by the Penn Central railroad as of 1973.

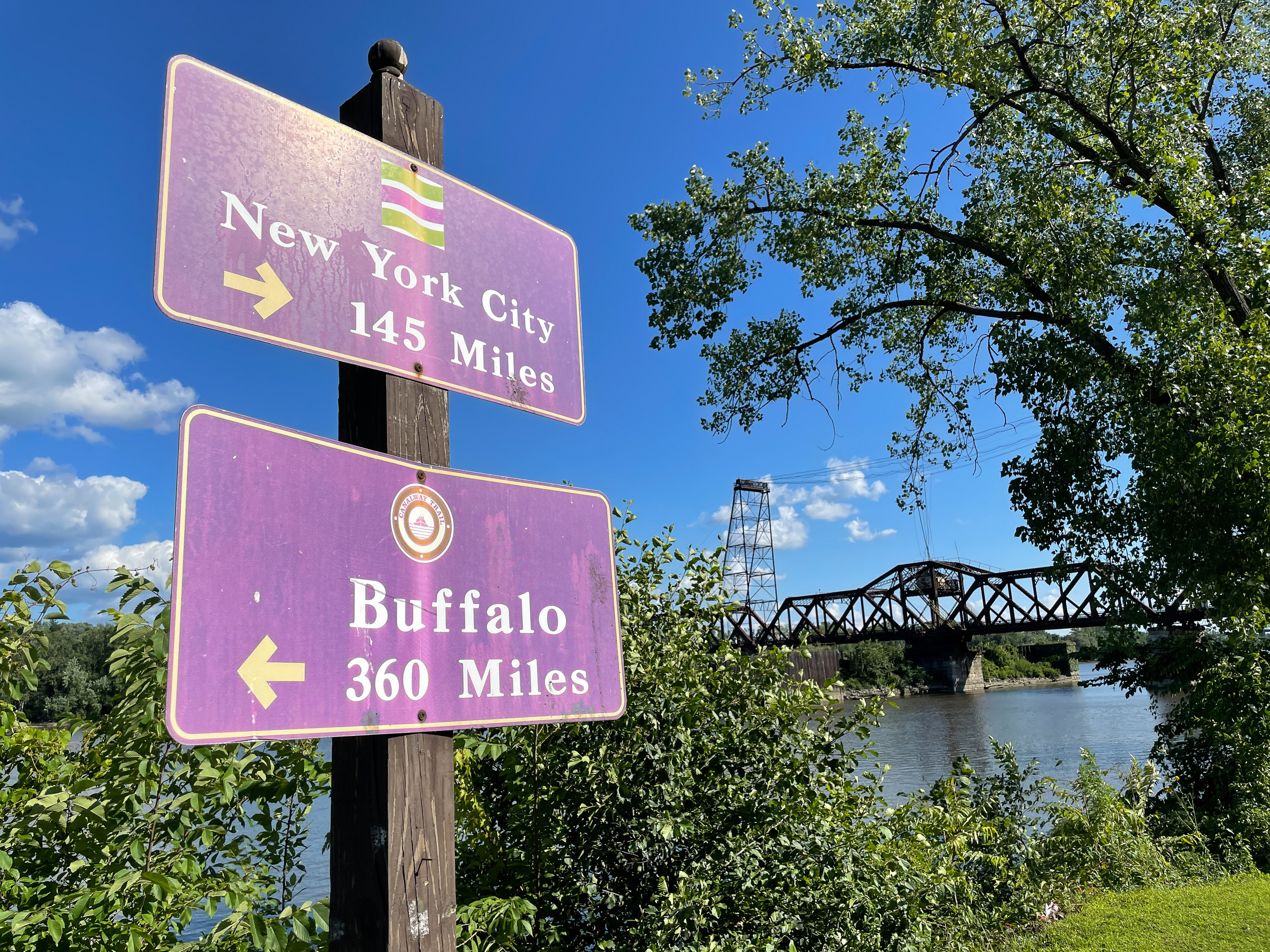
Trail sign in Albany

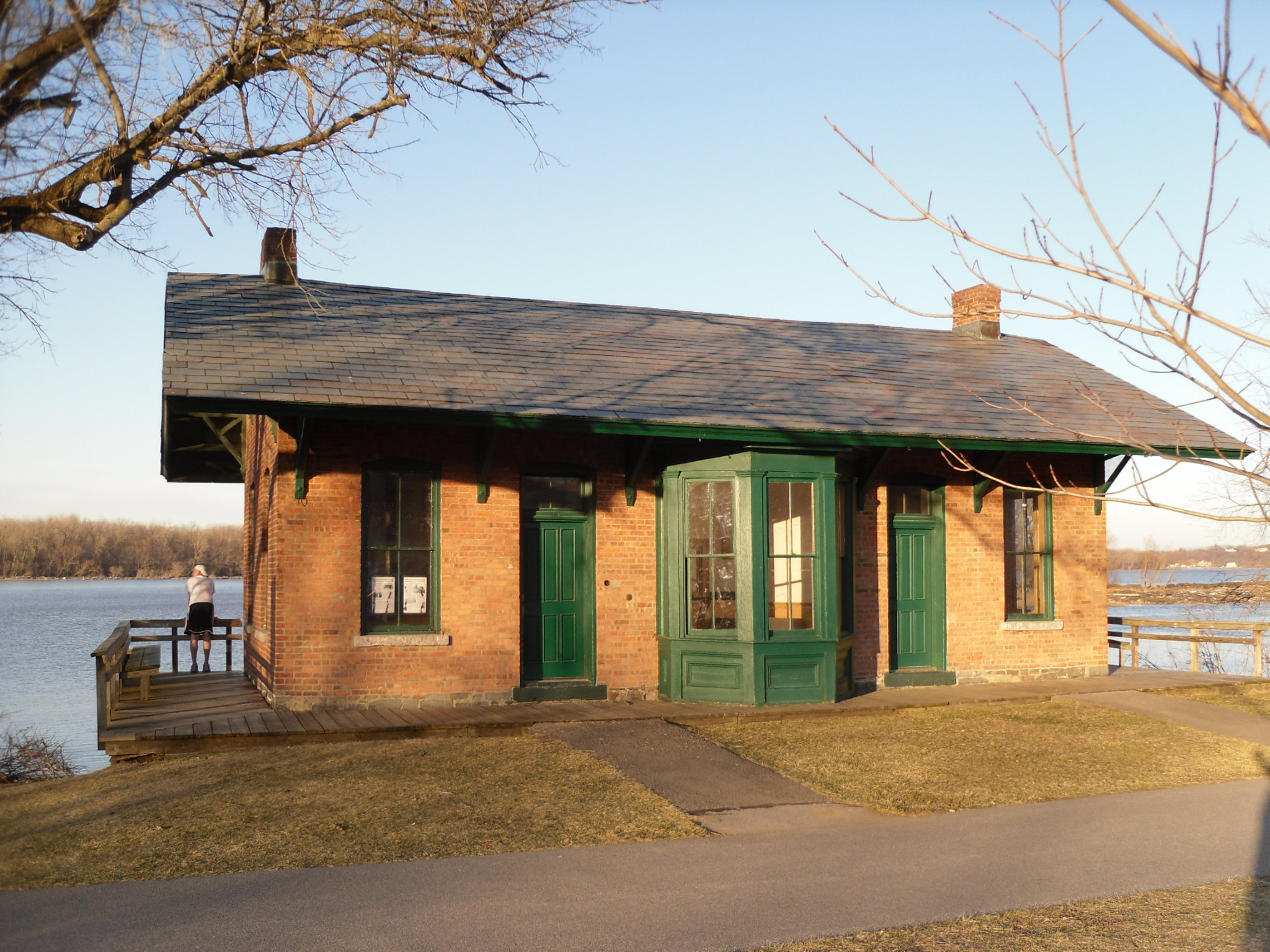
Former Niskayuna Railroad Station along the trail

The first four-mile section opened in 1977 followed by a section to Rotterdam. The trail was selected for the first federal rail to trails grant in 1977 among eight other trails.

While the trail is nearing completion, there are still a few gaps in the trail where it follows local roads. One such section follows Island View Road under the Thaddeus Kosciusko Bridge, which carries Interstate 87 over the Mohawk River, and another follows local roads through the city of Cohoes and the village of Green Island. Another on-road section follows local roads through the Stockade Historic District in Schenectady. Many of the pre-existing gaps were filled by the end of 2020 as part of the Empire State Trail project.

The Mohawk-Hudson Bike-Hike Trail is the backbone of the trail network of the Capital District, with direct connections to the Albany County Helderberg-Hudson Rail Trail, the Black Bridge Trail, the Champlain Canalway Trail, the ALCO Heritage Trail, the Uncle Sam Trail, and the Albany-Hudson Electric Trail. It is generally regarded as the Capital District's premier linear park, and is by far the most heavily used, based on a 2016 survey of trail users. An estimated 264,000 people use the trail per year at Lions Park in Niskayuna, and an estimated 203,000 use the trail per year at the Corning Preserve in Albany.

Bathrooms are available at Rotterdam Kiwanis Park, Jeff Blatnick Town Park (seasonal), Niskayuna Lions Park (seasonal), Colonie Town Park (seasonal), and the Corning Preserve. The trail also includes many benches, picnic facilities, and parking areas.
