= Schenectady and Troy Railroad =

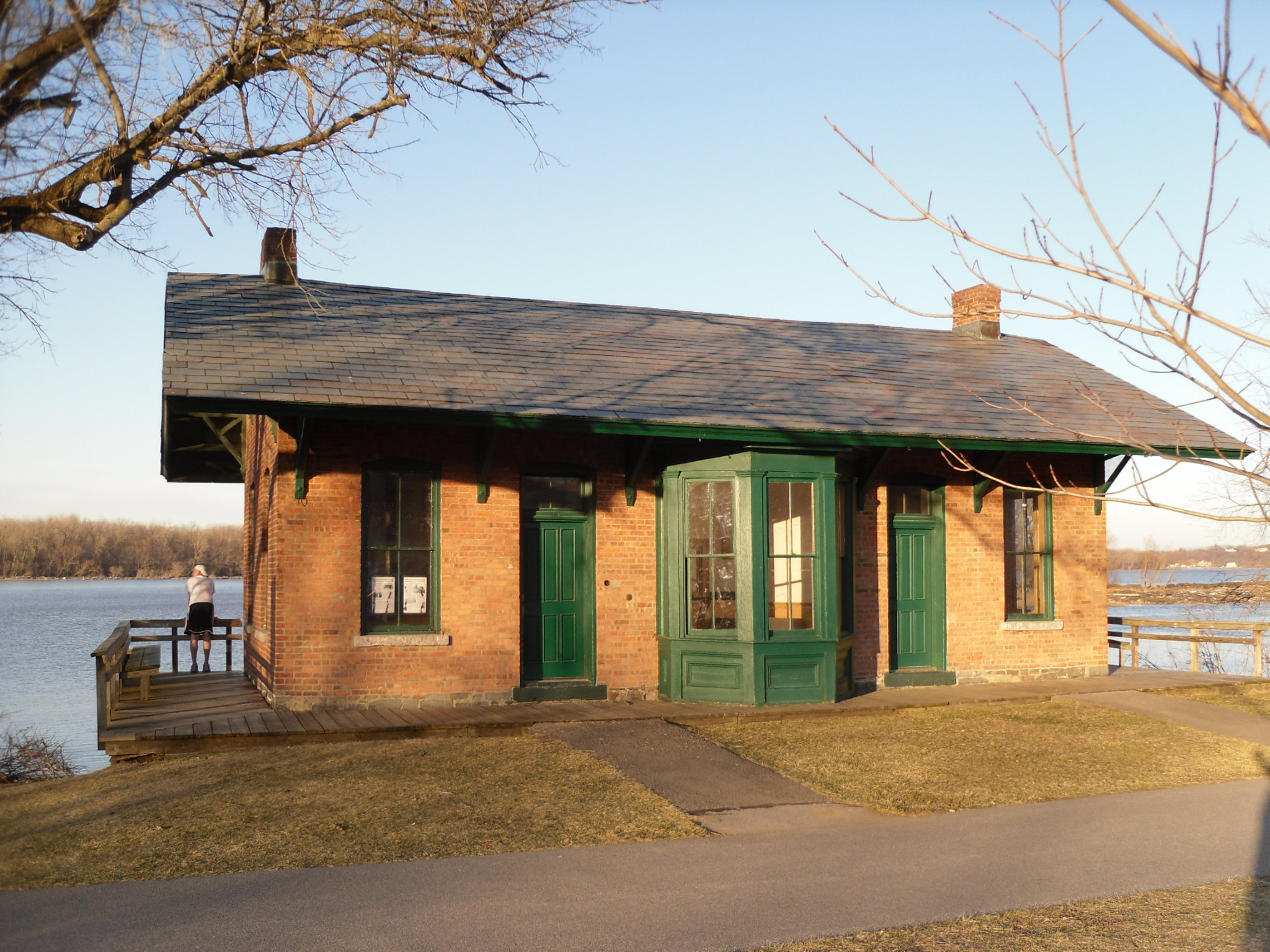
- Restored station in Niskayuna, Mohawk River behind. There were operator-agents at Aqueduct, Niskayuna, and Crescent

Overview
- Dates of operation: 1836–1853
- Successor: New York Central Railroad

Technical
- Track gauge: 1,435 mm (4 ft 8 1/2 in)
- Length: 20.91 miles (33.65 km)

The Schenectady and Troy Railroad was a railroad company in the United States. It was incorporated in 1836 and opened a line between its two namesake cities in 1842. It was consolidated with the first New York Central Railroad in 1853.

== History ==
The Schenectady and Troy Railroad was incorporated on May 21, 1836. The city of Troy gained stock control of the company in 1838, possibly the first example of a municipally-controlled railroad in the United States. The building of the road began in 1841, and trains began running from Schenectady to Troy, New York in November 1842. The completed line was 20.91 miles (33.65 km) long. The company did not build its own bridge over the Hudson River and instead obtained trackage rights over the bridge of the Rensselaer and Saratoga Railroad. The company was consolidated with nine other railroads to form the first New York Central Railroad on May 17, 1853.

== Line ==
Under the New York Central system, the company's line was known as the Troy and Schenectady Branch. It continued as a through route until 1964, when it was abandoned between Aqueduct and Crescent. The line was little-used at that point, and the state of New York sought to eliminate an awkward grade crossing of the Adirondack Northway. Actual removal occurred in 1965. Both ends remained in use for local service. The west end between Schenectady and Aqueduct was conveyed to Conrail in 1976. The east end between Crescent and Green Island was not conveyed to Conrail; the Delaware and Hudson Railway operated it for a period under subsidy. Today, the right-of-way has been converted into the Mohawk-Hudson Bike-Hike Trail.
