= Shoreline Trail =

Paved path within Niagara and Erie County

The Shoreline Trail is a paved path in the U.S. state of New York. The path is within Niagara County and Erie County. It is used by walkers and cyclists, and dogs are allowed. The trail begins in Buffalo Harbor State Park and stretches north including a variety of cities and views of multiple bodies of water. Parking is provided in multiple spots along the path.

== Sections ==
=== West River section ===
The West River portion of the trail resides entirely in Grand Island and connects Buckhorn State Park to Big Six Marina to a preexisting trail in Beaver Island State Park. The trail has a seasonal restroom located at Big Six Marina and has four portable toilets located in various spots along the trail. Three paddle craft launches are located along the trail as well. Numerous duck blinds are along the trail.

=== Riverwalk section ===
The Riverwalk section of the Shoreline Trail stretches from North Tonawanda to Buffalo. This portion of the trail boasts water front views of the Erie Canal, Niagara River and Lake Erie. The trail connects several parks including Niawanda Park and Aqua Lane Park in the City of Tonawanda and Black Rock Canal Park, Towpath Park, Riverside Park, Front Park and Lasalle Park in Buffalo.

=== Industrial Heritage section ===
This section stretches through Buffalo along Lake Erie and allows trail visitors to view nature. Located along this section of trail is Times Beach Nature Preserve and Tifft Nature Preserve.

=== Sunset View section ===
This section of the Shoreline Trail consists of several phases including the Bethlehem phase, Woodlawn phase and the Hamburg section. The Bethlehem phase in Buffalo and the City of Lackawanna connects trail users further south along the water. The Shoreline Trail in this area allows residents to enjoy the area around the previous Bethlehem Steel site.The Woodlawn phase is proposed to connect the Bethlehem phase of the trail to Blasdell including Woodlawn Beach State Park. The final stretch of the sunset view section is the Hamburg Section which is proposed to include Hamburg Town Park.

=== Beaches section ===
The Beaches section of the Shoreline Trail is made up of several phases some of which were yet to be completed as of 2021, with the intent to connect multiple beaches throughout the Town of Evans and the Town of Brant. Phase 1 which was completed in 2014 consisted of 1.5 miles of an eight foot wide path. The first portion of the trail stretches from Wendt Beach County Park to Bennet Beach Park. Phase 2 is just under 1.5 miles long and begins in Bennet Beach Park and travels south to Evans Town Park. Phase 2 is under construction but yet to be completed. Phase 3 is separated into Phase 3A and Phase 3B. Phase 3A includes 1.3 miles from Roat Drive to Sturgeon Point Road. Phase 3A is under construction. Phase 3B is proposed to be approximately 4 miles long beginning where Phase 3A ends, Sturgeon Point Road north to Eighteen Mile Creek. Phase 4 is proposed to be made up of over a mile and half of path from Evans Town Park to Lake Erie Beach. Proposed Phase 5 is just over a mile long beginning in Lake Erie Beach and ending in Evangola State Park. Upon completion of all five phases the Shoreline Trail would stretch over 10 miles.

== Funding ==
A combination of government funding and grants that have been allocated to the Shoreline Trail project funded construction throughout the years. In September 2018, the Natural Heritage Trust administered $1.6 million to complete the Riverwalk Section of the trail. Erie County received $315,000 from the Greenway Fund Standing Committee in March 2021. Phase 1 of the Beaches Section was paid for with county, state and federal money. However, Phase 2 of the Beaches section of the trail was funded via only county and federal money.
