= New York State Canal System =

Canal system in New York

- Location: Upstate New York
- Country: United States

Specifications
- Length: 525 miles (845 km)
- Lock length: 328 ft (100 m)
- Lock width: 45 ft (14 m)
- Maximum boat draft: 12 ft (3.7 m)
- Status: Open
- Navigation authority: New York State Canal Corporation

Geography
- Branches: Erie Canal, Champlain Canal, Oswego Canal, Cayuga–Seneca Canal
- New York State Barge Canal
- U.S. National Register of Historic Places
- U.S. National Historic Landmark District
- Lock 30 at Macedon, 2006
- Location: 17 counties in upstate New York
- Area: 36.7 square miles (95 km^{2})
- Built: 1905–63
- Architect: New York State Engineer's and Surveyor's Office: Edward Bond Austin, Frank Martin Williams, David Alexander Watt, A.A. Conger, William R. Davis
- NRHP reference No.: 14000860

Significant dates
- Added to NRHP: October 15, 2014
- Designated NHLD: December 23, 2016

The New York State Canal System (formerly known as the New York State Barge Canal) is a successor to the Erie Canal and other canals within New York. The 525-mile (845 km) system is composed of the Erie Canal, the Oswego Canal, the Cayuga–Seneca Canal, and the Champlain Canal. In 2014 the entire system was listed as a national historic district on the National Register of Historic Places, and in 2016 it was designated a National Historic Landmark.

The Erie Canal connects the Hudson River to Lake Erie; the Cayuga–Seneca Canal connects Seneca Lake and Cayuga Lake to the Erie Canal; the Oswego Canal connects the Erie Canal to Lake Ontario; and the Champlain Canal connects the Hudson River to Lake Champlain.

== History ==
In 1903 New York State legislature authorized construction of the "New York State Barge Canal" as the "improvement of the Erie, the Oswego, the Champlain and the Cayuga and Seneca Canals". In 1905, construction of the Barge Canal began; it was completed in 1918, at a cost of $96.7 million. It opened to through traffic May 15, 1918. The Barge Canal's new route took advantage of rivers (such as the Mohawk River, Oswego River, Seneca River, Genesee River and Clyde River) that the original Erie Canal builders had avoided, thus bypassing some major cities formerly on the route, such as Syracuse and Rochester. However, particularly in western New York State, the canal system uses the same (enlarged) channel as the original Erie Canal. In 1924 the Barge Canal built the Gowanus Bay Terminal in Brooklyn to handle canal cargo.

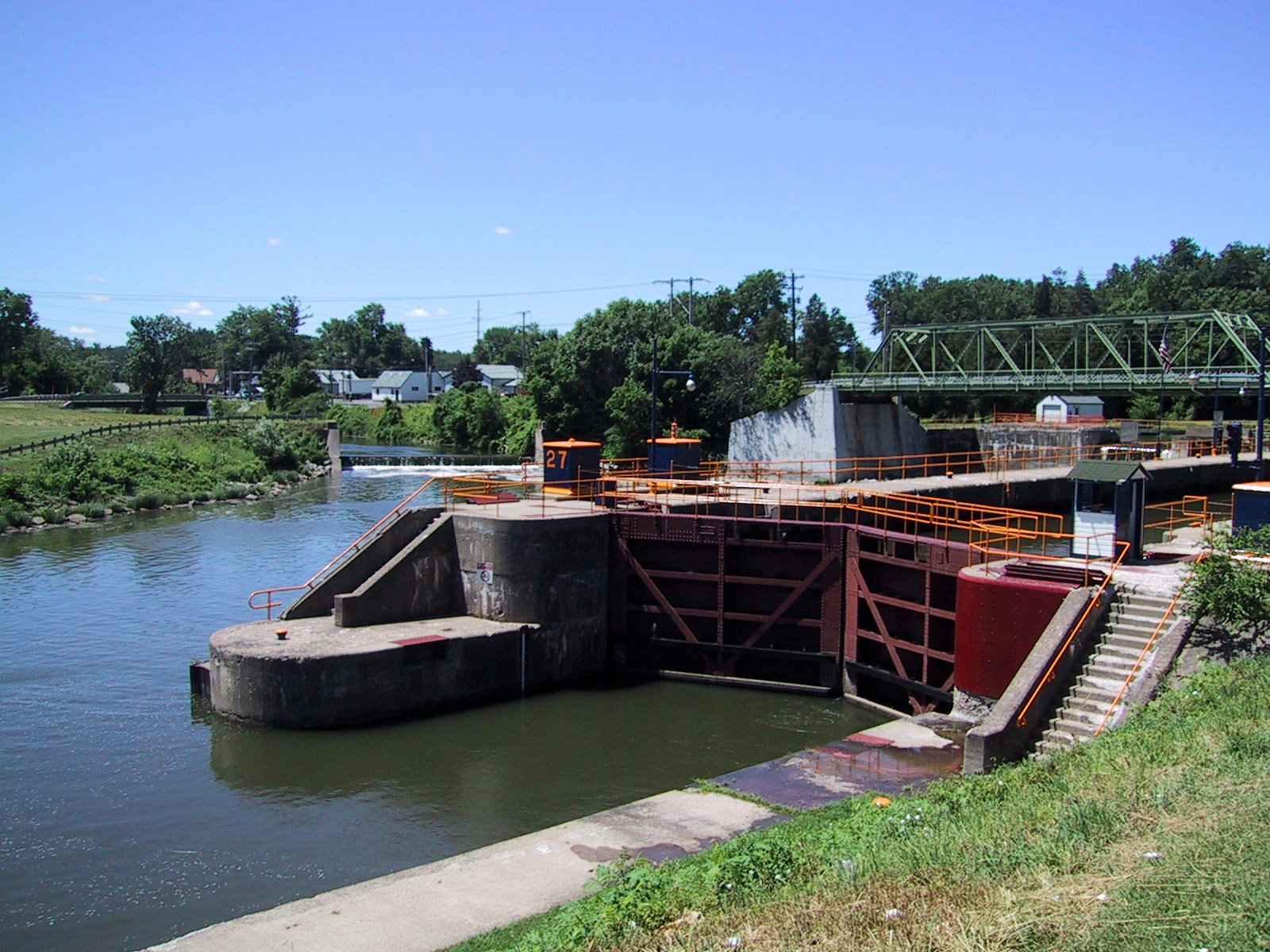
Lock 27 in Lyons, New York

Since the 1970s, the state has ceased modernizing the system due to the shift to truck transport. The canal is preserved primarily for historical and recreational purposes. Today, very few commercial vessels use the canal; it is mainly used by private pleasure boats, although it also serves as a method of controlling floods. The last regularly scheduled commercial ship operating on the canal was the Day Peckinpaugh, which ceased operation in 1994.

Since 1992, the Barge Canal is no longer known by that name. Individual canals in the New York State Canal System, formerly collectively known as "the Barge Canal," are now referred to by their original names (Erie Canal, Oswego Canal, Cayuga–Seneca Canal, and Champlain Canal). Today, the system's canals are 12 feet (3.7 m) deep and 120 feet (37 m) wide, with 57 electrically operated locks, and can accommodate vessels up to 2,000 tons (1,800 metric tons). The canal system is open for navigation generally from May 1 through November 15. Payment of a fee for a permit is required to traverse the locks and lift bridges with motorized craft.

In 2004, the New York State Canal Corporation reported a total of 122,034 recreational lockings on the canal, along with 8,514 tour boat lockings and 7,369 hire boat lockings, and a total of 12,182 tons of cargo valued at approximately $102 million was shipped on the canal system.

In 2012, the system's annual cargo volume reached 42,000 tons.

Travel on the Canal's middle section (particularly in the Mohawk River valley) was severely hampered during destructive flooding in Upstate New York in late June and early July 2006. Flood damage to the canal system and its facilities was estimated to be at least $15 million.

In 2011, newly elected Governor Andrew Cuomo appointed Schenectady Mayor Brian Stratton as director of the Canal Corporation, which runs the Canal System.

At the end of August 2011 Tropical Storm Irene caused closure of almost the entire canal due to flooding. At the beginning of September 2011, Tropical Storm Lee added more flooding to the system. Damage to several locks was severe enough to close the canal from Lock 8 (Scotia) through Lock 17 (Little Falls) from late August. The canal was fully open for the start of the 2012 navigation season.

Over 200,000 tons of cargo was expected for 2017, the largest shipping volume since 1993.

== Funding and maintenance ==
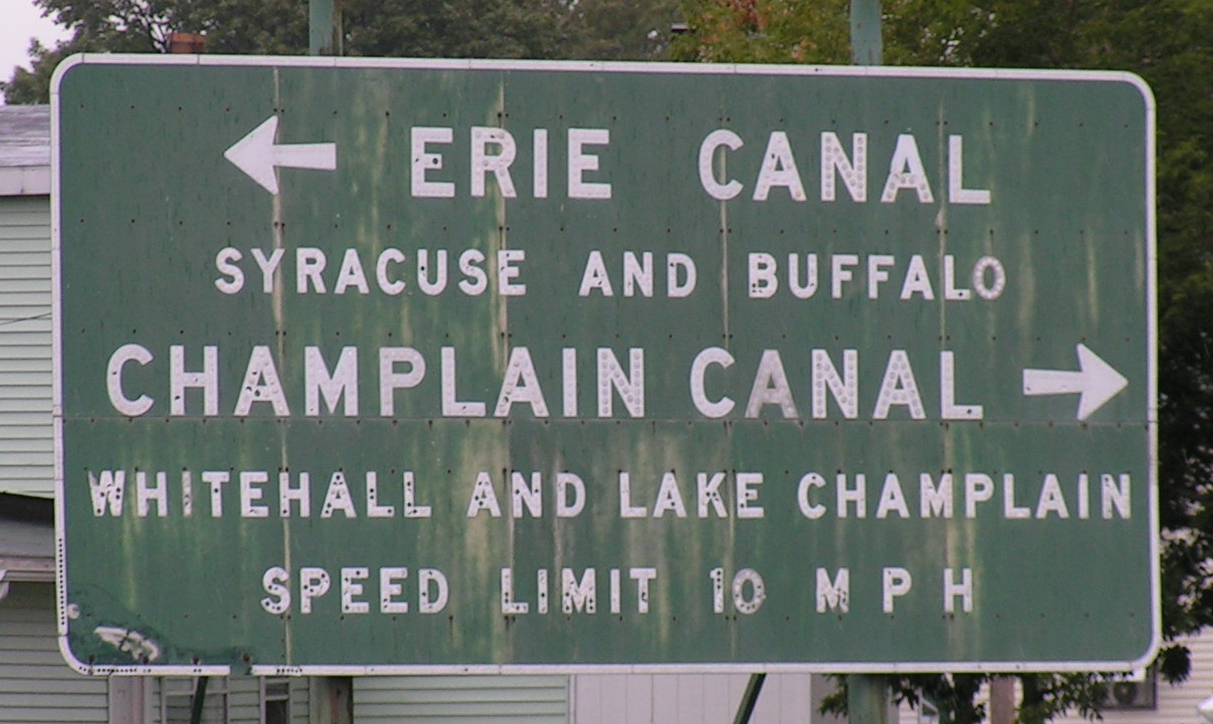
Sign in Waterford marking the split of the Erie and Champlain Canals

The New York State Canal Corporation is responsible for the oversight, administration and maintenance of the New York State Canal System. In 2012, the Canal Corp., then a subsidiary of the New York State Thruway Authority, employed 529 people, consisting of 458 full-time employees and 78 seasonal workers. Its spending accounted for about 10 percent of the Thruway Authority's total $1.1 billion in annual spending. In 2012, the Canal Corp.'s operating budget was $55.7 million and its capital budget was $51.4 million.

An August 2012 report by state Comptroller Thomas DiNapoli said the canal system "contributed to the deterioration of the Authority's financial condition over the past decade", with canal traffic dropping nearly one-third since the period immediately before the Thruway Authority assumed control.

Effective January 1, 2017, the New York State Canal Corporation became a subsidiary of the New York Power Authority. The move was authorized in April 2016 through the state budget process. Its headquarters then moved from the Thruway Authority's offices to 30 S. Pearl Street, Albany, the New York Power Authority's regional offices.

== See also ==
- List of canals in New York
- List of National Historic Landmarks in New York
- List of navigation authorities in the United States
- National Register of Historic Places in New York
