= Champlain Canal =

Canal in New York, US

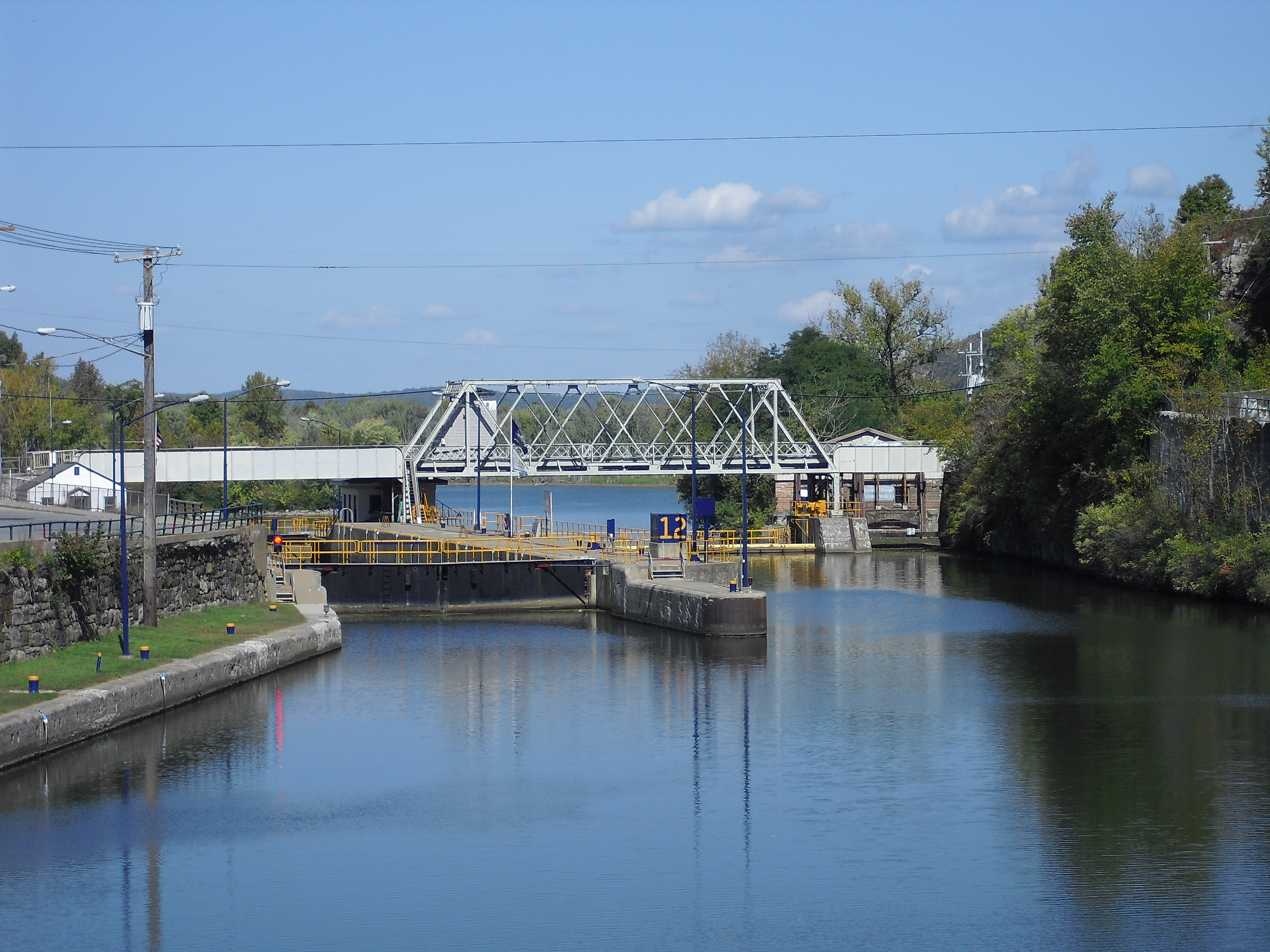
- Lock C-12 in Whitehall, New York
- Modern route of the Champlain Canal
- Location: New York State
- Country: United States
- Coordinates: 43°26′31″N 73°26′48″W

Specifications
- Lock length: 328 feet (100 m)
- Lock width: 45 ft (14 m)
- Maximum boat length: 300 feet (91 m)
- Maximum boat beam: 43.5 feet (13.3 m)
- Maximum boat draft: 12 feet (3.7 m)
- Locks: 11
- Status: Open (seasonal)

History
- Date approved: 1817
- Date completed: September 10, 1823

Geography
- Start point: Hudson River
- End point: Lake Champlain
- Branch of: New York State Canal System
- Connects to: Erie Canal

- Champlain Canal
- U.S. National Register of Historic Places
- U.S. Historic district
- Location: Rensselaer, Saratoga, and Washington counties, New York, US; extends from Waterford through Fort Edward to Whitehall
- Built: 1823
- Architect: Wright, Benjamin; Jarvis, John B.
- Architectural style: Transportation Canal
- NRHP reference No.: 76001274
- Added to NRHP: September 1, 1976

The Champlain Canal is a 60-mile (97 km) canal in New York that connects the Hudson River to the south end of Lake Champlain. It was simultaneously constructed with the Erie Canal for use by commercial vessels, fully opening in 1823. Today, it is mostly used by recreational boaters as part of the New York State Canal System and Lakes to Locks Passage.

Water for the highest portion comes from the Hudson River via the Glens Falls Feeder Canal, from above the drop at Glens Falls, New York.

== History ==
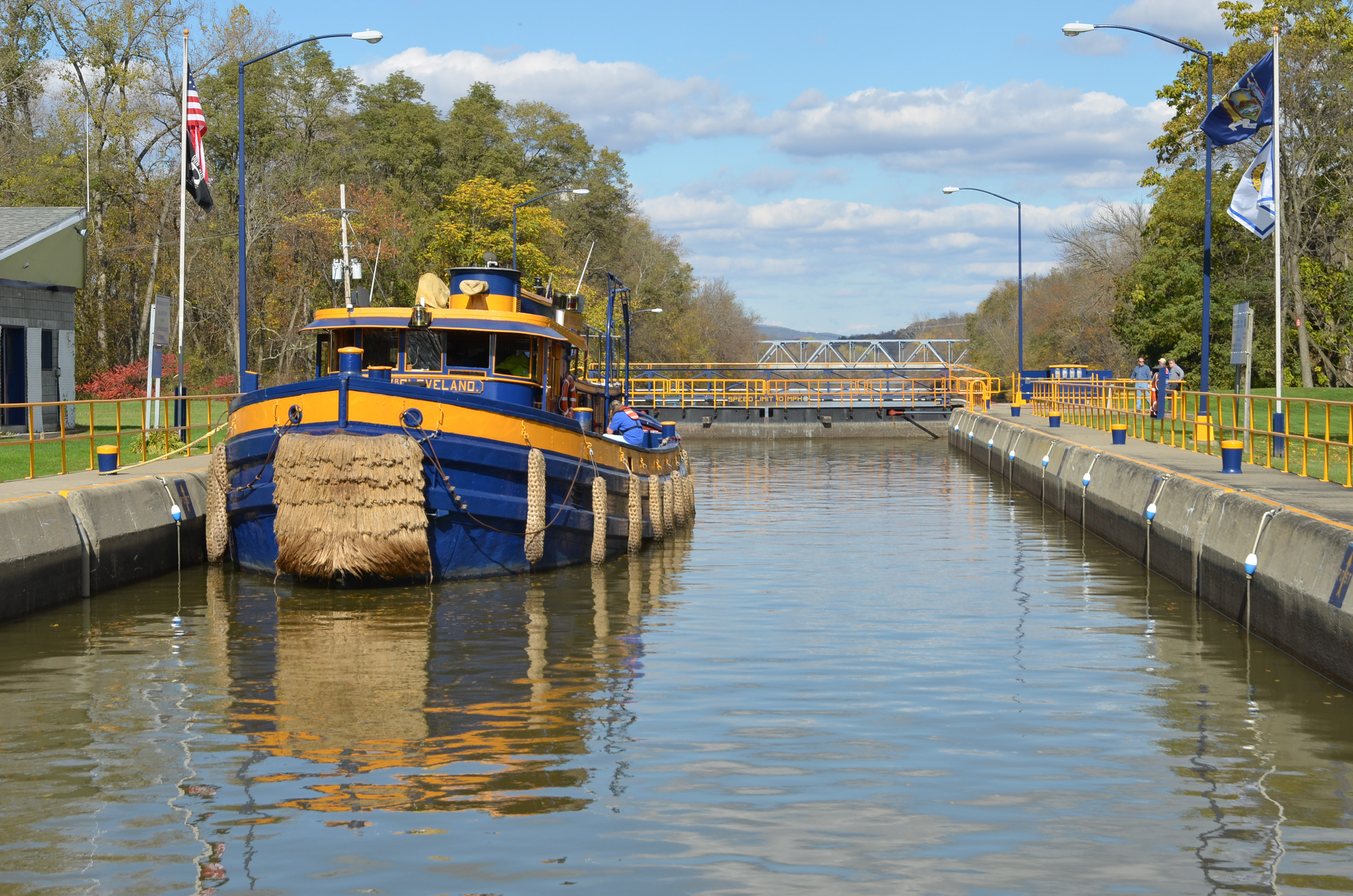
Lock C9 in Smith's Basin.

An early proposal made in the 1790s by Marc Isambard Brunel for a Hudson River–Lake Champlain canal was not approved. Another proposal for the canal was made in 1812 and construction authorized in 1817. By 1818, 12 miles (19 km) were completed, and in 1819 the canal was opened from Fort Edward to Lake Champlain. The canal was officially opened on September 10, 1823. It was an immediate financial success, and carried substantial commercial traffic until the 1970s.

In 1903, New York authorized the expansion of the Champlain Canal—along with the Erie, Oswego, and Cayuga–Seneca Canals—into the "New York State Barge Canal." The project broke ground in 1905 and was completed in 1918. The "Barge Canal" name fell out of use in 1992.

The abandoned Lake Champlain Seaway proposal would have upgraded the Champlain Canal into a ship canal, easing marine transport between New York City and Montreal.

Perspective map of Mechanicville from the late 19th century by L.R. Burleigh showing the Champlain Canal and Hudson River

== Route ==
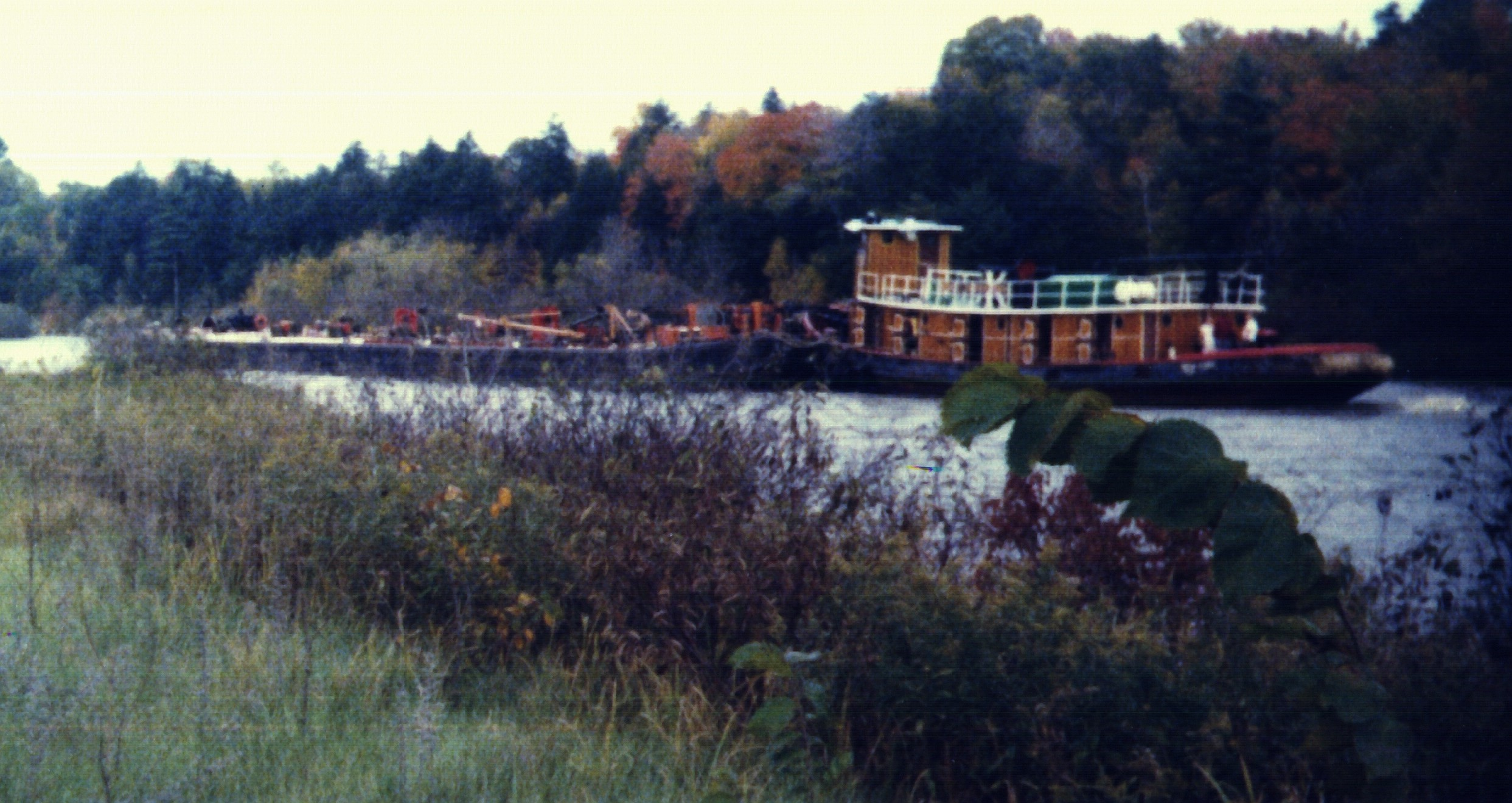
Tug and barge on the Champlain Canal during the 1980s

The Champlain Canal's southern end is about 3 miles (4.8 km) north of the locks at the Troy Federal Dam, at the point where the Erie Canal splits from the Hudson River. The Hudson River is designated as part of the canal proceeding north for approximately 35 miles (56 km), with six locks providing navigation around dams, until it reaches lock C-7 in Fort Edward, New York. At this point, the canal diverges from the river and follows a constructed channel for approximately 25 miles (40 km), with five additional locks, bringing the canal to the southern end of Lake Champlain at Whitehall, New York.

The elevation on the Hudson River portion increases from 15 feet (4.6 m) above sea level at the southern end, on the northern end of the locks at the Troy Federal Dam, to about 130 feet (40 m) above sea level at lock C-7, where the canal leaves the Hudson River. The elevation of the constructed portion reaches a peak of 140 feet (43 m) above sea level between locks C-9 and C-11, then declines to the level of Lake Champlain, between 94 and 100 feet (29 and 30 m) above sea level, at Whitehall. By traveling the length of Lake Champlain, boaters can access the Richelieu River and Chambly Canal, which connect Lake Champlain to the Saint Lawrence River.

== Locks ==
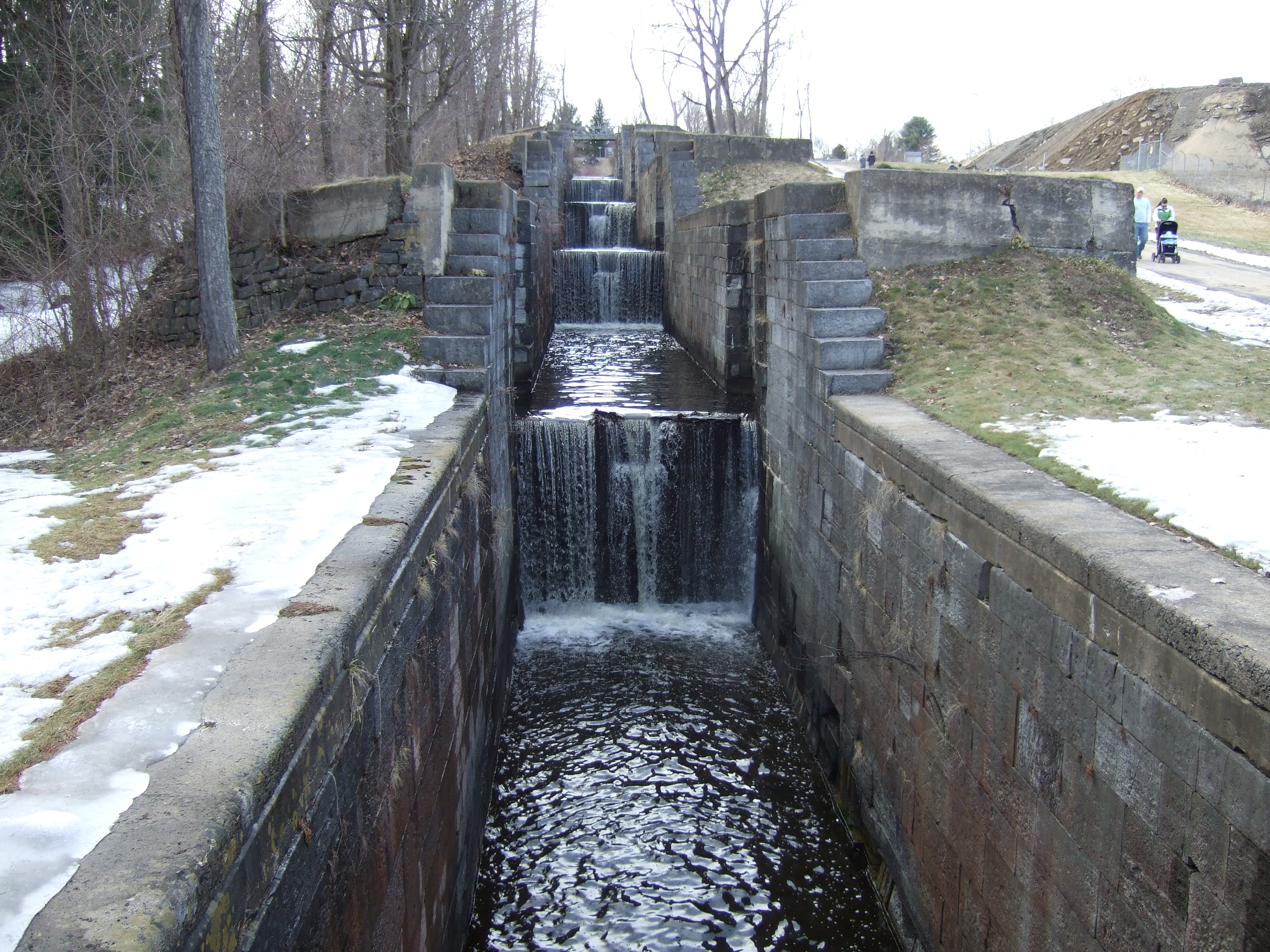
Second-generation water supply locks known as "The Combines". They supply water from the Hudson River to the Champlain Canal via the Glens Falls Feeder Canal running from Glens Falls to Fort Edward. They were formerly also utilized as secondary locks to navigate from Glen's Falls to the Champlain Canal.

The following list of locks is provided for the current canal, from south to north. There are a total of 11 locks on the Champlain Canal.

All locks on the New York State Canal System are single-chamber; the dimensions are 328 feet (100 m) long and 45 feet (14 m) wide with a minimum 12-foot (3.7 m) depth of water over the miter sills at the upstream gates upon lift. They can accommodate a vessel up to 300 feet (91 m) long and 43.5 feet (13.3 m) wide. Overall sidewall height will vary by lock, ranging between 28 and 61 feet (8.5 and 18.6 m) depending on the lift and navigable stages.

There is no Lock C10 on the Champlain Canal. The Troy Federal Lock, located just north of Troy, New York, is not part of the New York State Canal System proper; it is operated by the United States Army Corps of Engineers. The Champlain Canal officially begins at the confluence of the Hudson and Mohawk rivers at Waterford, New York.

Distance is based on position markers from an interactive canal map provided online by the New York State Canal Corporation and may not exactly match specifications on signs posted along the canal. Mean surface elevations are comprised from a combination of older canal profiles and history books as well as specifications on signs posted along the canal. The margin of error should normally be within 6 inches (15 cm).

| Lock No. | Location | Elevation (upstream/north) | Elevation (downstream/south) | Lift or Drop | Distance to Next Lock (upstream/north) | HAER No. |
|---|---|---|---|---|---|---|
| Troy Federal Lock * | Troy | 15.3 ft (4.7 m) | 1.3 ft (0.40 m) | 14.0 ft (4.3 m) | C1, 5.41 mi (8.71 km) | |
| C1 | Waterford | 29.6 ft (9.0 m) | 15.3 ft (4.7 m) | 14.3 ft (4.4 m) | C2, 3.94 mi (6.34 km) | NY-348 |
| C2 | Halfmoon | 48.1 ft (14.7 m) | 29.6 ft (9.0 m) | 18.5 ft (5.6 m) | C3, 2.55 mi (4.10 km) | NY-349 |
| C3 | Mechanicville | 67.6 ft (20.6 m) | 48.1 ft (14.7 m) | 19.5 ft (5.9 m) | C4, 1.84 mi (2.96 km) | NY-351 |
| C4 | Stillwater | 83.6 ft (25.5 m) | 67.6 ft (20.6 m) | 16.0 ft (4.9 m) | C5, 14.41 mi (23.19 km) | NY-352 |
| C5 | Northumberland | 102.6 ft (31.3 m) | 83.6 ft (25.5 m) | 19.0 ft (5.8 m) | C6, 3.73 mi (6.00 km) | NY-354 |
| C6 | Fort Miller | 119.1 ft (36.3 m) | 102.6 ft (31.3 m) | 16.5 ft (5.0 m) | C7, 7.13 mi (11.47 km) | NY-356 |
| C7 | Fort Edward | 129.1 ft (39.3 m) | 119.1 ft (36.3 m) | 10.0 ft (3.0 m) | C8, 2.18 mi (3.51 km) | NY-358 |
| C8 | Fort Edward | 140.1 ft (42.7 m) | 129.1 ft (39.3 m) | 11.0 ft (3.4 m) | C9, 5.83 mi (9.38 km) | NY-362 |
| C9 | Smiths Basin | 124.1 ft (37.8 m) | 140.1 ft (42.7 m) | −16.0 ft (−4.9 m) | C11, 9.24 mi (14.87 km) | NY-364 |
| C11 | Comstock | 112.1 ft (34.2 m) | 124.1 ft (37.8 m) | −12.0 ft (−3.7 m) | C12, 6.44 mi (10.36 km) | NY-365 |
| C12 | Whitehall | 96.6 ft (29.4 m) | 112.1 ft (34.2 m) | −15.5 ft (−4.7 m) | Lake Champlain | NY-367 |

All surface elevations are approximate.

* Denotes Federal managed locks.

Lake Champlain has a mean surface elevation ranging between 95 and 100 feet (29 and 30 m).
