= Cayuga–Seneca Canal =

Waterway in New York, U.S.

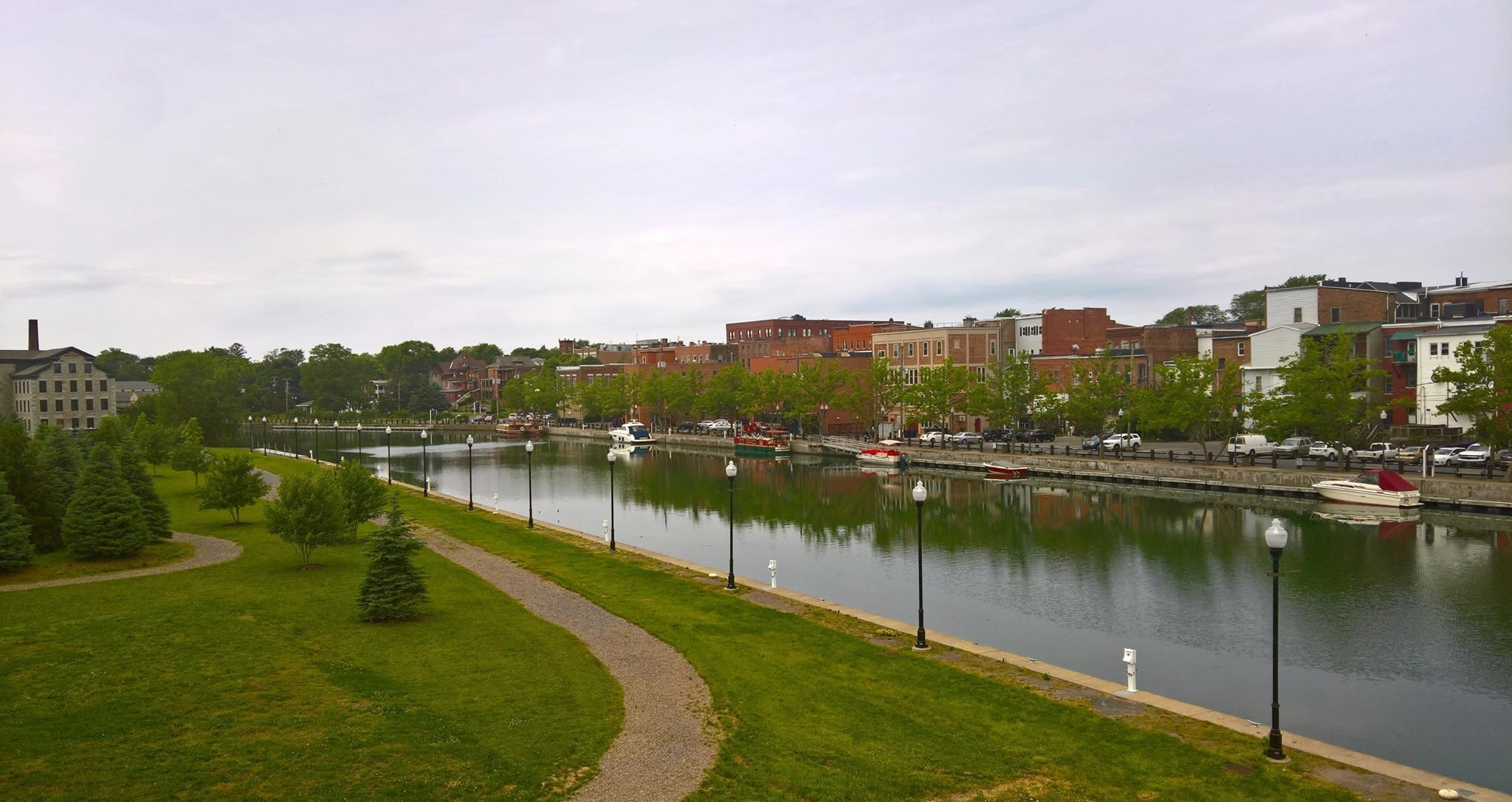
- The Cayuga–Seneca Canal at Seneca Falls

Specifications
- Length: 20 miles (32 km)
- Maximum boat length: 300 feet (91 m)
- Maximum boat beam: 43.5 feet (13.3 m)
- Locks: 4
- Total rise: 71 feet (22 m)
- Status: Open
- Navigation authority: New York State Canal Corporation

History
- Date completed: 1818

Geography
- Start point: Geneva, New York, on Seneca Lake (43.4757°N 76.5161°W)
- End point: confluence of Seneca River and the Erie Canal (43.004393°N 76.729072°W)
- Branch of: New York State Canal System
- Connects to: Erie Canal

The Cayuga–Seneca Canal is a canal in New York, United States. It is now part of the New York State Canal System. The canal connects the Erie Canal to Cayuga Lake and Seneca Lake and is approximately 20 miles (32 km) long. A multi-use trail runs beside a portion of the canal.

== History ==
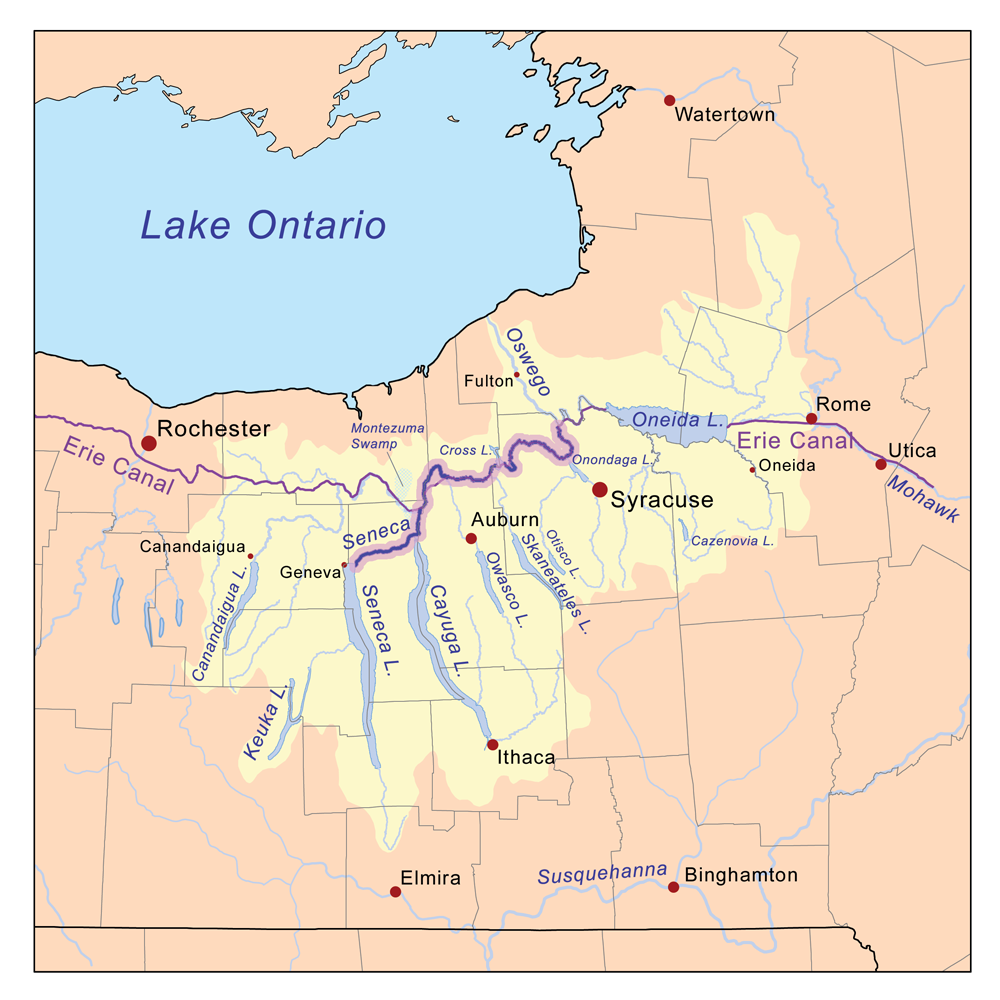
The Seneca River

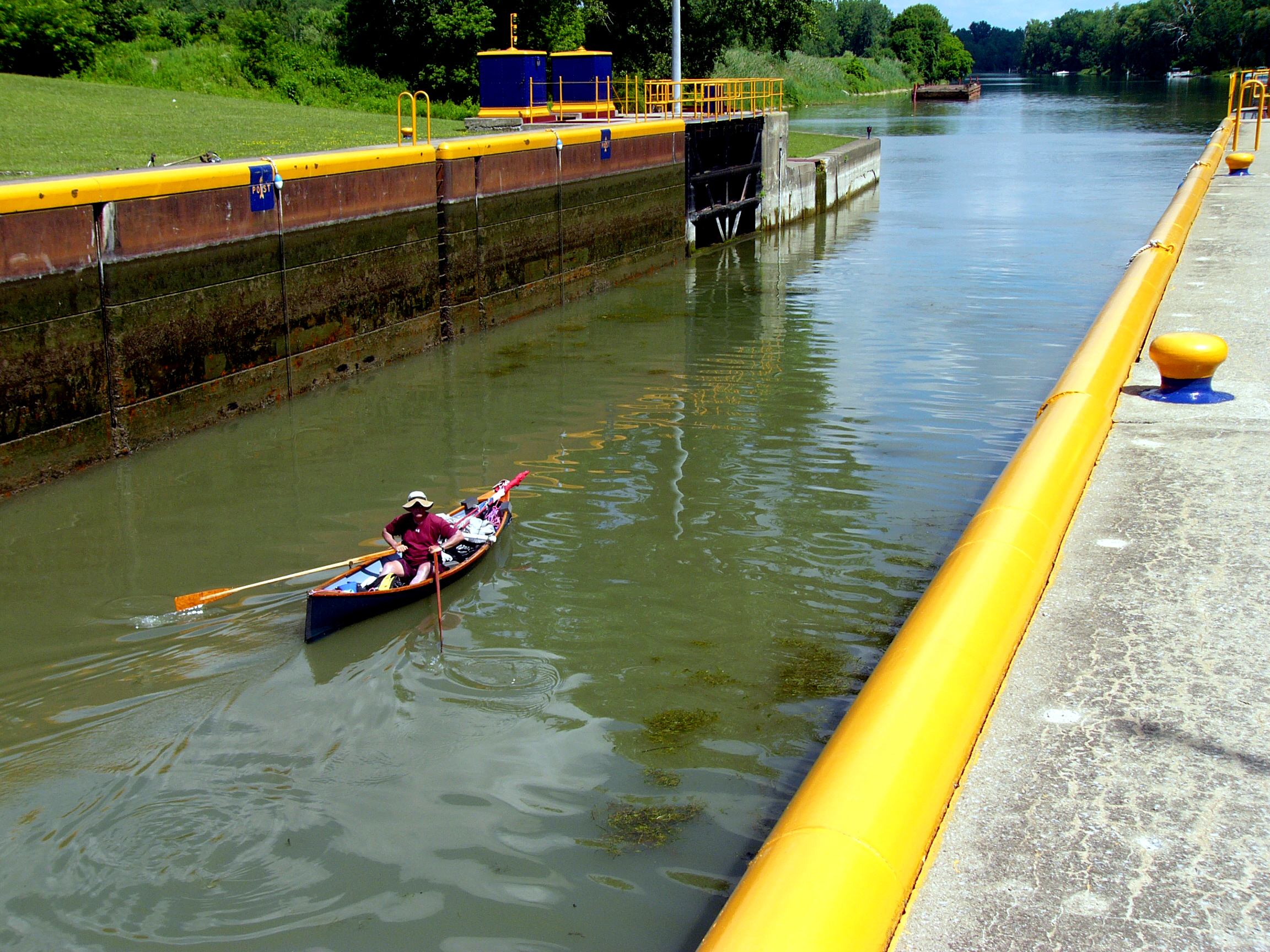
Lock on the Cayuga-Seneca Canal

The Seneca River, now the Cayuga–Seneca Canal, always has been an economic engine for the communities of Waterloo and Seneca Falls. The Seneca Lock Navigation Co., a private enterprise formed in 1813, dammed three sets of rapids and installed locks to allow goods to be transported to the Erie Canal. In 1818, a canal was opened between Cayuga and Seneca Lakes. By 1823, an average of eight boats a day were passing through the lock at Waterloo, carrying flour, potash, pork, whiskey, lumber and wool and returning with other products and merchandise. Job Smith, Seneca Falls’ first businessman, opened a portage company on the eastern end of the river in 1787. The company transported travelers, boats and goods around a mile-long series of rapids with a 42-foot (13 m) drop known as “the Falls.”

The locks at Seneca Falls were completed in 1818. Improvements between the lakes, completed in 1821, made eight stone locks and nearly two miles of dug canal in addition to sections of the river. To further develop industry, the rapids were dammed to form the Upper, Middle and Lower Falls, and rapid industrialization began in 1825. Through Seneca Falls, there was a lock for every important mill site, raising or lowering the boats a total of 42 feet (13 m).

In 1825, a canal was begun to connect Seneca Lake with the newly constructed Erie Canal at Montezuma and the Cayuga–Seneca Canal was put into use in 1828. The Canal was enlarged in 1862, and the Flats, an area adjacent to and east of the village center, grew into a major industrial area, producing fire engines, hose carts and other firefighting equipment, pumps and other iron goods including stove parts, bootjacks, corn shellers, meat choppers, sausage stuffers, flatirons and bells. A knitting mill made socks and once produced 85,000 pairs of socks for the Army and Navy.

C-S Canal locks were modified in 1918 when New York State created the New York Barge Canal System. State engineers replaced five locks with a large two-flight lock - a 49-foot (15 m) lift that required a great pool of water for their operation. This spelled the demise of the Flats. Buildings were destroyed or moved to create Van Cleef Lake. Flooding was completed on August 20, 1915.

== Locks ==
The following list of locks is provided for the current canal, from east to west. There are a total of 4 locks on the Cayuga–Seneca Canal.

All locks on the New York State Canal System are single-chamber; the dimensions are 328 feet (100 m) long and 45 feet (14 m) wide with a minimum 12-foot (3.7 m) depth of water over the miter sills at the upstream gates upon lift. They can accommodate a vessel up to 300 feet (91 m) long and 43.5 feet (13.3 m) wide. Overall sidewall height will vary by lock, ranging between 28 and 61 feet (8.5 and 18.6 m) depending on the lift and navigable stages.

Distance is based on position markers from an interactive canal map provided online by the New York State Canal Corporation and may not exactly match specifications on signs posted along the canal. Mean surface elevations are comprised from a combination of older canal profiles and history books as well as specifications on signs posted along the canal. The margin of error should normally be within 6 inches (15 cm).

Lock No.	Location	Elevation (upstream/west)	Elevation (downstream/east)	Lift or Drop	Distance to Next Lock (upstream/west)	HAER No.
CS1	Cayuga	381.5 ft (116.3 m)	374.0 ft (114.0 m)	7.5 ft (2.3 m)	CS2, 3.97 mi (6.39 km)	NY-521
CS2	Seneca Falls	406.0 ft (123.7 m)	381.5 ft (116.3 m)	24.5 ft (7.5 m)	CS3, adjacent to Lock CS2	NY-522
CS3	Seneca Falls	430.5 ft (131.2 m)	406.0 ft (123.7 m)	24.5 ft (7.5 m)	CS4, 4.30 mi (6.92 km)	NY-522
CS4	Waterloo	445.0 ft (135.6 m)	430.5 ft (131.2 m)	14.5 ft (4.4 m)	Seneca Lake, 4.96 mi (7.98 km)	NY-524

All surface elevations are approximate.

The Cayuga–Seneca Canal officially begins at the confluence of the Seneca and Clyde rivers near Mays Point. The connection to Cayuga Lake is just east of Lock CS1, where the mean surface elevation is 382 feet (116 m). From there, the canal makes a sharp turn westward and continues towards Seneca Lake, where the mean elevation at the western terminus is 445 feet (136 m).

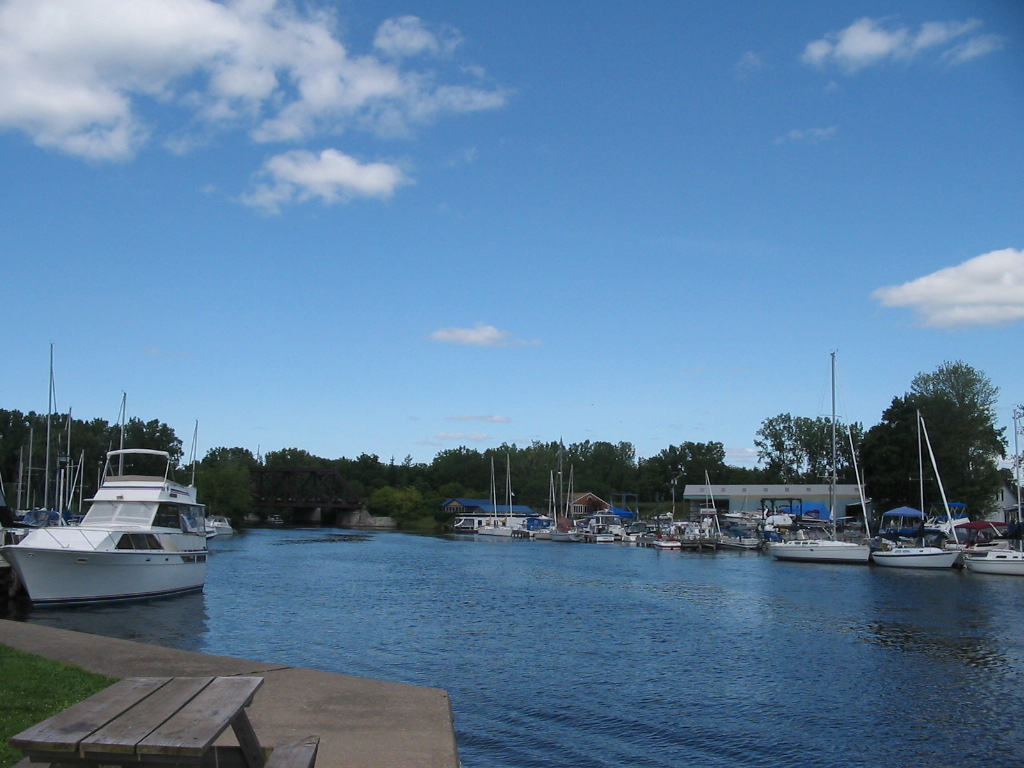
Cayuga – Seneca Canal from Seneca Lake State Park, Geneva, New York.

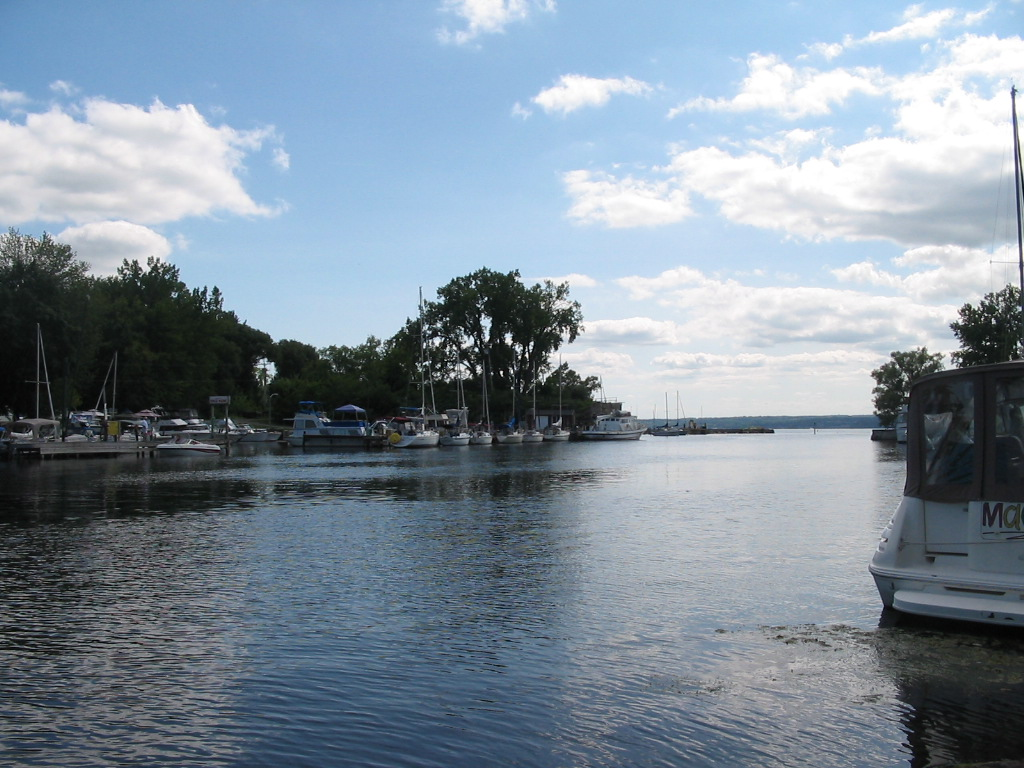
Cayuga – Seneca Canal at the Northern tip of Seneca Lake.

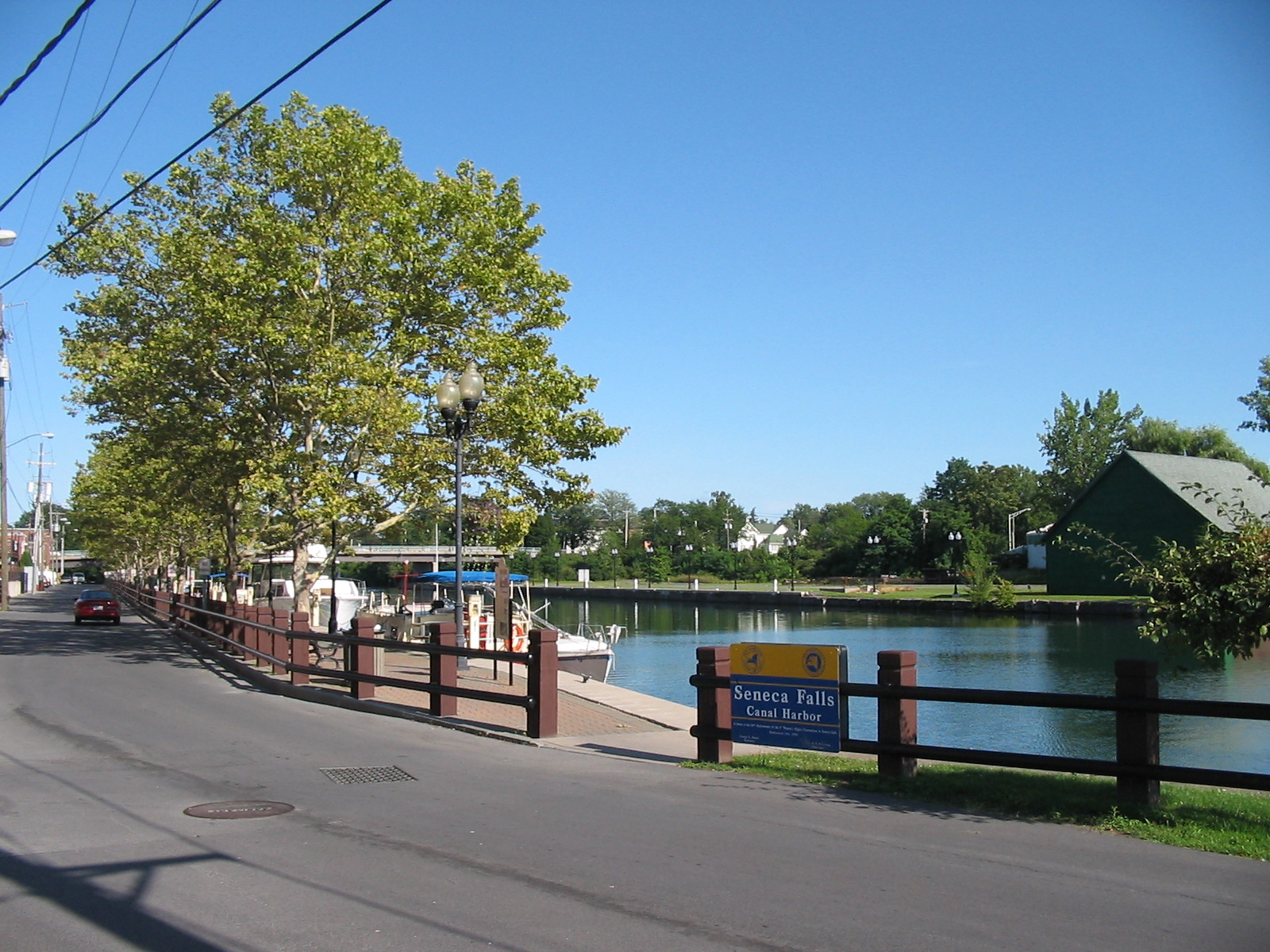
Cayuga – Seneca Canal from Seneca Falls, New York.

== Trail ==
The Cayuga-Seneca Canal Trail is a multi-use recreational trail running beside the canal on an old railroad bed. The trail connects to the lakefront at Seneca Lake State Park as well as Bishop Nature Preserve and runs to the Village of Waterloo. The trail will ultimately connect to the Montezuma National Wildlife Refuge.

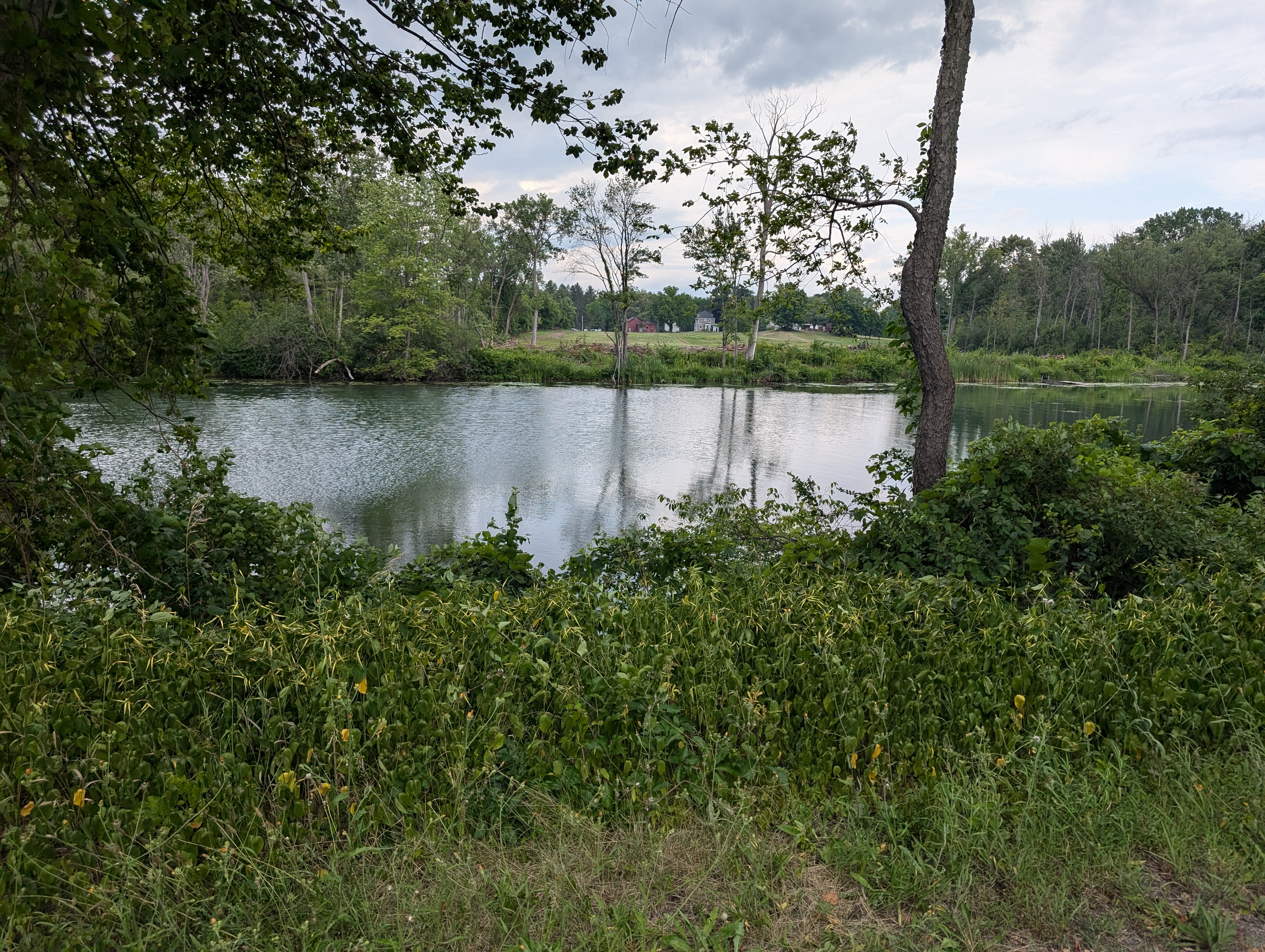
View from the Cayuga-Seneca Canal Trail.

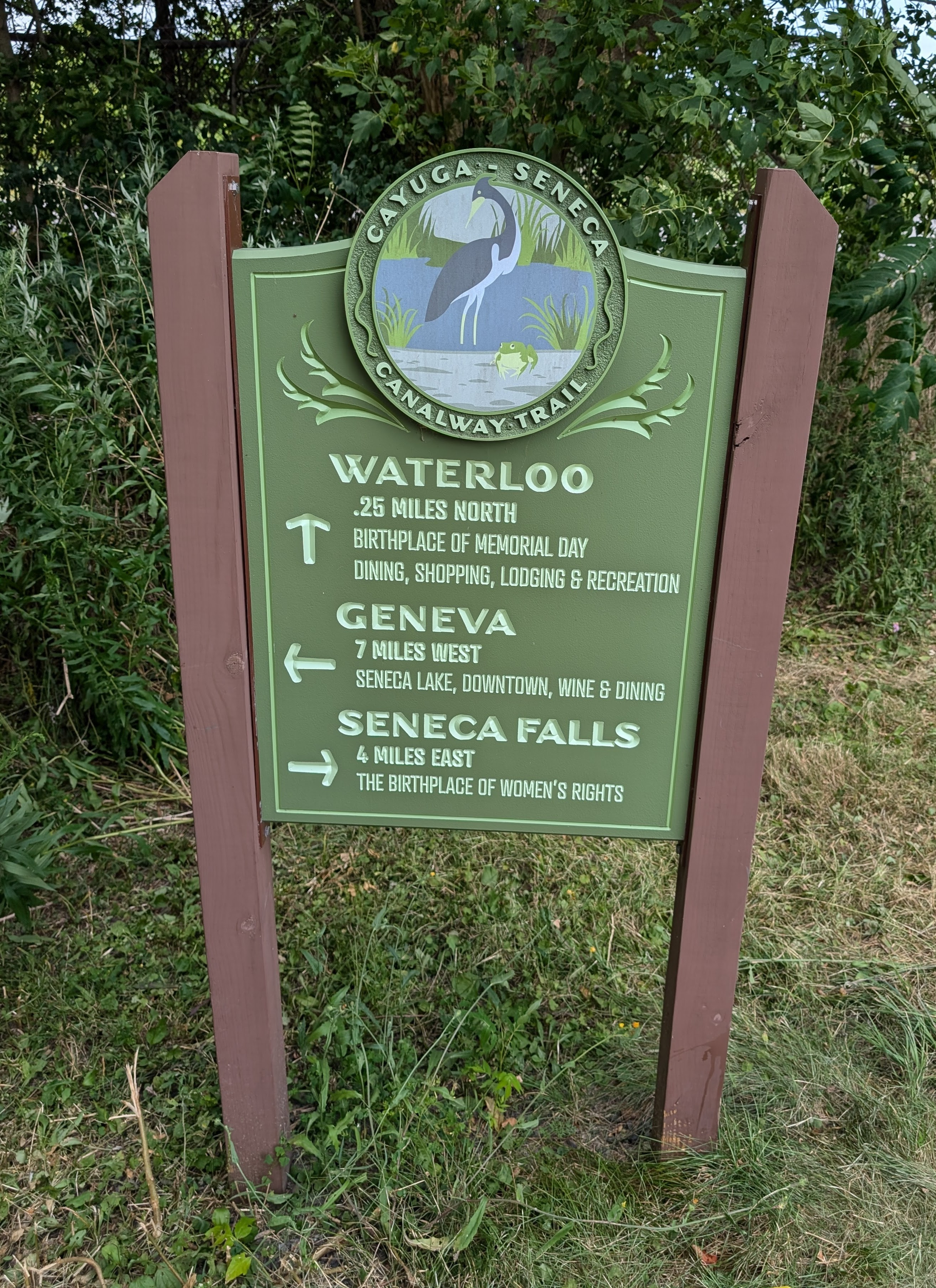
Cayuga-Seneca Canal Trail sign.

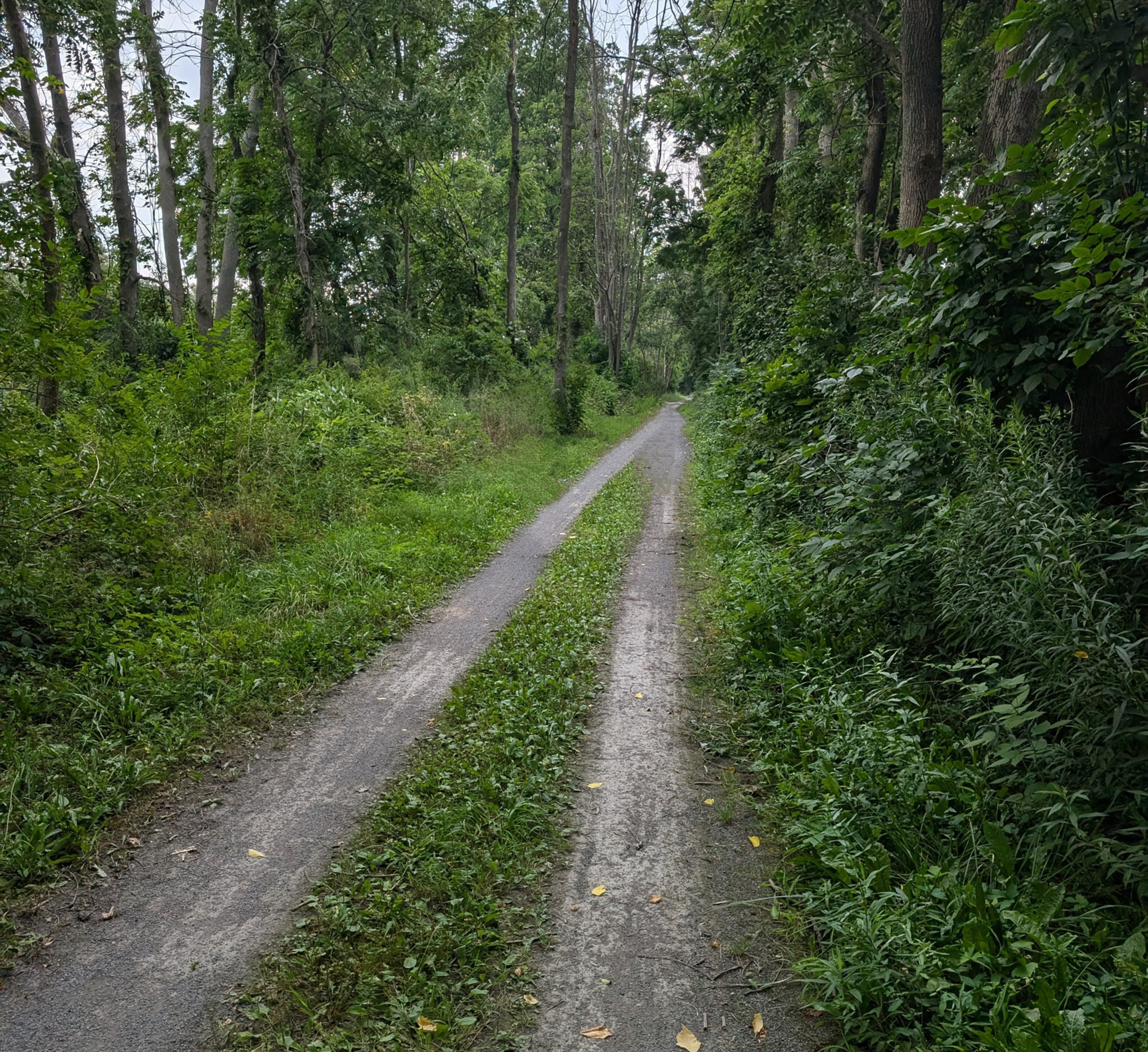
View of the Cayuga-Seneca Canal Trail.
