= Oswego Canal =

Waterway in New York, U.S.

Specifications
- Length: 23.7 miles (38.1 km)
- Maximum boat length: 300 ft 0 in (91.44 m)
- Maximum boat beam: 43 ft 6 in (13.3 m)
- Locks: 7
- Maximum height AMSL: 363 ft (111 m)
- Status: open
- Navigation authority: New York State Canal Corporation

History
- Date completed: 1828

Geography
- Start point: Oswego, New York, on Lake Ontario (43.4757°N 76.5161°W)
- End point: confluence of Seneca and Oneida River (43.2014°N 76.2804°W)
- Branch of: New York State Canal System
- Connects to: Erie Canal

The Oswego Canal is a canal in the New York State Canal System located in New York, United States. Opened in 1828, it is 23.7 miles (38.1 km) in length, and connects the Erie Canal at Three Rivers (near Liverpool) to Lake Ontario at Oswego. The canal has a depth of 14 ft (4.3 m), with seven locks spanning the 118 ft (36 m) change in elevation.

The modern canal essentially follows the route of the Oswego River, canalized with locks & dams. Three locks, with a total lift of 45.6 feet (13.9 m) take boats over what had been a steep set of rapids at the city of Oswego. This is the only route from the Atlantic/Hudson River system to Lake Ontario fully within the United States.

== Volume of shipping ==
In 2013 National Public Radio station WRVO reported that the volume of shipping had been increasing, for several years, averaging about 80-120 vessels, per year. It attributed the increase to change in neighboring Canada's protection for shipping grain grown in Canada.

== Locks ==
The following list of locks is provided for the current canal, from south to north. There are a total of 7 locks on the Oswego Canal.

All locks on the New York State Canal System are single-chamber; the dimensions are 328 feet (100 m) long and 45 feet (14 m) wide with a minimum 12-foot (3.7 m) depth of water over the miter sills at the upstream gates upon lift. They can accommodate a vessel up to 300 feet (91 m) long and 43.5 feet (13.3 m) wide. Overall sidewall height will vary by lock, ranging between 28 and 61 feet (8.5 and 18.6 m) depending on the lift and navigable stages.

Note: There is no Lock O4 on the Oswego Canal. The Oswego Canal officially begins at the "Three Rivers" confluence of the Oneida, Seneca and Oswego rivers near Phoenix, New York. Lock O8 in Oswego was originally installed as a "siphon lock", which required air valves to push water in and out of the lock. It initially had issues holding a vacuum in the tank until a pump was added in 1943. The lock was converted to electrical culvert valves consistent with others on the New York State Canal System in 1968.

Distance is based on position markers from an interactive canal map provided online by the New York State Canal Corporation and may not exactly match specifications on signs posted along the canal. Mean surface elevations are comprised from a combination of older canal profiles and history books as well as specifications on signs posted along the canal. The margin of error should normally be within 6 inches (15 cm).

Lock No.	Location	Elevation (downstream/north)	Elevation (upstream/south)	Lift or Drop	Distance to Next Lock (downstream/north)	HAER No.
O1	Phoenix	352.8 ft (107.5 m)	363.0 ft (110.6 m)	−10.2 ft (−3.1 m)	O2, 9.33 mi (15.02 km)	NY-529
O2	Fulton	335.0 ft (102.1 m)	352.8 ft (107.5 m)	−17.8 ft (−5.4 m)	O3, 0.58 mi (0.93 km)	NY-530
O3	Fulton	308.0 ft (93.9 m)	335.0 ft (102.1 m)	−27.0 ft (−8.2 m)	O5, 6.43 mi (10.35 km)	NY-532
O5	Minetto	290.0 ft (88.4 m)	308.0 ft (93.9 m)	−18.0 ft (−5.5 m)	O6, 3.29 mi (5.29 km)	NY-534
O6	Oswego	270.0 ft (82.3 m)	290.0 ft (88.4 m)	−20.0 ft (−6.1 m)	O7, 0.67 mi (1.08 km)	NY-535
O7	Oswego	255.5 ft (77.9 m)	270.0 ft (82.3 m)	−14.5 ft (−4.4 m)	O8, 0.44 mi (0.71 km)	NY-536
O8	Oswego	244.4 ft (74.5 m)	255.5 ft (77.9 m)	−11.1 ft (−3.4 m)	Lake Ontario, 0.68 mi (1.09 km)	NY-538

All surface elevations are approximate.

Note: The mean surface elevation of Lake Ontario is 243 feet (74 m).
