= Hudson River Valley Greenway =

The Hudson River Valley Greenway is a system of parks, trails, and kayak/canoe routes along New York's Hudson River. It is also the name of New York State government organization that promotes and preserves these resources. The Greenway system includes the Hudson Valley Rail Trail. Fourteen counties are in the Greenway area. Dutchess County, Putnam County, and Westchester County are in the Hudson River Valley Greenway Compact Area.
