= Low Bridge (song) =

Folk song about the Erie Canal by Thomas S. Allen

"Low Bridge, Everybody Down"
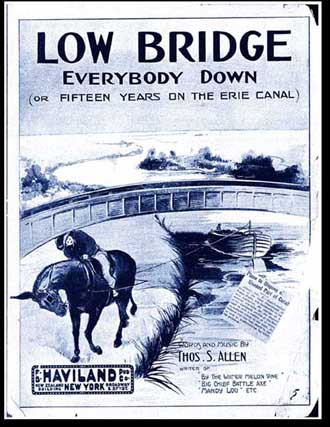
- The original publication of "Low Bridge, Everybody Down"
- Also known as: "Fifteen Years on the Erie Canal"; "Fifteen Miles on the Erie Canal"; "Erie Canal Song"; "Mule Named Sal"
- Lyrics: Thomas S. Allen, 1913
- Music: Thomas S. Allen, 1913

Audio sample
- "Low Bridge! Everybody Down" (Original piano accompaniment for the song by Thomas S. Allen. From the 1913 sheet music. Performed by Steven M. Alper.): file; help

"Low Bridge, Everybody Down" is a folk song credited to Thomas S. Allen (although its origin and authorship remain in question), first recorded in 1912, and published by F.B. Haviland Publishing Company in 1913. It was written after the construction of the New York State Barge Canal, which would replace the Erie Canal, was well underway, furthering the change from mule power to engine power, raising the speed of traffic.

Also known as "Fifteen Years on the Erie Canal", "Fifteen Miles on the Erie Canal", "Erie Canal Song", "Erie Barge Canal", and "Mule Named Sal", the song memorializes the years from 1825 to 1880 when the mule barges made boomtowns out of Utica, Rome, Syracuse, Rochester, and Buffalo, and transformed New York into the Empire State.

The music cover published in 1913 depicts a boy on a mule getting down to pass under a bridge, but the reference to "low bridge" in the song refers to travelers who would typically ride on top of the boats. The low bridges required them to get down out of the way to allow safe passage under a bridge.

== Recordings ==
Early 20th-century recordings of the song include ones by Billy Murray, Vernon Dalhart, and Jack Nerz. The song has become part of the folk repertoire, recorded by folksingers like Glenn Yarborough, Pete Seeger and the Weavers, The Kingston Trio, the children's series VeggieTales, and artists like the Sons of the Pioneers.

Dan Zanes included it on a children's album with Suzanne Vega singing lead. Bruce Springsteen recorded the song on his 2006 album We Shall Overcome: The Seeger Sessions. The cartoon series Animanics parodied "Low Bridge" with their song about the Panama Canal. A reggae version was performed by the Flexitoon Puppets on an episode of Shining Time Station. The lyrics are also the text of the book The Erie Canal (1970), illustrated by Peter Spier.

== Lyrics ==
These are the lyrics as they were originally published by Thomas Allen in 1913:

I've got an old mule, and her name is Sal, Fifteen years on the Erie Canal
She's a good old worker and a good old pal, Fifteen years on the Erie Canal
We've hauled some barges in our day, filled with lumber, coal and hay.
And every inch of the way I know, From Albany to Buffalo

Low bridge, everybody down, Low bridge, we must be getting near a town.
You can always tell your neighbor; you can always tell your pal.
If he's ever navigated on the Erie Canal

We’d better look 'round for a job old gal, Fifteen years on the Erie Canal
You bet your life I wouldn’t part with Sal, Fifteen years on the Erie Canal
Giddyap there gal we’ve passed that lock, we’ll make Rome 'fore six o-clock
So one more trip and then we’ll go, Right straight back to Buffalo

Low bridge, everybody down, Low bridge, I've got the finest mule in town
Once a man named Mike McGinty tried to put it over Sal
Now he’s way down at the bottom of the Erie Canal

Oh, where would I be if I lost my pal? Fifteen years on the Erie Canal
Oh, I'd like to see a mule as good as Sal, Fifteen years on the Erie Canal
A friend of mine once got her sore, Now, he's got a broken jaw.
Cause she let fly with her iron toe and kicked him into Buffalo.

Low bridge, everybody down, Low bridge, I’ve got the finest mule in town.
If you're looking 'round for trouble, better stay away from Sal.
She's the only fighting donkey on the Erie Canal

I don't have to call when I want my Sal, Fifteen years on the Erie Canal
She trots from her stall like a good old gal, Fifteen years on the Erie Canal
I eat my meals with Sal each day, I eat beef and she eat hay.
She isn’t so slow if you want to know, she put the "Buff" in Buffalo

Chorus: Low bridge, everybody down, Low bridge, I’ve got the finest mule in town
Eats a bale of hay for dinner, and on top of that, my Sal.
Tries to drink up all the water in the Erie Canal

You'll soon hear them sing everything about my gal, Fifteen years on the Erie Canal
It's a darned fool ditty 'bout my darned fool Sal, Fifteen years on the Erie Canal
Oh, every band will play it soon, Darned fool words and darned fool tune!
You’ll hear it sung everywhere you go, from Mexico to Buffalo

Low bridge, everybody down, Low bridge, I've got the finest mule in town.
She's a perfect, perfect lady, and she blushes like a gal.
If she hears you sing about her and the Erie Canal.

=== Variations ===
As with most folk songs, the lyrics have changed over time. The most obvious changes from Thomas Allen's original publication has been changing the word "years" to "miles". Allen's original version commemorates 15 years of working along the canal with Sal. The new version using the word miles refers to the average distance a mule would tow a barge before resting or being relieved by another mule. Dave Ruch's research on this change has been documented in an extensive article.

Another common change is in the second verse. The current line "Git up there mule, here comes a lock" is a change from the original line "Get up there gal, we've passed that lock". The original refers to how mules would rest while waiting for barges to lock through, and then need to be instructed when to start again. The current implies speeding up when a lock is within sight—not a standard course of action.

==== Alternate lyrics ====
I've got a mule, and her name is Sal.
Fifteen miles on the Erie Canal
She's a good old worker and a good old pal.
Fifteen miles on the Erie Canal

We hauled some barges in our day.
Filled with lumber, coal and hay.
We know every inch of the way I know.
From Albany to Buffalo

Low bridge, everybody down
Low bridge, we're comin' to a town.
And you'll always know your neighbor.
And you'll always know your pal.
If ya ever navigated on the Erie Canal

We'd better look around for a job, old gal.
Fifteen miles on the Erie Canal
You can bet your life I'll never part with Sal.
Fifteen miles on the Erie Canal

Get up mule, here comes a lock.
We'll make Rome 'bout six o'clock.
One more trip and back we'll go.
Right back home to Buffalo

Low bridge, everybody down
Low bridge, we're comin' to a town.
You'll always know your neighbor.
And you'll always know your pal.
If ya ever navigated on the Erie Canal

Where would I be if I lost my pal?
Fifteen miles on the Erie Canal
I'd like to see a mule good as my Sal.
Fifteen miles on the Erie Canal

A friend of mine once got her sore.
Now he's got a broken jaw.
Cause she let fly with an iron toe.
And kicked him back to Buffalo.

Low bridge, everybody down
Low bridge, cause we're comin' to a town.
You'll always know your neighbor.
And you'll always know your pal.
If ya ever navigated on the Erie Canal

Low bridge, everybody down
Low bridge, we're comin' to a town.
You'll always know your neighbor.
And you'll always know your pal.
If ya ever made a livin' on the Erie Canal

(Low bridge, everybody down)
(Low bridge, we're comin' to a town)
