= Camillus Erie Canal Park =

Park in Camillus, New York, US

Coordinates: 43°03′09″N 76°18′14″W

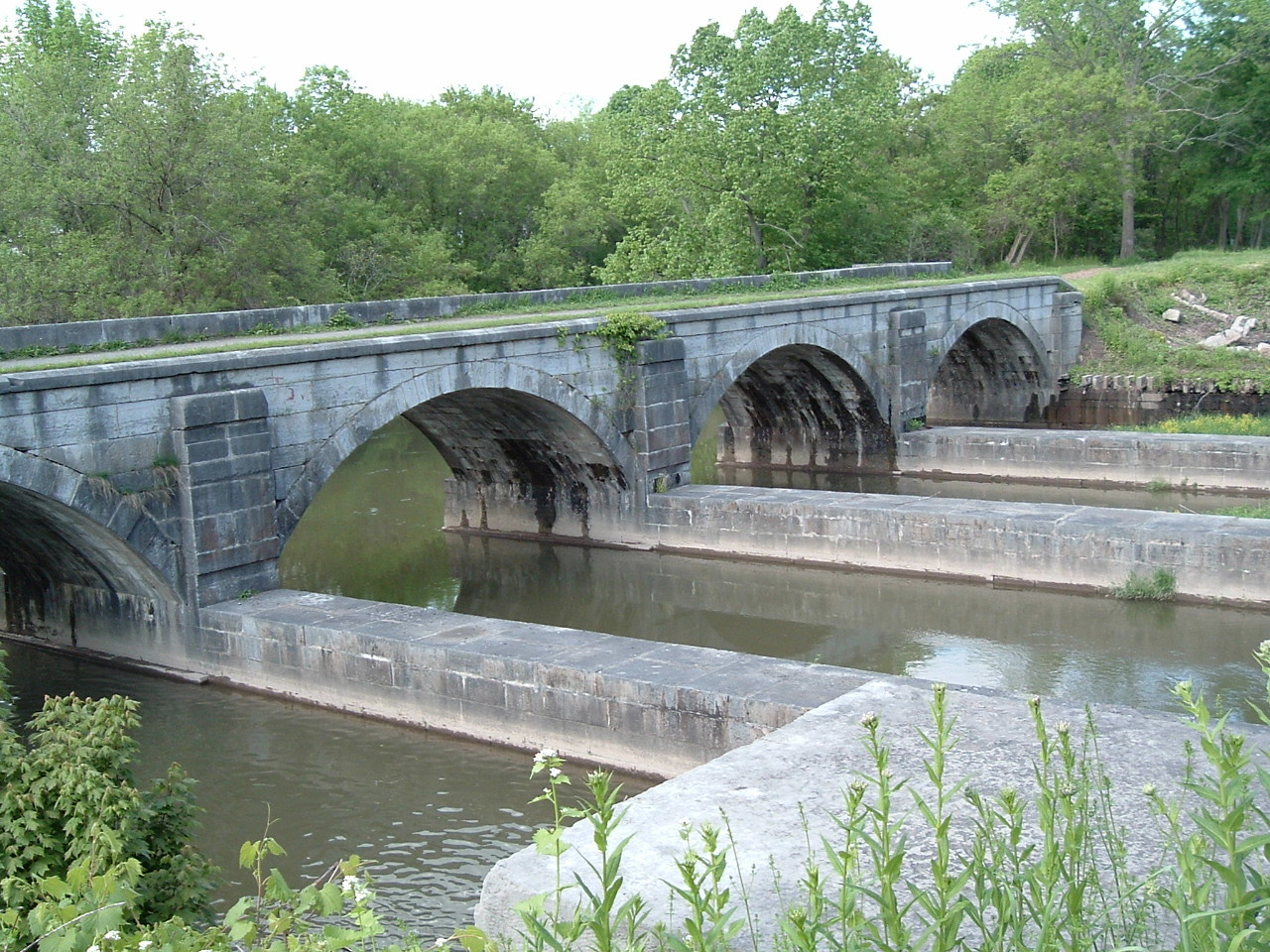
Nine Mile Creek running beneath aqueduct, shown before its 2009 restoration

Camillus Erie Canal Park is a town park in Camillus, New York, that preserves a seven-mile (11 km) stretch of the Erie Canal. It includes the Nine Mile Creek Aqueduct, which is listed on the National Register of Historic Places. The aqueduct underwent a $2 million restoration, completed in August 2009, which brought it back to navigable condition.

The park consists of 164 acres (0.66 km^{2}) along seven miles (11 km) of the old canal stretching from Warners Road to Newport Road. The park contains a replica of Sims' Store, a mid-19th-century canal store originally located about two miles east. The store is operated as a museum and gift shop. Other historic features include a salvaged set of lock gates from Old Erie Canal Lock 50 (Gere's Lock), a waste weir, a feeder canal, and the remnants of an earlier lock and aqueduct that were in use from 1825 to the mid-1840s. The remains of the original 1825 canal ("Clinton's Ditch") can also be viewed from a nature trail. The exact midpoint of the original Albany-Buffalo canal route is located in the park and denoted with a sign.

A separate display at the park features a Corliss steam engine rescued from a downtown Syracuse factory.

In 2007, the existing towpath between the Camillus park and the village of Jordan was improved to a stone dust trail as part of the New York State Canalway Trail project. There is much to be done in developing a continuous trail further.

== See also ==
- Jordan Canal Park
- Old Erie Canal State Historic Park
- Schoharie Crossing State Historic Site
