= Erie Canal =

Waterway in upstate New York, U.S.

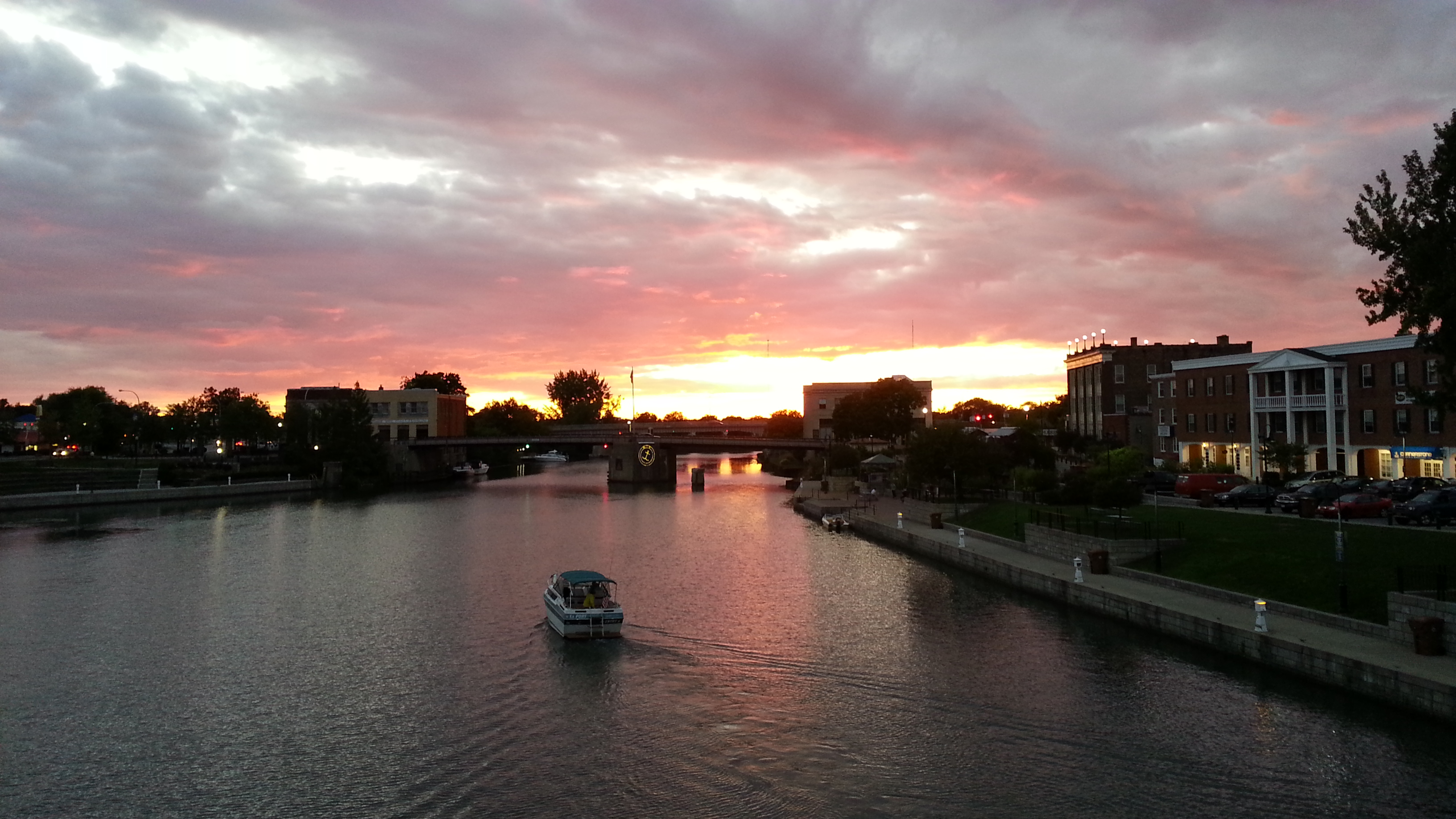
- The Erie Canal in North Tonawanda, NY
- Current route of the Erie Canal
- Location: Upstate New York
- Country: United States

Specifications
- Length: 351 miles (565 km) (originally 363 mi or 584 km)
- Lock length: 328 ft (100 m) (originally 90 ft or 27 m)
- Lock width: 45 ft (14 m) (originally 15 ft or 4.6 m)
- Maximum boat draft: 12 ft (3.7 m)
- Locks: 35
- Maximum height AMSL: 571 ft (174 m)
- Status: Open
- Navigation authority: New York State Canal Corporation

History
- Original owner: New York state
- Principal engineer: Benjamin Wright
- Other engineers: Canvass White, Amos Eaton
- Construction began: July 4, 1817; 209 years ago (at Rome, New York)
- Date of first use: May 17, 1821; 205 years ago
- Date completed: October 26, 1825; 200 years ago
- Date restored: September 3, 1999; 27 years ago

Geography
- Start point: Hudson River near Albany, New York
- End point: Niagara River near Buffalo, New York
- Beginning coordinates: 42.7834°N 73.6767°W
- Ending coordinates: 43.0237°N 78.8901°W
- Branches: Oswego Canal, Cayuga–Seneca Canal
- Branch of: New York State Canal System
- Connects to: Champlain Canal, Welland Canal

The Erie Canal is a historic canal in upstate New York that runs east–west between the Hudson River and Lake Erie. Completed in 1825, the canal was the first navigable waterway connecting the Atlantic Ocean to the upper Great Lakes above Niagara Falls, vastly reducing the costs of transporting people and goods across the Appalachians. The Erie Canal accelerated the settlement of the Great Lakes region, the westward expansion of the United States, and the economic ascendancy of New York state.

A canal from the Hudson River to the Great Lakes was first proposed in the 1780s, but a formal survey was not conducted until 1808. The New York State Legislature authorized construction in 1817. Political opponents of the canal, referring to its lead supporter New York Governor DeWitt Clinton, denigrated the project as "Clinton's Folly" and "Clinton's Big Ditch". The canal saw quick success upon opening on October 26, 1825, with toll revenue covering the state's construction debt within the first year of operation. The westward connection gave New York City a strong advantage over all other US ports and brought major growth to canal cities such as Albany, Utica, Syracuse, Rochester, and Buffalo.

The construction of the Erie Canal was a landmark civil engineering achievement in the early history of the United States. When built, the 363-mile (584 km) canal was the second-longest in the world after the Grand Canal in China. Initially 40 feet (12 m) wide and 4 feet (1.2 m) deep, the canal was expanded several times, most notably from 1905 to 1918 when the "Barge Canal" was built and over half the original route was abandoned. The modern canal measures 351 miles (565 km) long, 120 feet (37 m) wide, and 12 feet (3.7 m) deep. It has 35 locks, including the Waterford Flight, the steepest locks in the United States. When leaving the canal, boats must also traverse the Black Rock Lock to reach Lake Erie or the Troy Federal Lock to reach the tidal Hudson. The overall elevation difference is about 565 feet (172 m).

The Erie's peak year was 1855, when 33,000 commercial shipments took place. It continued to be competitive with railroads until about 1902, when tolls were abolished. Commercial traffic declined heavily in the latter half of the 20th century due to competition from trucking via the newly developed Interstate Highway System and the 1959 opening of the larger St. Lawrence Seaway. The canal's last regularly scheduled hauler, the Day Peckinpaugh, ended service in 1994.

Today, the Erie Canal is mainly used by recreational watercraft. It connects the three other canals in the New York State Canal System: the Champlain, Oswego, and Cayuga–Seneca. Some long-distance boaters take the Erie as part of the Great Loop. The canal has also become a tourist attraction in its own right—numerous parks and museums are dedicated to its history. The New York State Canalway Trail is a popular cycling path that follows the canal across the state. In 2000, Congress designated the Erie Canalway National Heritage Corridor to protect and promote the system.

== Ambiguity in name ==
The waterway today referred to as the Erie Canal is quite different from the nineteenth-century Erie Canal. More than half of the original Erie Canal was destroyed or abandoned during construction of the New York State Barge Canal in the early 20th century. The sections of the original route remaining in use were widened significantly, mostly west of Syracuse, with bridges rebuilt and locks replaced. It was called the Barge Canal at the time, but that name fell into disuse with the disappearance of commercial traffic and the increase of recreational travel in the later 20th century.

== History ==
=== Background ===
The Mohawk Valley, running east and west, cuts a natural path between the Catskill Mountains to the south and the Adirondack Mountains to the north.

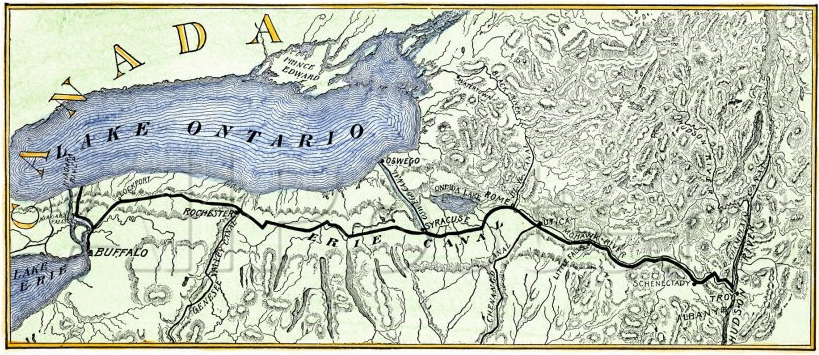
A map of the Erie Canal c. 1840

Before railroads, water transport was the most cost-effective way to ship bulk goods. A mule can only carry about 250 pounds (110 kg) but can draw a barge weighing as much as 60,000 pounds (27,000 kg) along a towpath. In total, a canal could cut transport costs by about 95 percent.

In the early years of the United States, transportation of goods between the coastal ports and the interior was slow and difficult. Close to the seacoast, rivers provided easy inland transport up to the fall line, since floating vessels encounter much less friction than land vehicles. However, the Appalachian Mountains were a great obstacle to further transportation or settlement, stretching 1,500 miles (2,400 km) from Maine to Alabama, with just five places where mule trains or wagon roads could be routed. Passengers and freight bound for the western parts of the country had to travel overland, a journey made more difficult by the rough condition of the roads. In 1800, it typically took 2½ weeks to travel overland from New York to Cleveland, Ohio, (460 miles; 740 km) and 4 weeks to Detroit (612 miles; 985 km).

The principal exportable product of the Ohio Valley was grain, which was a high-volume, low-priced commodity, bolstered by supplies from the coast. Frequently, it was not worth the cost of transporting it to far-away population centers. This was a factor leading to farmers in the west turning their grains into whiskey for easier transport and higher sales, and later the Whiskey Rebellion. In the 18th and early 19th centuries, it became clear to coastal residents that the city or state that succeeded in developing a cheap, reliable route to the West would enjoy economic success, and the port at the seaward end of such a route would see business increase greatly. In time, projects were devised in Virginia, Maryland, Pennsylvania, and relatively deep into the coastal states.

==== Topography ====
The Mohawk River (a tributary of the Hudson River) rises near Lake Ontario and runs in a glacial meltwater channel just north of the Catskill range of the Appalachian Mountains, separating them from the geologically distinct Adirondacks to the north. The Mohawk and Hudson valleys form the only cut across the Appalachians north of Alabama. A navigable canal through the Mohawk Valley would allow an almost complete water route from New York City in the south to Lake Ontario and Lake Erie in the west. Via the canal and these lakes, other Great Lakes, and to a lesser degree, related rivers, a large part of the continent's interior and many settlements would be made well connected to the Eastern seaboard.

=== Conception ===
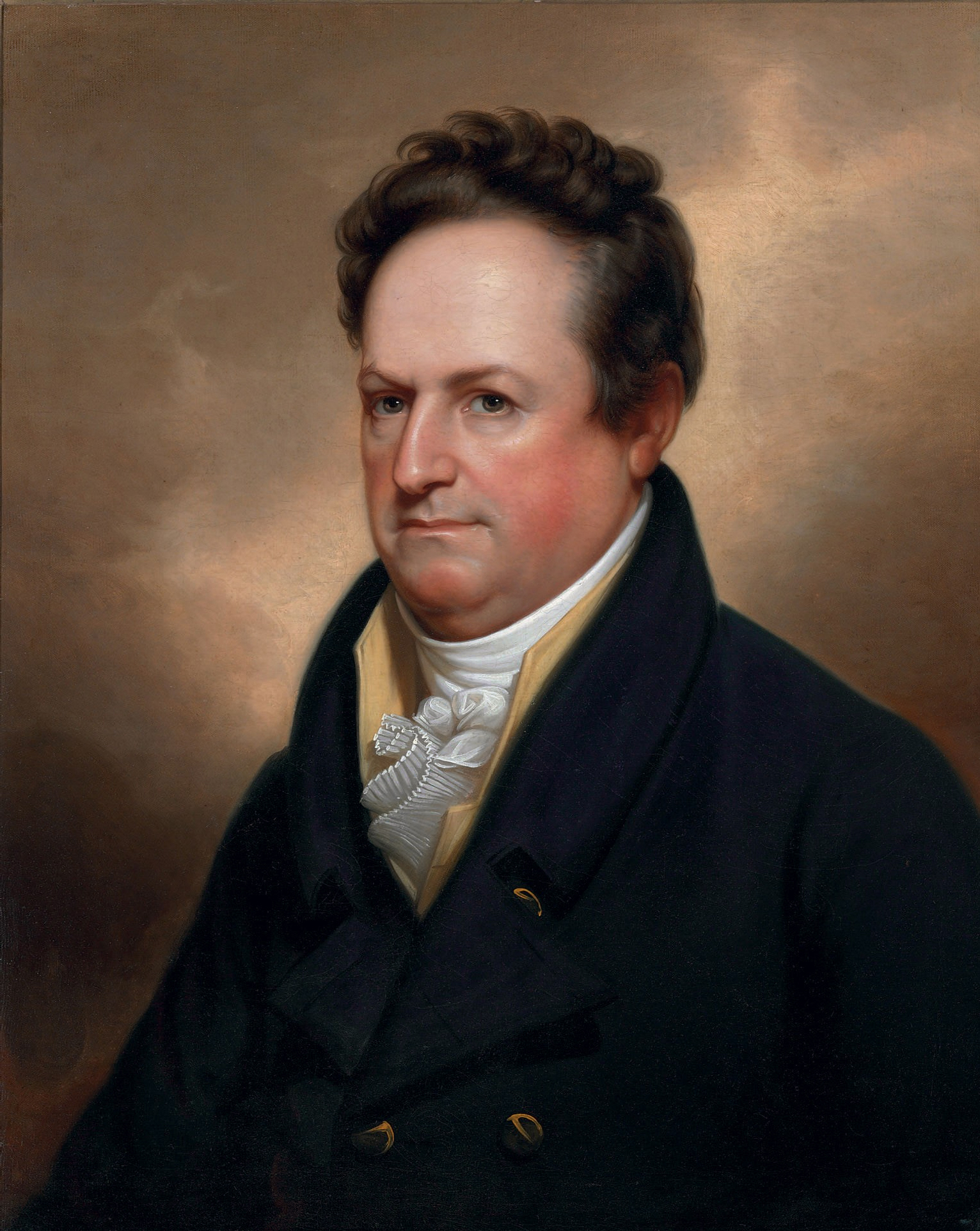
Portrait of DeWitt Clinton by Rembrandt Peale, 1823. Clinton was Governor of New York and a champion of the canal

Among the first attempts made by European colonists to improve upon the future state's navigable waterways was the construction in 1702 of the Wood Creek Carry, or Oneida Carry, a short portage road connecting Wood Creek to the Mohawk River near modern-day Rome, New York. The first documented instance of the idea of a canal to tie the East Coast to the new western settlements via New York's waterways was discussed as early as 1724: New York provincial official Cadwallader Colden made a passing reference in a report on fur trading to improving the natural waterways of western New York.

Colden and subsequent figures in the history of the Erie Canal and its development drew inspiration from other great works of the so-called canal age, including France's Canal du Midi and the Bridgewater Canal in England. The attempt in the 1780s by George Washington to build a canal from the tidewaters of the Potomac into the fledgling nation's interior was also well known to the planners of the Erie Canal.

Gouverneur Morris and Elkanah Watson were early proponents of a canal along the Mohawk River. Their efforts led to the creation of the "Western and Northern Inland Lock Navigation Companies" in 1792, which took the first steps to improve navigation on the Mohawk and construct a canal between the Mohawk and Lake Ontario, but it was soon discovered that private financing was insufficient. Christopher Colles, who was familiar with the Bridgewater Canal, surveyed the Mohawk Valley, and made a presentation to the New York state legislature in 1784, proposing a shorter canal from Lake Ontario. The proposal drew attention and some action but was never implemented.

Jesse Hawley had envisioned encouraging the growing of large quantities of grain on the western New York plains, then largely unsettled, for sale on the Eastern seaboard. However, he went bankrupt trying to ship grain to the coast. While in Canandaigua debtors' prison, Hawley began pressing for the construction of a canal along the 90-mile-long (140 km) Mohawk River valley. Support for a canal also came from Joseph Ellicott, agent for the Holland Land Company in Batavia. Ellicott realized that a canal would add value to the land he was selling in the western part of the state and served as one of the original Canal Commissioners.

New York legislators became interested in the possibility of building a canal across New York in the first decade of the 19th century. Shipping goods west from Albany was a costly and tedious affair; there was no railroad yet, and to cover the distance from Buffalo to New York City by stagecoach took two weeks. The problem was that the land rises about 600 feet (180 m) from the Hudson to Lake Erie. Locks at the time could handle up to 12 feet (3.7 m) of lift, so even with the heftiest cuttings and viaducts, fifty locks would be required along the 360-mile (580 km) canal. Such a canal would be expensive to build even with modern technology; in 1800, the expense was barely imaginable. President Thomas Jefferson called it "little short of madness" and rejected it.

Eventually, Hawley interested New York Governor DeWitt Clinton in the project. There was much opposition, and the project was ridiculed as "Clinton's folly" and "Clinton's ditch". In 1817, though, Clinton received approval from the legislature for $7 million for construction.

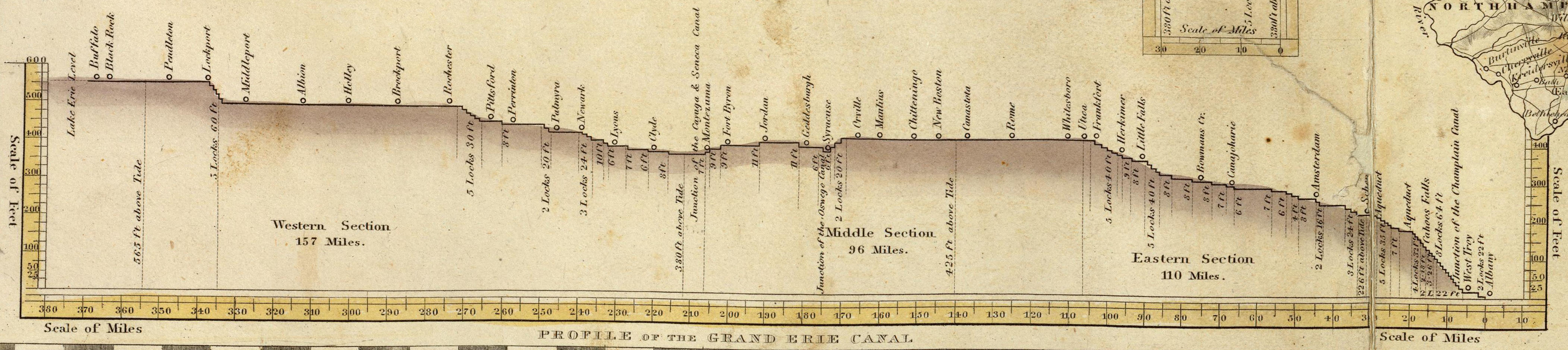
Profile of the original canal

=== Construction ===
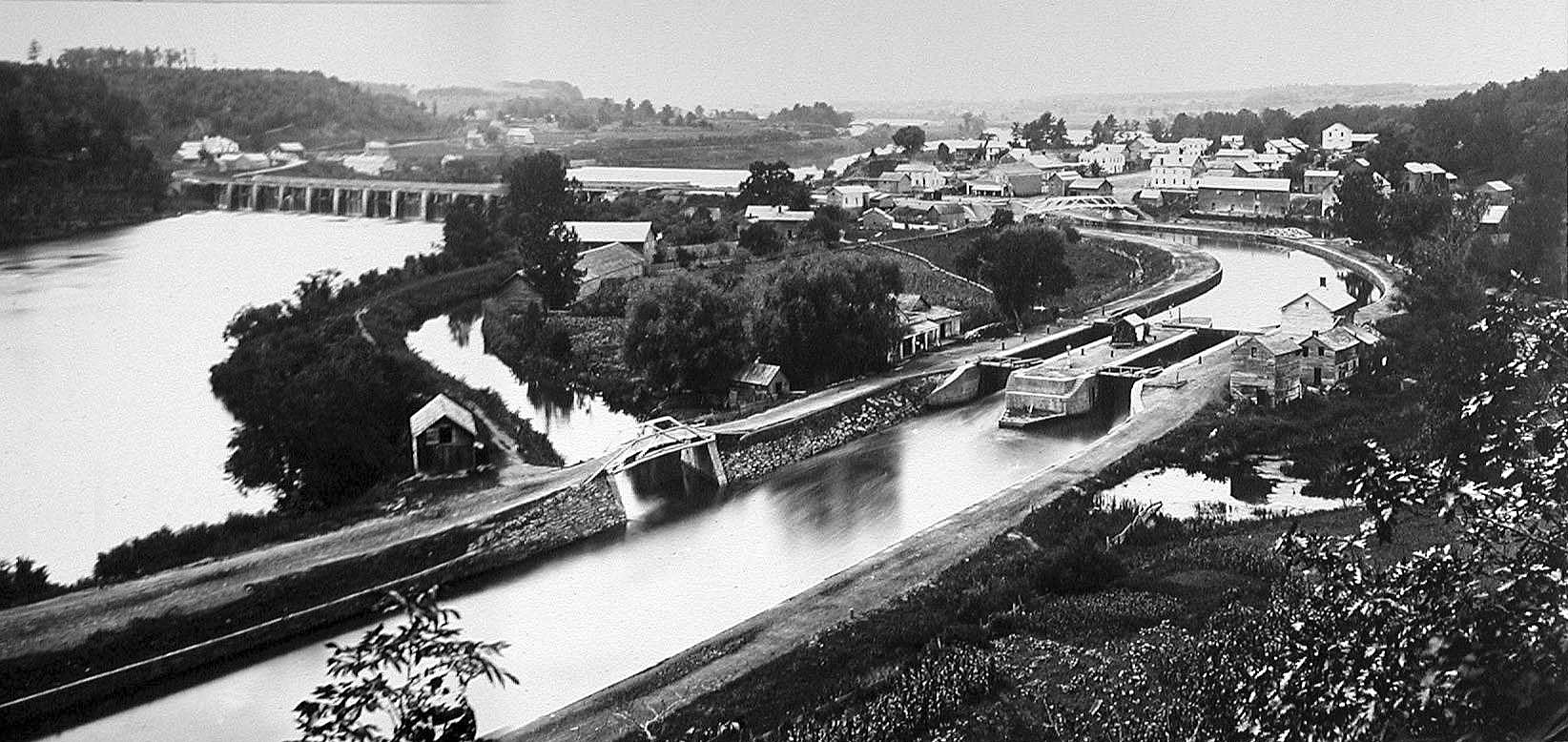
Aqueduct over the Mohawk River at Rexford, one of 32 navigable aqueducts on the Erie Canal

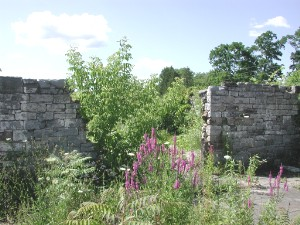
Stonework of lock abandoned because of route change, at Durhamville, New York

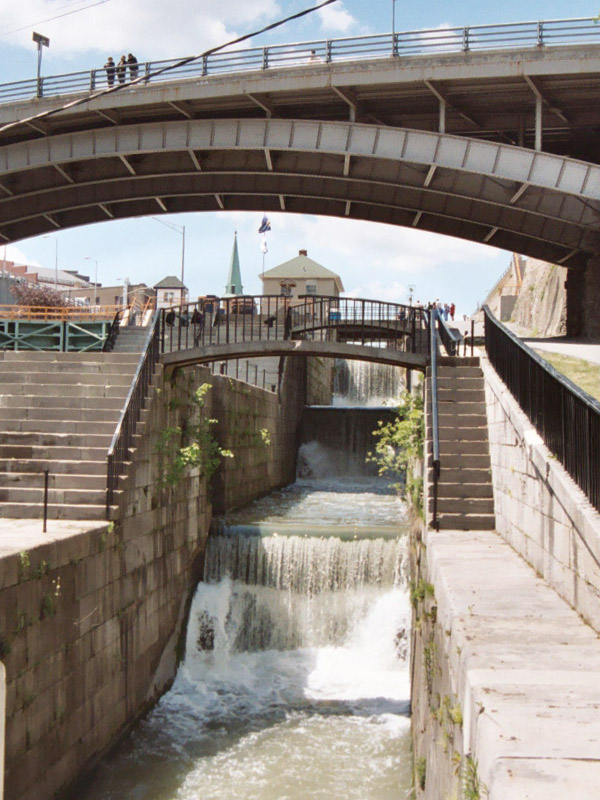
An original five-step lock structure crossing the Niagara Escarpment at Lockport, now without gates and used as a cascade for excess water

The original canal was 363 miles (584 km) long, from Albany on the Hudson to Buffalo on Lake Erie. The channel was cut 40 feet (12 m) wide and 4 feet (1.2 m) deep, with removed soil piled on the downhill side to form a walkway known as a towpath. Its construction, through limestone and mountains, proved a daunting task. To move earth, animals pulled a "slip scraper" (similar to a bulldozer). The sides of the canal were lined with stone set in clay, and the bottom was also lined with clay. The Canal was built by Irish laborers and German stonemasons. All labor on the canal depended upon human and animal power or the force of water. Engineering techniques developed during its construction included the building of aqueducts to redirect water; one aqueduct was 950 feet (290 m) long to span 800 feet (240 m) of river. As the canal progressed, the crews and engineers working on the project developed expertise and became a skilled labor force.

The men who planned and oversaw construction were novices as surveyors and as engineers. There were no civil engineers in the United States. James Geddes and Benjamin Wright, who laid out the route, were judges whose experience in surveying was in settling boundary disputes. Geddes had only used a surveying instrument for a few hours before his work on the Canal. Canvass White was a 27-year-old amateur engineer who persuaded Clinton to let him go to Britain at his own expense to study the canal system there. Nathan Roberts was a mathematics teacher and land speculator. Yet these men "carried the Erie Canal up the Niagara escarpment at Lockport, maneuvered it onto a towering embankment to cross over Irondequoit Creek, spanned the Genesee River on an awesome aqueduct, and carved a route for it out of the solid rock between Little Falls and Schenectady—and all of those venturesome designs worked precisely as planned".

Construction began on July 4, 1817, at Rome, New York. The first 15 miles (24 km), from Rome to Utica, opened in 1819. At that rate, the canal would not be finished for 30 years. The main delays were caused by felling trees to clear a path through virgin forest and moving excavated soil, which took longer than expected, but the builders devised ways to solve these problems. To fell a tree, they threw rope over the top branches and winched it down. They pulled out the stumps with an innovative stump puller. Two huge wheels were mounted loose on the ends of an axle. A third wheel, slightly smaller than the others, was fixed to the center of the axle. A chain was wrapped around the axle and hooked to the stump. A rope was wrapped around the center wheel and hooked to a team of oxen. The mechanical advantage (torque) obtained ripped the stumps out of the soil. Soil to be moved was shoveled into large wheelbarrows that were dumped into mule-pulled carts. Using a scraper and a plow, a three-man team with oxen, horses and mules could build a mile in a year.

The remaining problem was finding labor; increased immigration helped fill the need. Many of the laborers working on the canal were Irish, who had recently come to the United States as a group of about 5,000. Most of them were Roman Catholic, a religion that raised much suspicion in early America because of its hierarchic structure, and many laborers on the canal suffered violent assault as the result of misjudgment and xenophobia.

Construction continued at an increased rate as new workers arrived. When the canal reached Montezuma Marsh (at the outlet of Cayuga Lake west of Syracuse), it was rumored that over 1,000 workers died of "swamp fever" (malaria), and construction was temporarily stopped. However, recent research has revealed that the death toll was likely much lower, as no contemporary reports mention significant worker mortality, and mass graves from the period have never been found in the area. Work continued on the downhill side towards the Hudson, and the crews worked on the section across the swampland when it froze in winter.

The middle section from Utica to Salina (Syracuse) was completed in 1820, and traffic on that section started up immediately. Expansion to the east and west proceeded simultaneously, and the whole eastern section, 250 miles (400 km) from Brockport to Albany, opened on September 10, 1823, to great fanfare. The Champlain Canal, a separate but connected 64-mile (103 km) north–south route from Watervliet on the Hudson to Lake Champlain, opened on the same date.

After Montezuma Marsh, the next difficulties were crossing Irondequoit Creek and the Genesee River near Rochester. The former ultimately required building the 1,320-foot (400 m) long "Great Embankment", to carry the canal at a height of 76 feet (23 m) above the level of the creek, which ran through a 245-foot (75 m) culvert underneath. The canal crossed the river on a stone aqueduct, 802 feet (244 m) long and 17 feet (5.2 m) wide, supported by 11 arches.

In 1823 construction reached the Niagara Escarpment, an 80-foot-high (24 m) wall of hard dolomitic limestone. The route followed the channel of a creek that had cut a ravine steeply down the escarpment. The construction and operation of two sets of five locks along a 3-mile (4.8 km) corridor soon gave rise to the community of Lockport. The 12-foot (3.7 m) lift-locks had a total lift of 60 feet (18 m), exiting into a deeply cut channel. The final leg had to be cut 30 feet (9.1 m) deep through another limestone mass, the Onondaga ridge. Much of that section was blasted with black powder, and the inexperience of the crews often led to accidents, and sometimes to rocks falling on nearby homes.

Two villages competed to be the terminus: Black Rock, on the Niagara River, and Buffalo, at the eastern tip of Lake Erie. Buffalo expended great energy to widen and deepen Buffalo Creek to make it navigable and to create a harbor at its mouth. Buffalo won over Black Rock, and grew into a large city, eventually annexing its former rival.

=== Completion ===
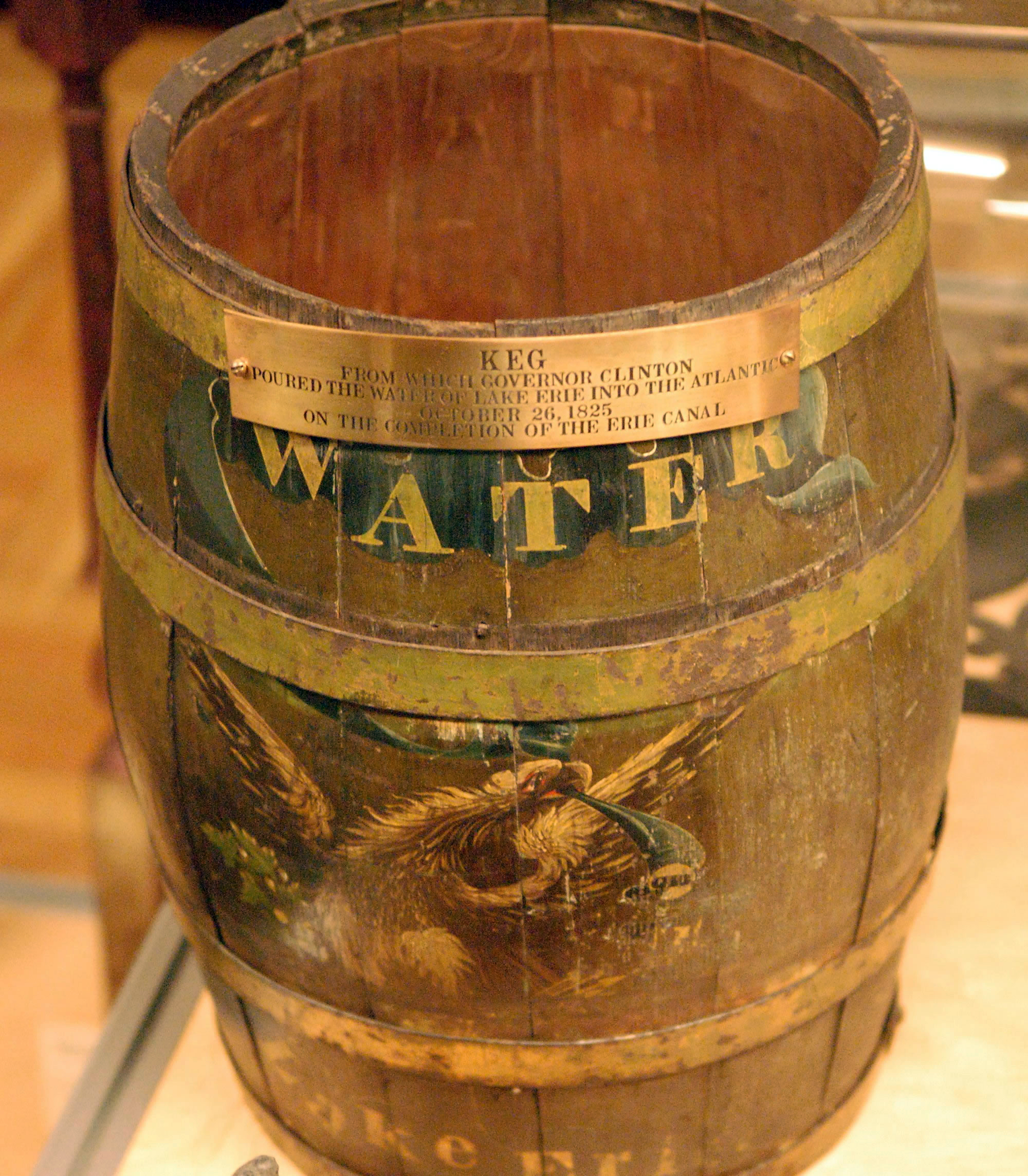
Keg poured in the "Wedding of the Waters"

In 1824, before the canal was completed, a detailed Pocket Guide for the Tourist and Traveler, Along the Line of the Canals, and the Interior Commerce of the State of New York, was published for the benefit of travelers and land speculators.

The entire canal was officially completed on October 26, 1825. The event was marked by a statewide "Grand Celebration", culminating in a series of cannon shots along the length of the canal and the Hudson, a 90-minute cannonade from Buffalo to New York City. A flotilla of boats, led by Governor Dewitt Clinton aboard Seneca Chief, sailed from Buffalo to New York City over ten days. Clinton then ceremonially poured Lake Erie water into New York Harbor to mark the "Wedding of the Waters". On its return trip, Seneca Chief brought back a keg of Atlantic Ocean water, which was poured into Lake Erie by Buffalo's Judge Samuel Wilkeson, who would later become mayor.

The Erie Canal was thus completed in eight years at a total length of 353 miles (568 km) and cost $7.143 million (equivalent to $203 million in 2025). It was acclaimed as an engineering marvel that united the country and helped New York City develop as an international trade center.

Problems developed but were quickly solved. Leaks developed along the entire length of the canal, but these were sealed using cement that hardened underwater (hydraulic cement). Erosion on the clay bottom proved to be a problem and the speed was limited to 4 mph (6.4 km/h).

=== Branch canals ===
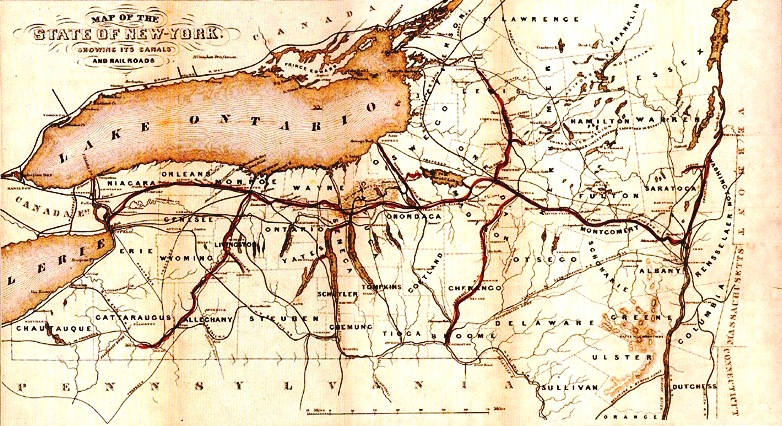
1853 map of New York canals

Additional feeder canals soon extended the Erie Canal into a system. These included the Cayuga-Seneca Canal south to the Finger Lakes, the Oswego Canal from Three Rivers north to Lake Ontario at Oswego, and the Champlain Canal from Troy north to Lake Champlain. From 1833 to 1877, the short Crooked Lake Canal connected Keuka Lake and Seneca Lake. The Chemung Canal connected the south end of Seneca Lake to Elmira in 1833, and was an important route for Pennsylvania coal and timber into the canal system. The Chenango Canal in 1836 connected the Erie Canal at Utica to Binghamton and caused a business boom in the Chenango River valley. The Chenango and Chemung canals linked the Erie with the Susquehanna River system. The Black River Canal connected the Black River to the Erie Canal at Rome and remained in operation until the 1920s. The Genesee Valley Canal was run along the Genesee River to connect with the Allegheny River at Olean, but the Allegheny section, which would have connected to the Ohio and Mississippi rivers, was never built. The Genesee Valley Canal was later abandoned and became the route of the Genesee Valley Canal Railroad.

=== First enlargement ===
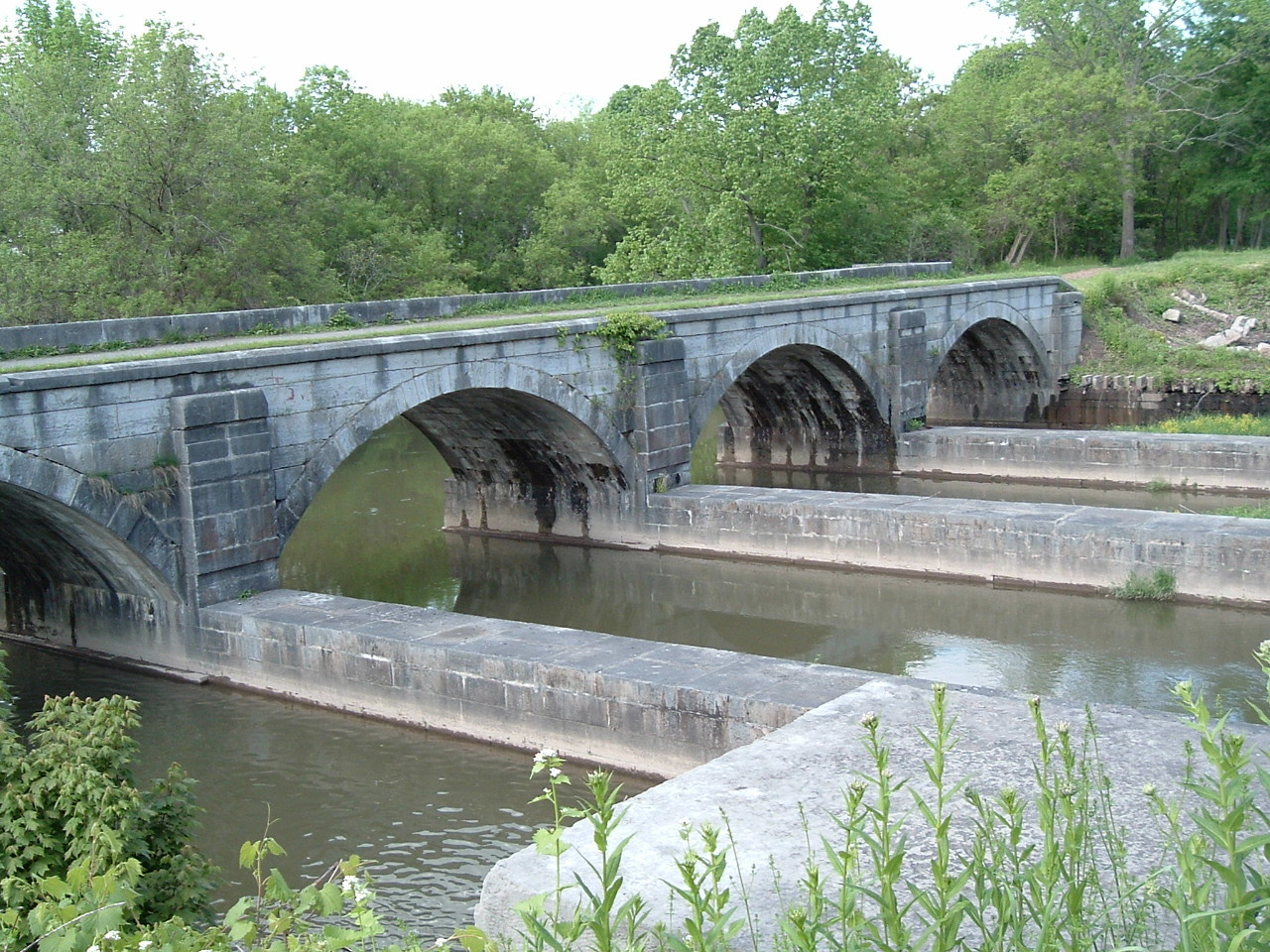
Aqueduct over Nine Mile Creek north of Camillus, New York, built in 1841 and abandoned c. 1918; one of 32 navigable aqueducts on the Erie Canal, it has since been restored.

The original design planned for an annual tonnage of 1.5 million tons (1.36 million metric tons), but this was exceeded immediately. Such high levels of traffic along the canal caused increasing deterioration of the canal walls, requiring maintenance and improvement. Around 1833, many locks and aqueducts were found to be in need of replacing. An ambitious program to improve the canal began in 1834, partially as a result of the need for repairs to infrastructure, but mostly because of extreme crowding particularly on the eastern portion of the canal. During this massive series of construction projects, known as the First Enlargement, the canal was widened from 40 to 70 feet (12 to 21 m) and deepened from 4 to 7 feet (1.2 to 2.1 m). Locks were widened, doubled, or rebuilt in new locations, and many new navigable aqueducts were constructed. The canal was straightened and slightly re-routed in some stretches, resulting in the abandonment of short segments of the original 1825 canal. The First Enlargement was declared to be completed in 1862 after economic struggles, with further minor enlargements in later decades.

=== Railroad competition ===
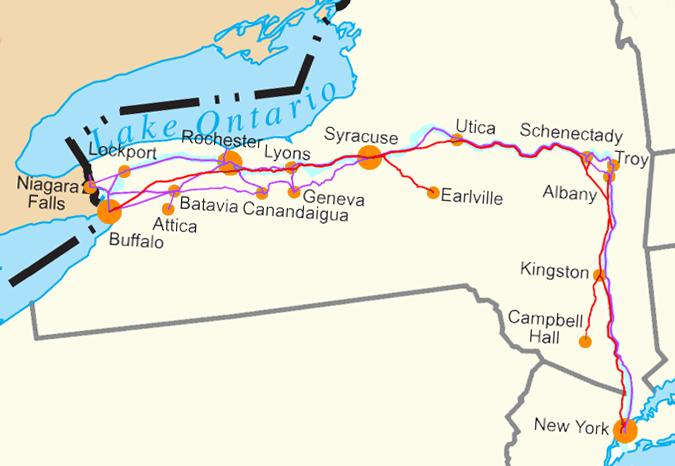
Map of the "Water Level Routes" of the New York Central Railroad (purple), West Shore Railroad (red) and Erie Canal (blue)

The Mohawk and Hudson Railroad opened in 1837, providing a bypass to the slowest part of the canal between Albany and Schenectady. Other railroads were soon chartered and built to continue the line west to Buffalo, and in 1842 a continuous line (which later became the New York Central Railroad and its Auburn Road in 1853) was open the whole way to Buffalo. As the railroad served the same general route as the canal, but provided for faster travel, passengers soon switched to it. However, as late as 1852, the canal carried thirteen times more freight tonnage than all the railroads in New York State combined. The New York, West Shore and Buffalo Railway was completed in 1884, as a route running closely parallel to both the canal and the New York Central Railroad. However, it went bankrupt and was acquired the next year by the New York Central.

In 1880s, the canal was struggling to remain competitive with the railroads. The NY State Legislature passed an amendment to the state constitution allowing for the end of toll on the canal in 1881 and 1882. In 1882, the amendment was approved by voters, and on January 1, 1883, the new amendment went into effect, ending the charging of tolls along the NY State canals.

=== Barge Canal ===
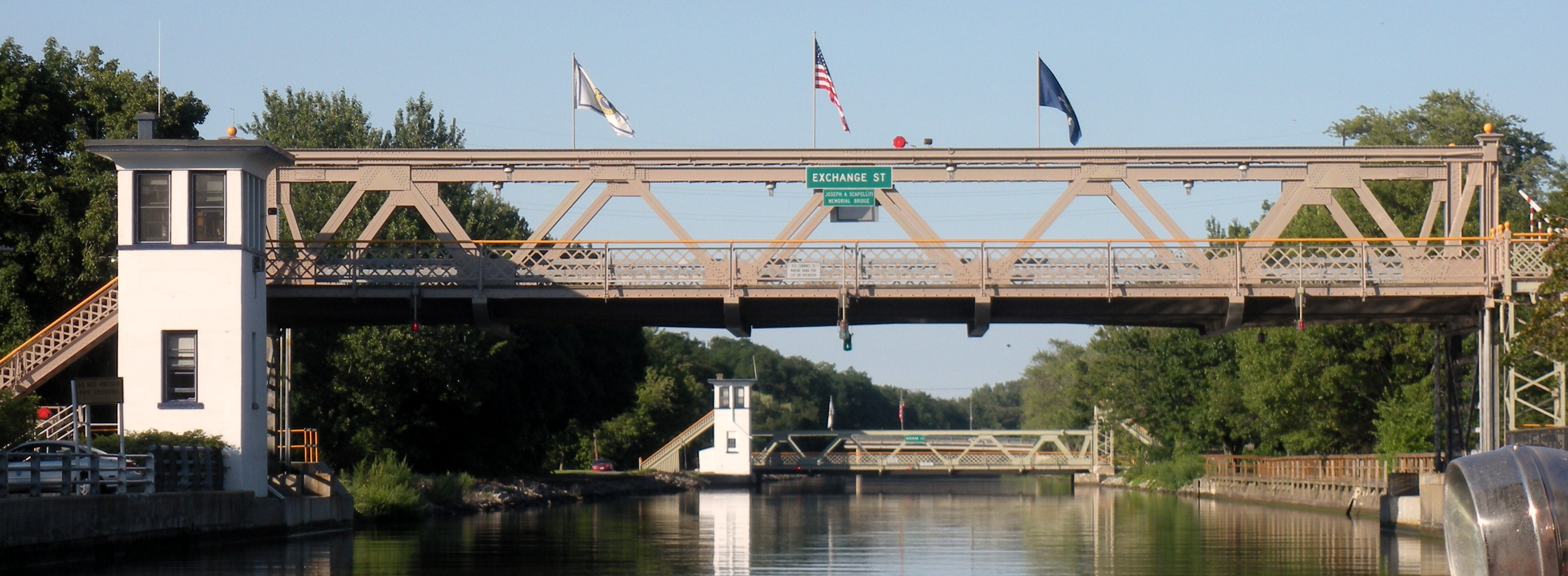
Two lift bridges in Lockport, New York, July 2010

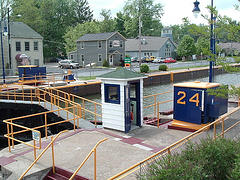
The modern Erie Canal has 34 locks, which are painted with the blue and gold colors of the New York State Canal System.

In a November 3, 1903 referendum, a majority of New Yorkers authorized an expansion of the canal at a cost of $101,000,000. In 1905, construction of the New York State Barge Canal began, which was completed in 1918, at a cost of $96.7 million.

This new canal replaced much of the original route, leaving many abandoned sections (most notably between Syracuse and Rome). New digging and flood control technologies allowed engineers to canalize rivers that the original canal had sought to avoid, such as the Mohawk, Seneca, and Clyde rivers, and Oneida Lake. In sections that did not consist of canalized rivers (particularly between Rochester and Buffalo), the original Erie Canal channel was enlarged to 120 feet (37 m) wide and 12 feet (3.7 m) deep. The expansion allowed barges up to 2,000 short tons (1,800 t) to use the Canal. The new Barge Canal required boats to be propelled by tugs or other mechanical means, as there was no longer a towpath along the system for animal power to tow barges. This expensive expansion project was politically unpopular in parts of the state not served by the canal. Following the opening of the barge canal, there was a resurgence in use for some industries and commercial shipping along the system peaked in 1951.

=== Commercial decline ===
Freight traffic reached a total of 5.2 million short tons (4.7 million metric tons) by 1951. The growth of railroads and highways across the state, and the opening of the St. Lawrence Seaway in 1959, caused commercial traffic on the canal to decline dramatically during the second half of the 20th century. Since the 1990s, the canal system has been used primarily by recreational traffic.

=== New York State Canal System ===
In 1992, the New York State Barge Canal was renamed the New York State Canal System (including the Erie, Cayuga-Seneca, Oswego, and Champlain canals) and placed under the newly created New York State Canal Corporation, a subsidiary of the New York State Thruway Authority. While part of the Thruway, the canal system was operated using money generated by Thruway tolls. In 2017, the New York State Canal Corporation was transferred from the New York State Thruway to the New York Power Authority.

In 2000, Congress designated the Erie Canalway National Heritage Corridor, covering 524 miles (843 km) of navigable water from Lake Champlain to the Capital Region and west to Buffalo. The area has a population of 2.7 million; about 75% of Central and Western New York's population lives within 25 miles (40 km) of the Erie Canal.

There were some 42 commercial shipments on the canal in 2008, compared to 15 such shipments in 2007 and more than 33,000 shipments in 1855, the canal's peak year. The new growth in commercial traffic is due to the rising cost of diesel fuel. Canal barges can carry a short ton of cargo 514 miles (827 km) on one gallon of diesel fuel, while a gallon allows a train to haul the same amount of cargo 202 miles (325 km) and a truck 59 miles (95 km). Canal barges can carry loads up to 3,000 short tons (2,700 long tons), and are used to transport objects that would be too large for road or rail shipment. In 2012, the New York State Canal System as a whole was used to ship 42,000 tons of cargo.

== Route ==
=== Original Canal ===
The Erie Canal after the First Great Enlargement

The Erie made use of the favorable conditions of New York's unique topography, which provided that area with the only break in the Appalachians south of the St. Lawrence River. The Hudson is tidal to Troy, and Albany is west of the Appalachians. It allowed for east–west navigation from the coast to the Great Lakes within US territory.

The canal began on the west side of the Hudson River at Albany, and ran north to Watervliet, where the Champlain Canal branched off. At Cohoes, it climbed the escarpment on the west side of the Hudson River—16 locks rising 140 feet (43 m)—and then turned west along the south shore of the Mohawk River, crossing to the north side at Crescent and again to the south at Rexford. The canal continued west near the south shore of the Mohawk River all the way to Rome, where the Mohawk turns north.

At Rome, the canal continued west parallel to Wood Creek, which flows westward into Oneida Lake, and turned southwest and west cross-country to avoid the lake. From Canastota west, it ran roughly along the north (lower) edge of the Onondaga Escarpment, passing through Syracuse, Onondaga Lake, and Rochester. Before reaching Rochester, the canal uses a series of natural ridges to cross the deep valley of Irondequoit Creek. At Lockport the canal turned southwest to rise to the top of the Niagara Escarpment, using the ravine of Eighteen Mile Creek.

The canal continued south-southwest to Pendleton, where it turned west and southwest, mainly using the channel of Tonawanda Creek. From the Tonawanda south toward Buffalo, it ran just east of the Niagara River, where it reached its "Western Terminus" at Little Buffalo Creek (later it became the Commercial Slip), which discharged into the Buffalo River just above its confluence with Lake Erie. With Buffalo's re-excavation of the Commercial Slip, completed in 2008, the Canal's original terminus is now re-watered and again accessible by boats. With several miles of the Canal inland of this location still lying under 20th-century fill and urban construction, the effective western navigable terminus of the Erie Canal is found at Tonawanda.

=== Barge Canal ===
The new alignment began on the Hudson River at the border between Cohoes and Waterford, where it ran northwest with five locks (the so-called "Waterford Flight"), running into the Mohawk River east of Crescent. The Waterford Flight is claimed to be one of the steepest series of locks in the world.

While the old Canal ran next to the Mohawk all the way to Rome, the new canal ran through the river, which was straightened or widened where necessary. At Ilion, the new canal left the river for good, but continued to run on a new alignment parallel to both the river and the old canal to Rome. From Rome, the new route continued almost due west, merging with Fish Creek just east of its entry into Oneida Lake.

From Oneida Lake, the new canal ran west along the Oneida River, with cutoffs to shorten the route. At Three Rivers, the Oneida River turns northwest, and was deepened for the Oswego Canal to Lake Ontario. The new Erie Canal turned south there along the Seneca River, which turns west near Syracuse and continues west to a point in the Montezuma Marsh. There the Cayuga and Seneca Canal continued south with the Seneca River, and the new Erie Canal again ran parallel to the old canal along the bottom of the Niagara Escarpment, in some places running along the Clyde River, and in some places replacing the old canal. At Pittsford, southeast of Rochester, the canal turned west to run around the south side of Rochester, rather than through downtown. The canal crosses the Genesee River at the Genesee Valley Park, then rejoins the old path near North Gates.

From there it was again roughly an upgrade to the original canal, running west to Lockport. This reach of 64.2 miles (103.3 km) from Henrietta to Lockport is called "the 60‑mile level" since there are no locks and the water level rises only two feet (0.61 m) over the entire segment. Diversions from and to adjacent natural streams along the way are used to maintain the canal's level. It runs southwest to Tonawanda, where the new alignment discharges into the Niagara River, which is navigable upstream to the New York Barge Canal's Black Rock Lock and thence to the Canal's original "Western Terminus" at Buffalo's Inner Harbor.

== Operations ==
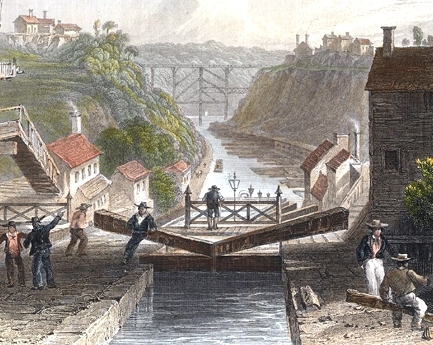
Operations at Lockport, New York, in 1839

=== Freight boats ===
Canal boats up to 3.5 feet (1.1 m) in draft were pulled by horses and mules walking on the towpath. The canal had one towpath, generally on the north side. When canal boats met, the boat with the right of way remained on the towpath side of the canal. The other boat steered toward the berm (or heelpath) side of the canal. The driver (or "hoggee", pronounced HO-gee) of the privileged boat kept his towpath team by the canalside edge of the towpath.

The hoggee of the other boat moved to the outside of the towpath and stopped his team. His towline would be unhitched from the horses, go slack, fall into the water and sink to the bottom, while his boat coasted with its remaining momentum. The privileged boat's team would step over the other boat's towline, with its horses pulling the boat over the sunken towline without stopping. Once clear, the other boat's team would continue on its way.

Pulled by teams of horses, canal boats moved slowly, but methodically, shrinking time and distance. Efficiently, the smooth, nonstop method of transportation cut the travel time between Albany and Buffalo nearly in half, moving by day and by night. Migrants took passage on freight boats, camping on deck or on top of crates.

=== Passenger boats ===
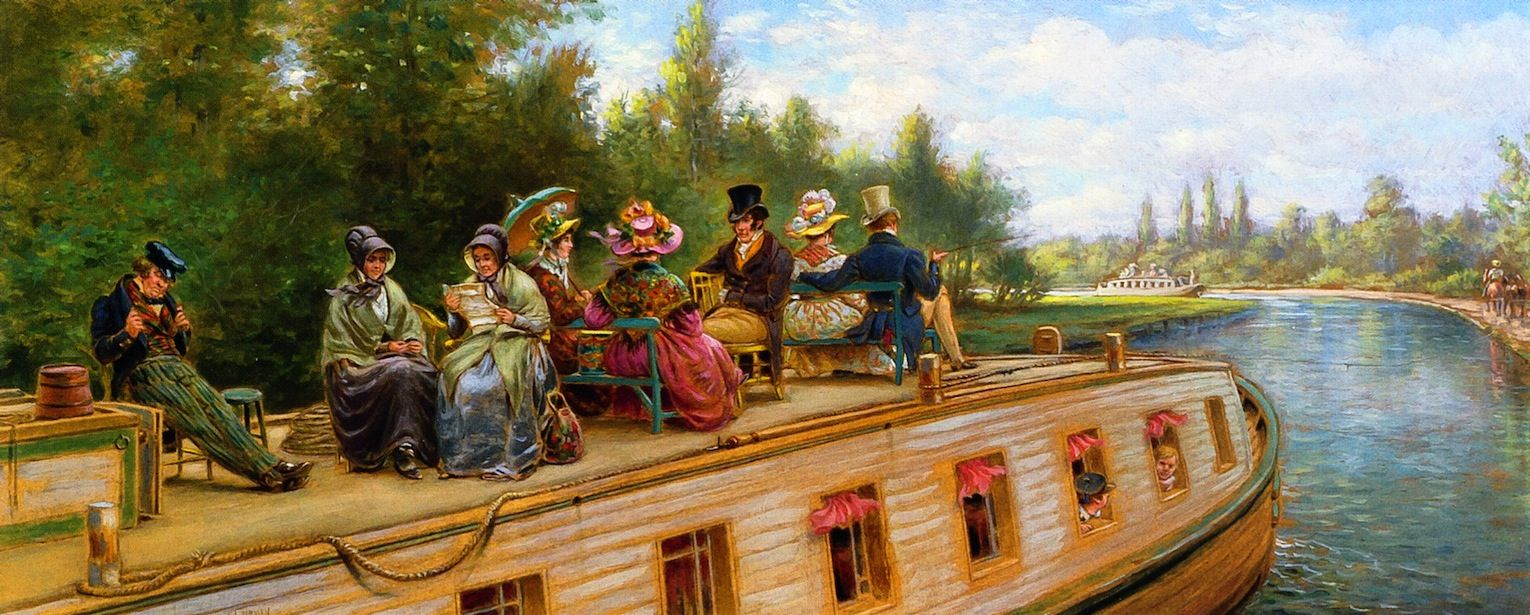
Nearing the Bend, a nostalgic image of early canal travel by Edward Lamson Henry, c. 1900

Packet boats, serving passengers exclusively, reached speeds of up to five miles per hour (8.0 km/h) and ran at much more frequent intervals than the cramped, bumpy stagecoach wagons. These boats, measuring up to 78 feet (24 m) long and 14.5 feet (4.4 m) wide, made ingenious use of space, accommodating up to 40 passengers at night and up to three times as many in the daytime.

The best examples, furnished with carpeted floors, stuffed chairs, and mahogany tables stocked with books and current newspapers, served as sitting rooms during the days. At mealtimes, crews transformed the cabin into a dining room. Drawing a curtain across the width of the room divided the cabin into ladies' and gentlemen's sleeping quarters at night. Pull-down tiered beds folded from the walls, and additional cots could be hung from hooks in the ceiling. Some captains hired musicians and held dances.

=== Sunday closing debate ===
In 1858, the New York State Legislature debated closing the locks of the Erie Canal on Sundays. George Jeremiah and Dwight Bacheller, two of the bill's opponents, argued that the state had no right to stop canal traffic on the grounds that the Erie Canal and its tributaries had ceased to be wards of the state. The canal at its inception had been imagined as an extension of nature, an artificial river where there had been none. The canal succeeded by sharing more in common with lakes and seas than it had with public roads. Jeremiah and Bacheller argued, successfully, that just as it was unthinkable to halt oceangoing navigation on Sunday, so it was with the canal.

== Impact ==
=== Economic impact ===
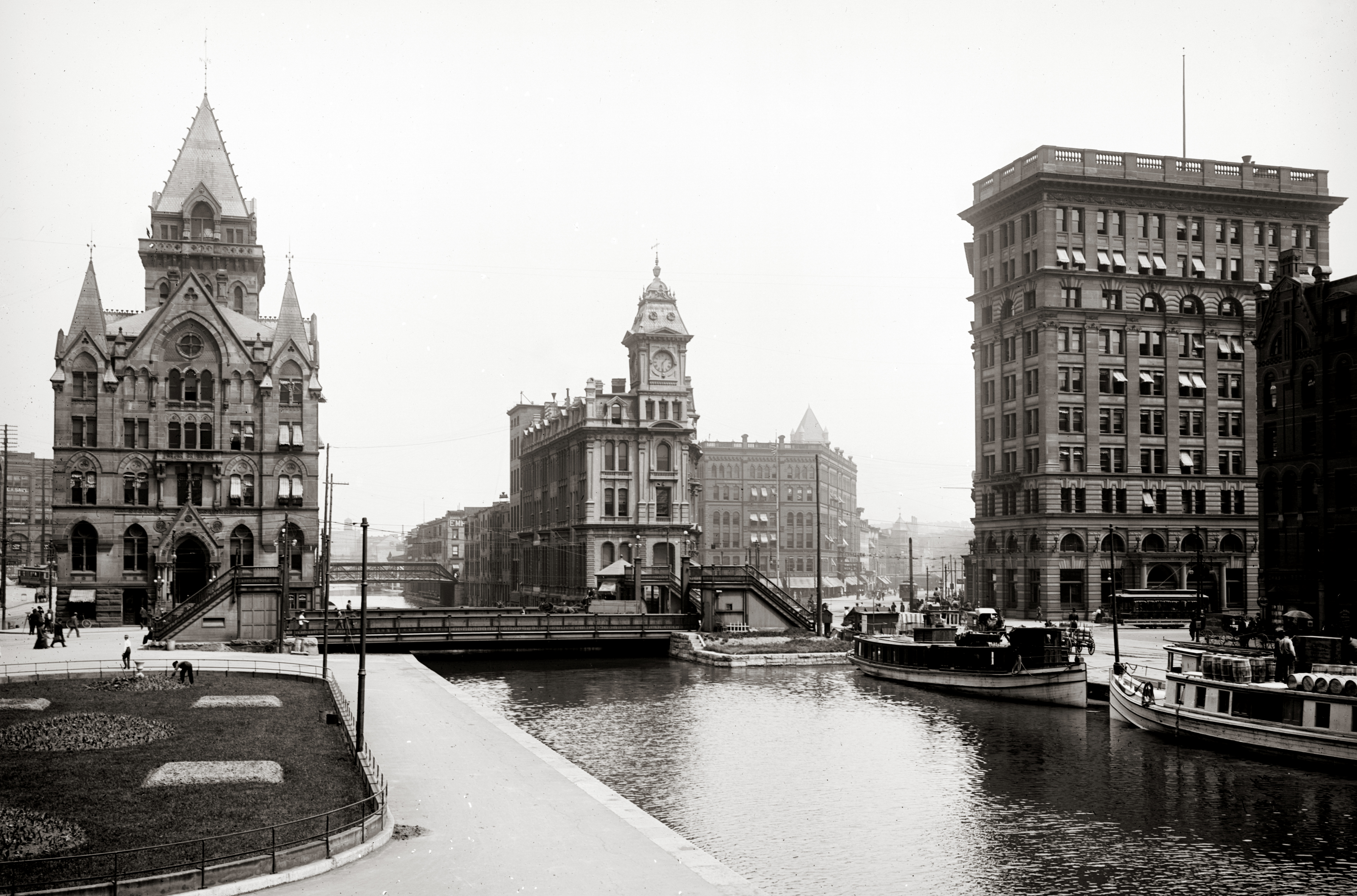
The canal at Clinton Square in Syracuse c. 1904

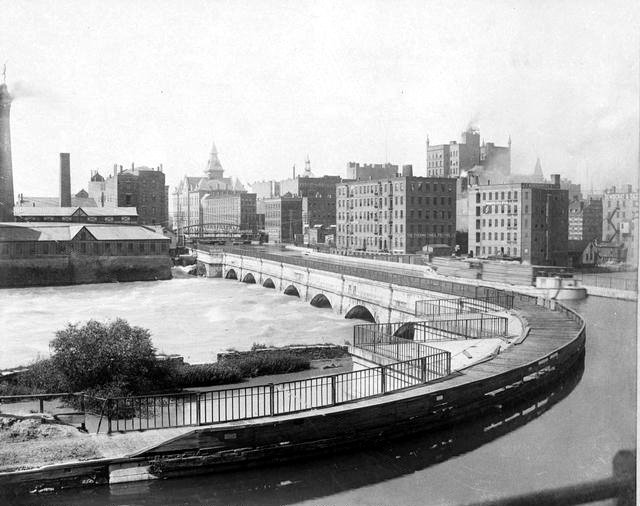
Rochester, New York, aqueduct c. 1890

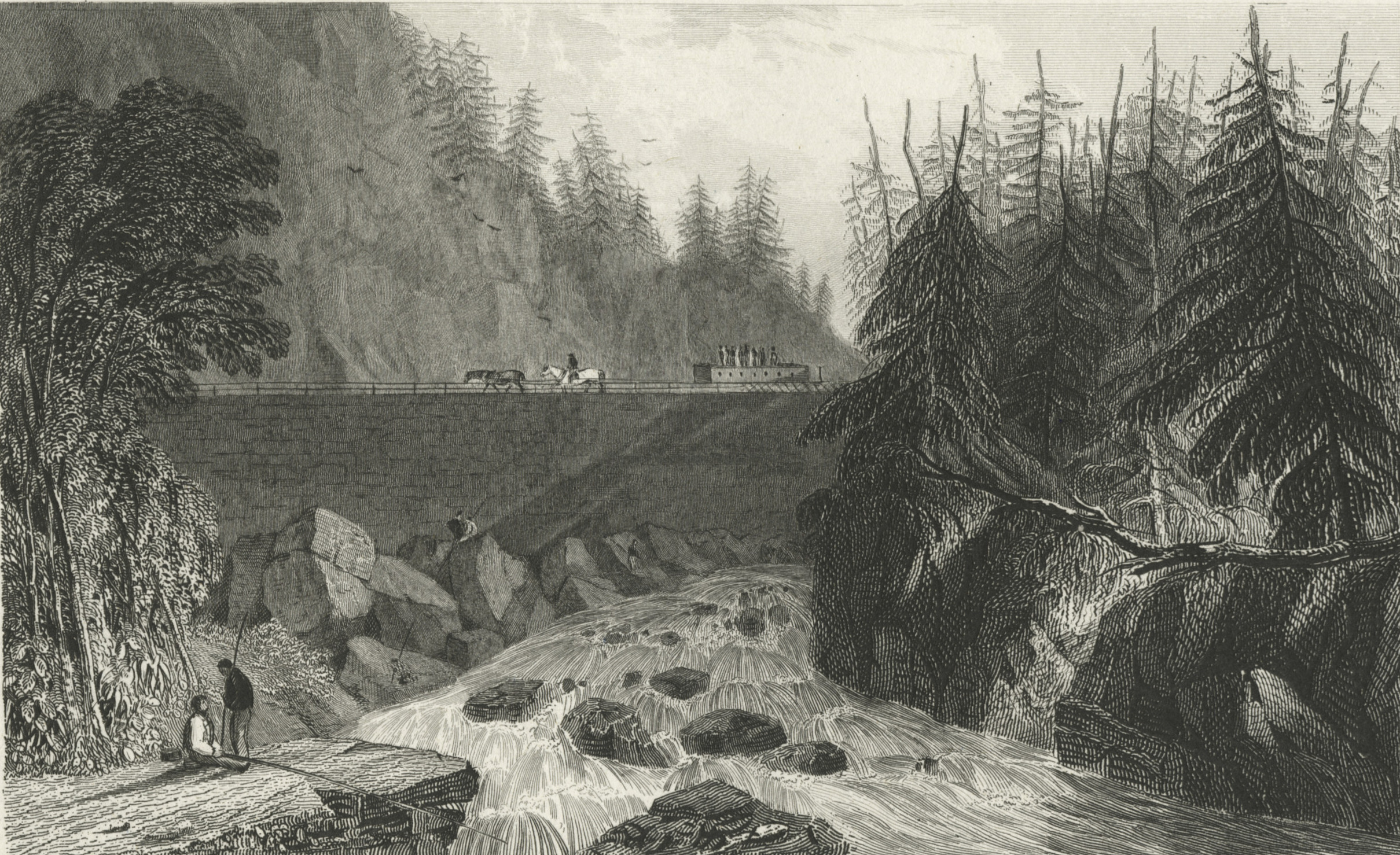
An 1850 depiction of the canal above Little Falls, a popular scenic stop

The Erie Canal greatly lowered the cost of shipping between the Midwest and the Northeast, bringing much lower food costs to Eastern cities and allowing the East to ship machinery and manufactured goods to the Midwest more economically. To give an example, the cost to transport a barrel of flour from Rochester to Albany dropped from $3 (before the canal) to 75¢ on the canal.

The canal made an immense contribution to the wealth and importance of New York City, Buffalo and New York State. Its impact went much further, increasing trade throughout the nation by opening eastern and overseas markets to Midwestern farm products and by enabling migration to the West. The port of New York became essentially the Atlantic home port for all of the Midwest. Because of this vital connection and others to follow, such as the railroads, New York would become known as the "Empire State" or "the great Empire State".

The Erie Canal was an immediate success. Tolls collected on freight had already exceeded the state's construction debt in its first year of official operation. By 1828, import duties collected at the New York Customs House supported federal government operations and provided funds for all the expenses in Washington except the interest on the national debt. New York State's initial loan for the original canal was paid by 1837.

Although it had been envisioned as primarily a commercial channel for freight boats, passengers also traveled on the canal's packet boats. In 1825 more than 40,000 passengers took advantage of the convenience and beauty of canal travel. The canal's steady flow of tourists, businessmen and settlers lent it to uses never imagined by its initial sponsors. Evangelical preachers made their circuits of the upstate region, and the canal served as the last leg of the Underground Railroad ferrying freedom seekers to Buffalo near the Canada–US border.

Many of the thousands of pioneers who left areas in New England and in New York bought supplies in Albany for their long journeys, which had an impact on the number of financial institutions needed in Albany.

Aspiring merchants found that tourists were reliable customers. Vendors moved from boat to boat peddling items such as books, watches and fruit, while less scrupulous "confidence men" sold remedies for foot corns or passed off counterfeit bills. Tourists were carried along the "northern tour," which ultimately led to the popular honeymoon destination Niagara Falls, just north of Buffalo.

As the canal brought travelers to New York City, it took business away from other ports such as Philadelphia and Baltimore. Those cities and their states started projects to compete with the Erie Canal. In Pennsylvania, the Main Line of Public Works was a combined canal and railroad running west from Philadelphia to Pittsburgh on the Ohio River, opened in 1834. In Maryland, the Baltimore and Ohio Railroad ran west to Wheeling, West Virginia, then a part of Virginia, also on the Ohio River, and was completed in 1853.

The canal played a major role in the growth of Standard Oil, as founder John D. Rockefeller used the canal as a cheaper form of transportation – in the summer months when it was not frozen – to get his refined oil from Cleveland to New York City. In the winter months his only options were the three trunk lines: the Erie Railroad, the New York Central Railroad, or the Pennsylvania Railroad.

=== Migratory impact ===
New ethnic Irish communities formed in some towns along its route after completion, as Irish immigrants were a large portion of the construction labor force. A plaque honoring the canal's construction is located in Battery Park in southern Manhattan.

Because so many immigrants traveled on the canal, many genealogists have sought copies of canal passenger lists. Apart from the years 1827–1829, canal boat operators were not required to record passenger names or report them to the New York government. Some passenger lists survive today in the New York State Archives, and other sources of traveler information are sometimes available.

The canal allowed Buffalo to grow from just 200 settlers in 1820 to more than 18,000 people by 1840. Immense population growth was seen across the Upstate NY cities that touched the Erie Canal within the first decade after the waterway's 1825 opening, including Albany, Syracuse, Rochester, and Lockport.

=== Cultural impact ===
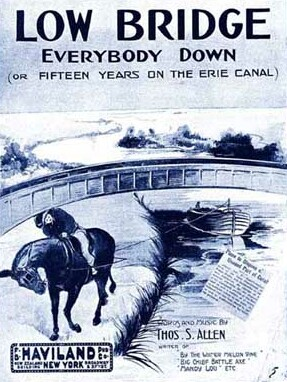
1913 sheet music cover of "Low Bridge, Everybody Down"

The Canal helped bind the still-new nation closer to Britain and Europe. Repeal of Britain's Corn Law resulted in a huge increase in exports of Midwestern wheat to Britain. Trade between the United States and Canada increased as a result of the repeal and a reciprocity (free-trade) agreement signed in 1854. Much of this trade flowed along the Erie.

Its success prompted imitation: a rash of canal-building followed. Also, the many technical hurdles that had to be overcome made heroes of those whose innovations made the canal possible. This led to an increased public esteem for practical education. Chicago, among other Great Lakes cities, recognized the importance of the canal to its economy, and two West Loop streets are named "Canal" and "Clinton", for canal proponent DeWitt Clinton.

Concern that erosion caused by logging in the Adirondacks could silt up the canal contributed to the creation in 1885 of another New York National Historic Landmark, the Adirondack Park.

Many notable authors wrote about the canal, including Herman Melville, Frances Trollope, Nathaniel Hawthorne, Harriet Beecher Stowe, Mark Twain, Samuel Hopkins Adams and the Marquis de Lafayette, and many tales and songs were written about life on the canal. The popular song "Low Bridge, Everybody Down" by Thomas S. Allen was written in 1905 to memorialize the canal's early heyday, when barges were pulled by mules rather than engines.

Consisting of a massive stone aqueduct that carried boats over incredible cascades, Little Falls was one of the most popular stops for American and foreign tourists. This is shown in Scene 4 of William Dunlap's play A Trip to Niagara, where he depicts the general preference of tourists to travel by canal so that they could experience a combination of artificial and natural sights. Canal travel was, for many, an opportunity to take in the sublime and commune with nature. The play also reflects the less enthusiastic view of some who saw movement on the canal as tedious.

The Erie Canal changed property law in New York. Most importantly, it expanded the government's right to take private property. Cases surrounding the newly built Erie Canal expanded condemnation theory to permit canal builders to appropriate private land and broadened the meaning of "public use" in the 5th Amendment to the US Constitution. The canal also had an impact on water access jurisprudence as well as nuisance law.

== The canal today ==
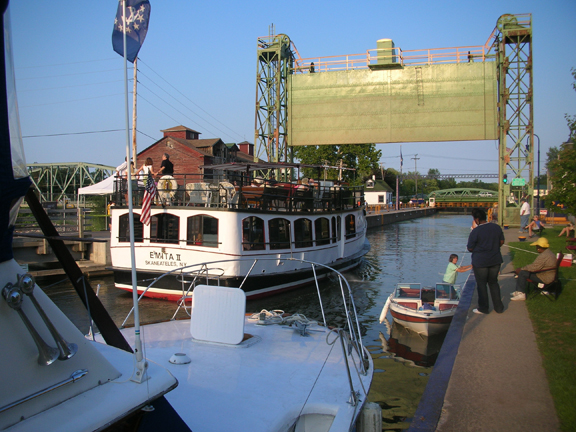
A commercial tour boat locks through Baldwinsville's Lock 24

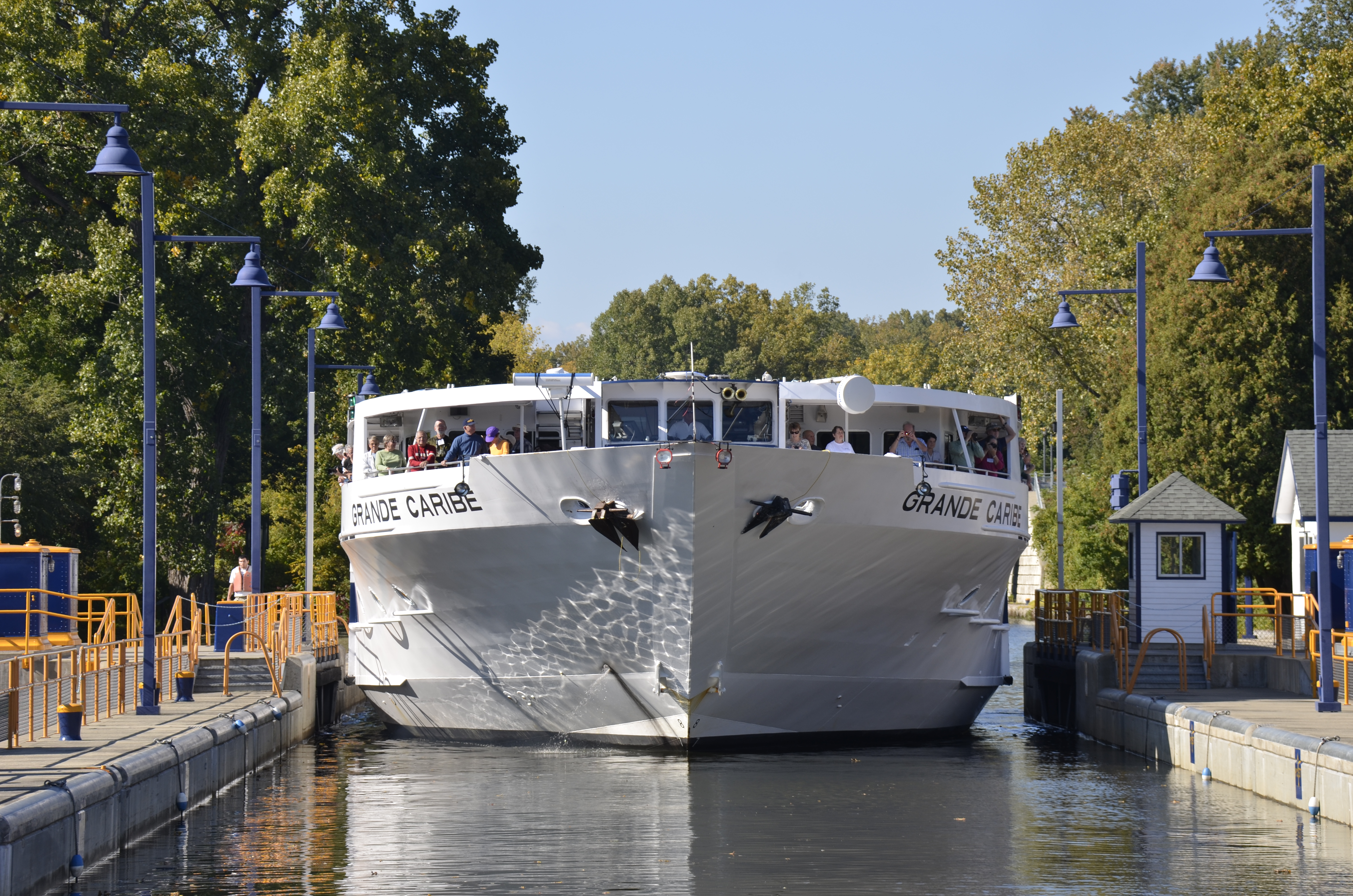
MV Grande Caribe traversing the canal on an overnight cruise in 2014

Today, the Erie Canal is used primarily by recreational vessels, though it remains served by several commercial barge-towing companies.

The canal is open to small craft and some larger vessels from May through November each year. During winter, water is drained from parts of the canal for maintenance. The Champlain Canal, Lake Champlain, and the Chambly Canal, and Richelieu River in Canada form the Lakes to Locks Passage, making a tourist attraction of the former waterway linking eastern Canada to the Erie Canal. In 2006 recreational boating fees were suspended to attract more visitors.

The Erie Canal is a destination for tourists from all over the world, and has inspired guidebooks dedicated to exploration of the waterway. An Erie Canal Cruise company, based in Herkimer, operates from mid-May until mid-October with daily cruises. The cruise goes through the history of the canal and also takes passengers through Lock 18.

Aside from transportation, numerous businesses, farms, factories and communities alongside its banks still utilize the canal's waters for other purposes such as irrigation for farmland, hydroelectricity, research, industry, and even drinking. Use of the canal system has an estimated total economic impact of $6.2 billion annually.

=== Old Erie Canal ===
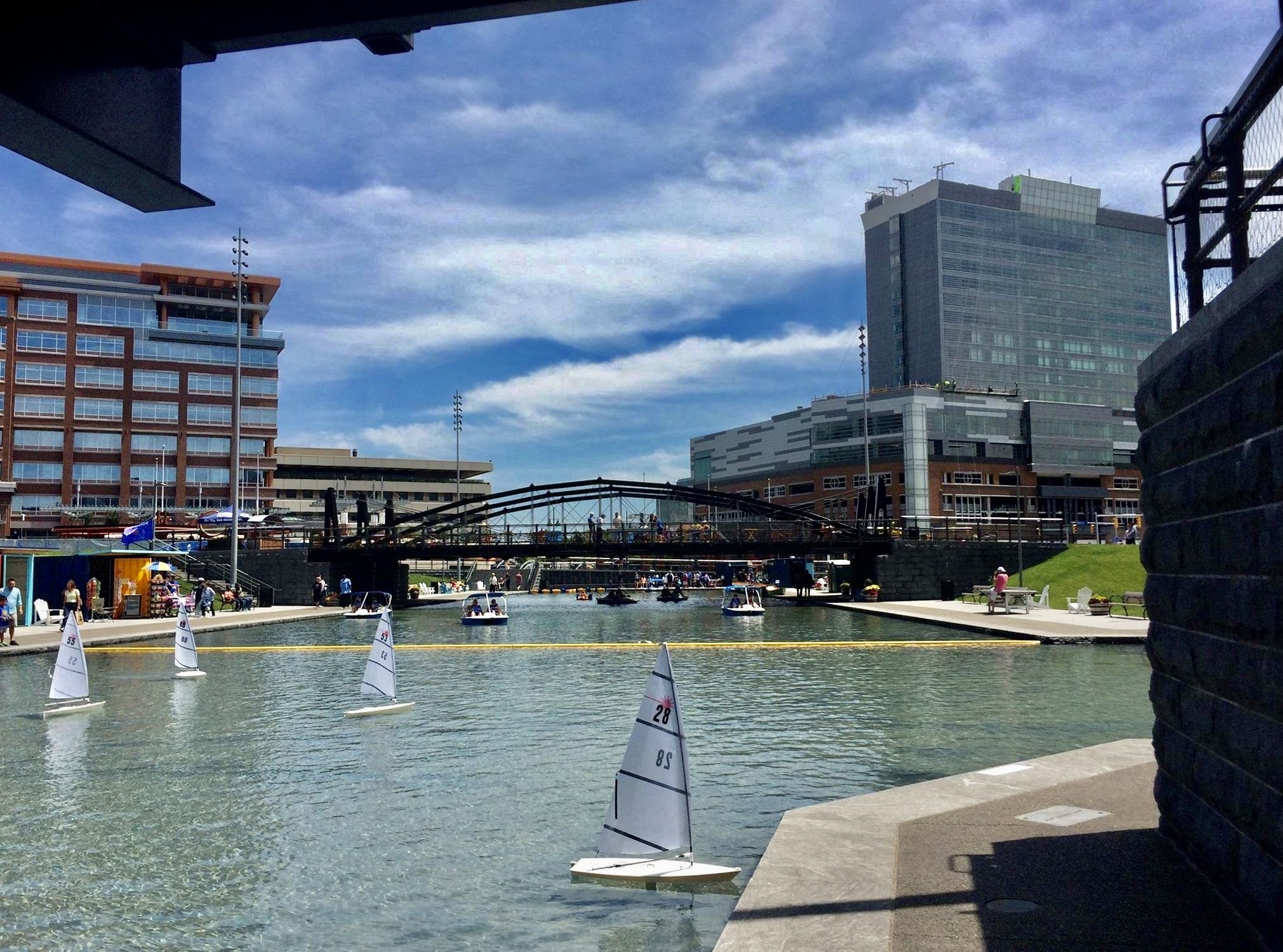
Canalside, a re-created segment of the Old Erie Canal in Buffalo

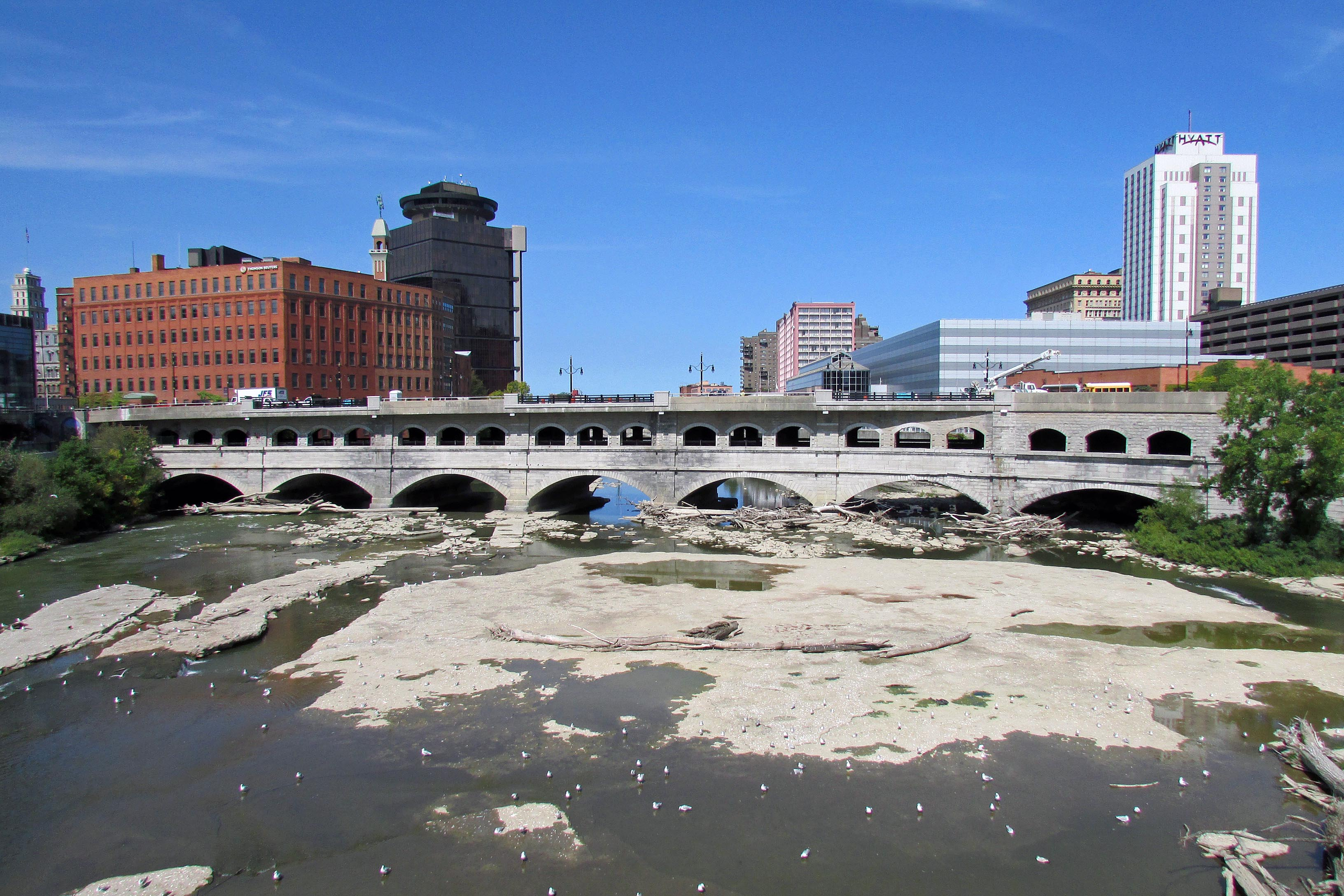
The Second Genesee Aqueduct in Rochester carried the Rochester Subway and now carries Broad Street.

Today, the reconfiguration of the canal created during the First Enlargement is commonly referred to as the "Improved Erie Canal" or the "Old Erie Canal", to distinguish it from the canal's modern-day course. Existing remains of the 1825 canal abandoned during the Enlargement are officially referred to today as "Clinton's Ditch" (which was also the popular nickname for the entire Erie Canal project during its original 1817–1825 construction).

Sections of the Old Erie Canal not used after 1918 are owned by New York State, or have been ceded to or purchased by counties or municipalities. Many stretches of the old canal have been filled in to create roads such as Erie Boulevard in Syracuse and Schenectady, and Broad Street and the Rochester Subway in Rochester. A 36‑mile (58 km) stretch of the old canal from the town of DeWitt, New York, east of Syracuse, to just outside Rome, New York, is preserved as the Old Erie Canal State Historic Park. In 1960 the Schoharie Crossing State Historic Site, a section of the canal in Montgomery County, was one of the first sites recognized as a National Historic Landmark.

Some municipalities have preserved sections as town or county canal parks, or have plans to do so. Camillus Erie Canal Park preserves a 7-mile (11 km) stretch and has restored Nine Mile Creek Aqueduct, built in 1841 as part of the First Enlargement of the canal. In some communities, the old canal has refilled with overgrowth and debris. Proposals have been made to rehydrate the old canal through downtown Rochester or Syracuse as a tourist attraction. In Syracuse, the location of the old canal is represented by a reflecting pool in downtown's Clinton Square and the downtown hosts a canal barge and weigh lock structure, now dry. Buffalo's Commercial Slip is the restored and re-watered segment of the canal which formed its "Western Terminus".

In 2004, the administration of New York Governor George Pataki was criticized when officials of New York State Canal Corporation attempted to sell private development rights to large stretches of the Old Erie Canal to a single developer for $30,000, far less than the land was worth on the open market. After an investigation by the Syracuse Post-Standard newspaper, the Pataki administration nullified the deal.

==== Parks and museums ====
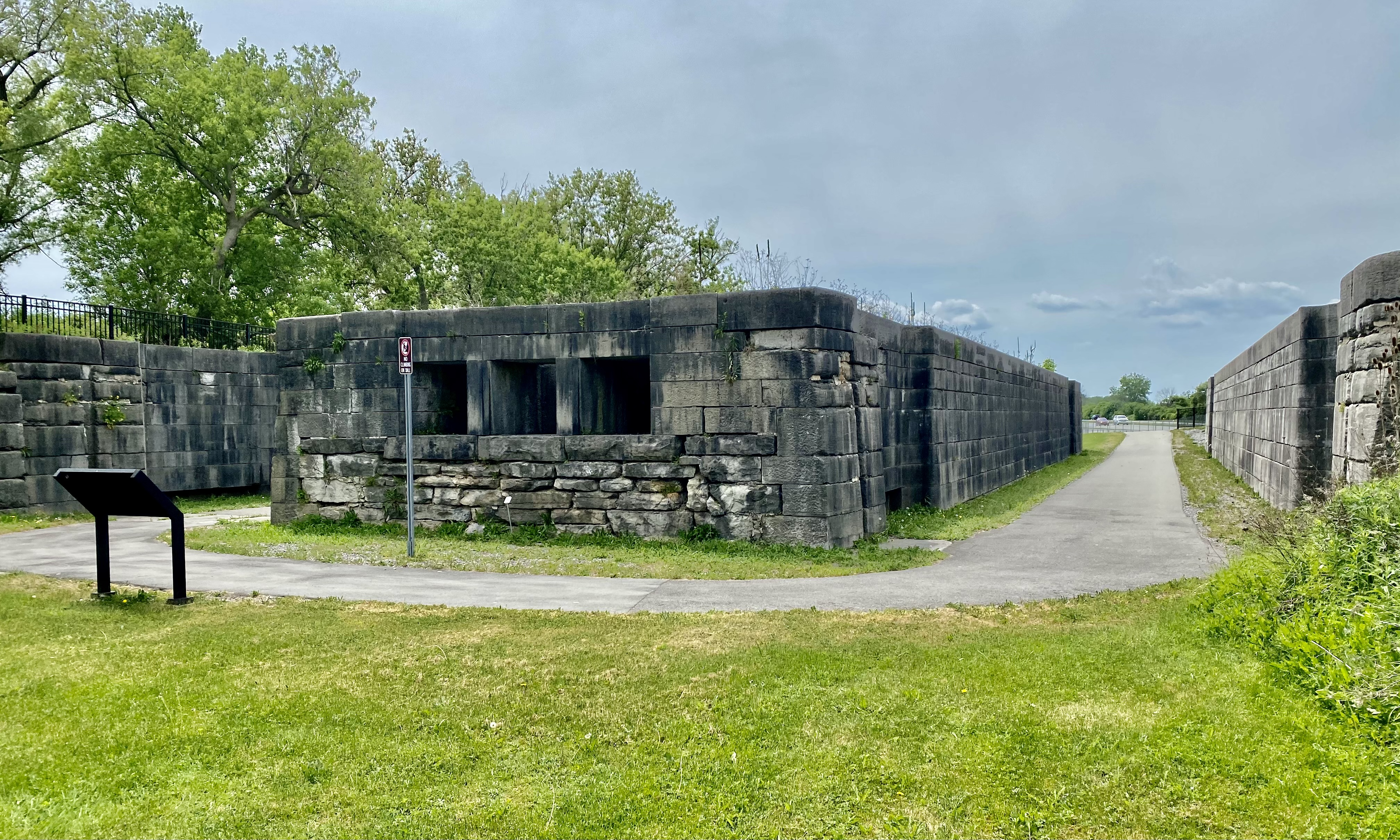
Old Erie Canal Lock 52 in Port Byron

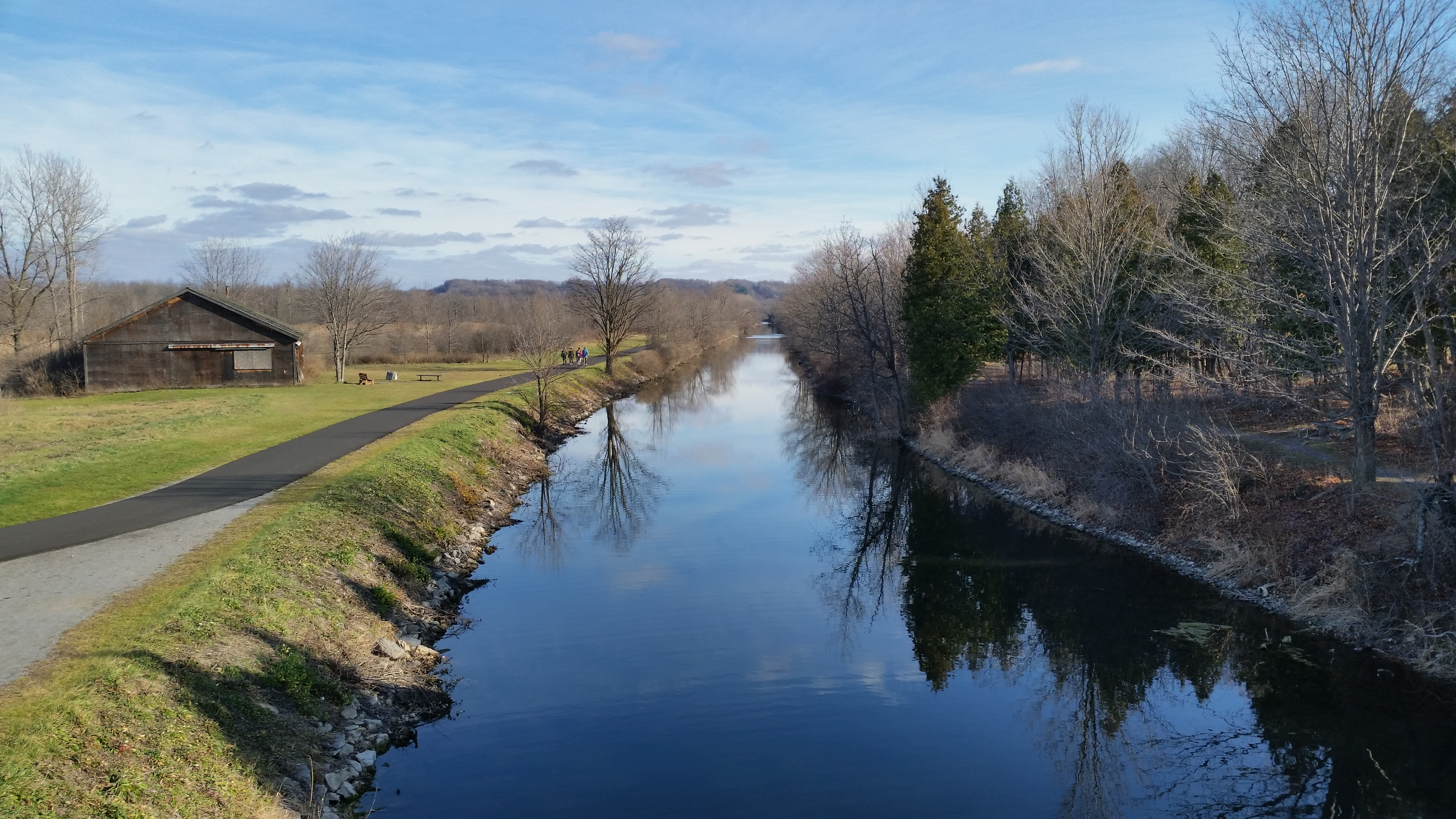
Old Erie Canal State Historic Park in DeWitt

Parks and museums related to the Old Erie Canal include (listed from east to west):

- Day Peckinpaugh ship; restoration and conversion to a floating museum was planned for completion in 2012 by the New York State Museum
- Watervliet Side Cut Locks, located at Watervliet and listed on the National Register of Historic Places in 1971
- Enlarged Erie Canal Historic District (Discontiguous), a national historic district located at Cohoes, New York listed on the National Register of Historic Places in 2004
- Cohoes Falls Park, 231 N. Mohawk St., Cohoes, New York, offers, looking away from the river, a dramatic view of abandoned and dry Erie Canal lock 18, high above.
- Enlarged Double Lock No. 23, Old Erie Canal, Rotterdam
- Schoharie Crossing State Historic Site at Fort Hunter
- Old Erie Canal State Historic Park, 36-mile linear park from Rome to DeWitt
  - Erie Canal Village, near Rome
  - Canastota Canal Town Museum, Canastota
  - Chittenango Landing Canal Boat Museum, near Chittenango
- Erie Canal Museum in downtown Syracuse
- Camillus Erie Canal Park in Camillus
- Jordan Canal Park in Jordan, town of Elbridge
- Enlarged Double Lock No. 33 Old Erie Canal, St. Johnsville
- Erie Canal Lock 52 Complex, a national historic district located within the Old Erie Canal Heritage Park at Port Byron and Mentz in Cayuga County; listed on the National Register of Historic Places in 1998
- Seneca River Crossing Canals Historic District, a national historic district located at Montezuma and Tyre in Cayuga County; listed on the National Register of Historic Places in 2005
- Centerport Aqueduct Park near Weedsport; listed on the National Register of Historic Places in 2000
- Lock Berlin Park near Clyde
- Macedon Aqueduct Park near Palmyra
- Old Erie Canal Lock 60 Park in Macedon
- Perinton Park in Perinton near Fairport
- Genesee Valley Park in the city of Rochester
- Spencerport Depot & Canal Museum, Spencerport
- Niagara Escarpment "Flight of Five" locks at Lockport
- Erie Canal Discovery Center, 24 Church Street, Lockport (Locks 34 and 35)
- Canalside Buffalo at the Canal's "Western Terminus"

=== Records and research ===
Records of the planning, funding, design, construction, and administration of the Erie Canal are vast and can be found in the New York State Archives. Except for two years (1827–1829), the State of New York did not require canal boat operators to maintain or submit passenger lists.

== Locks ==
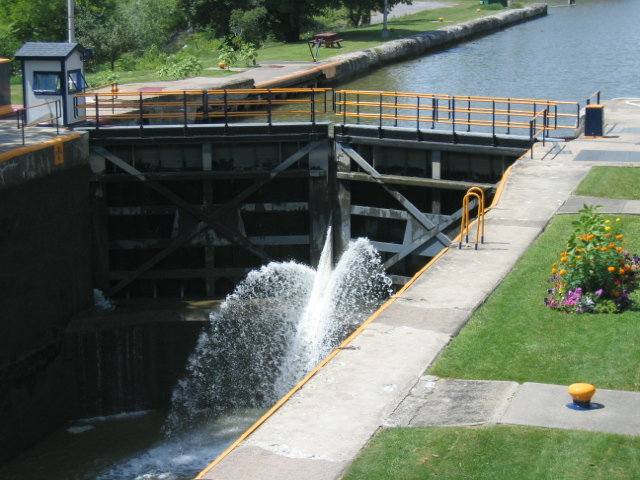
An upstream view of the downstream lock at Lock 32, Pittsford, New York

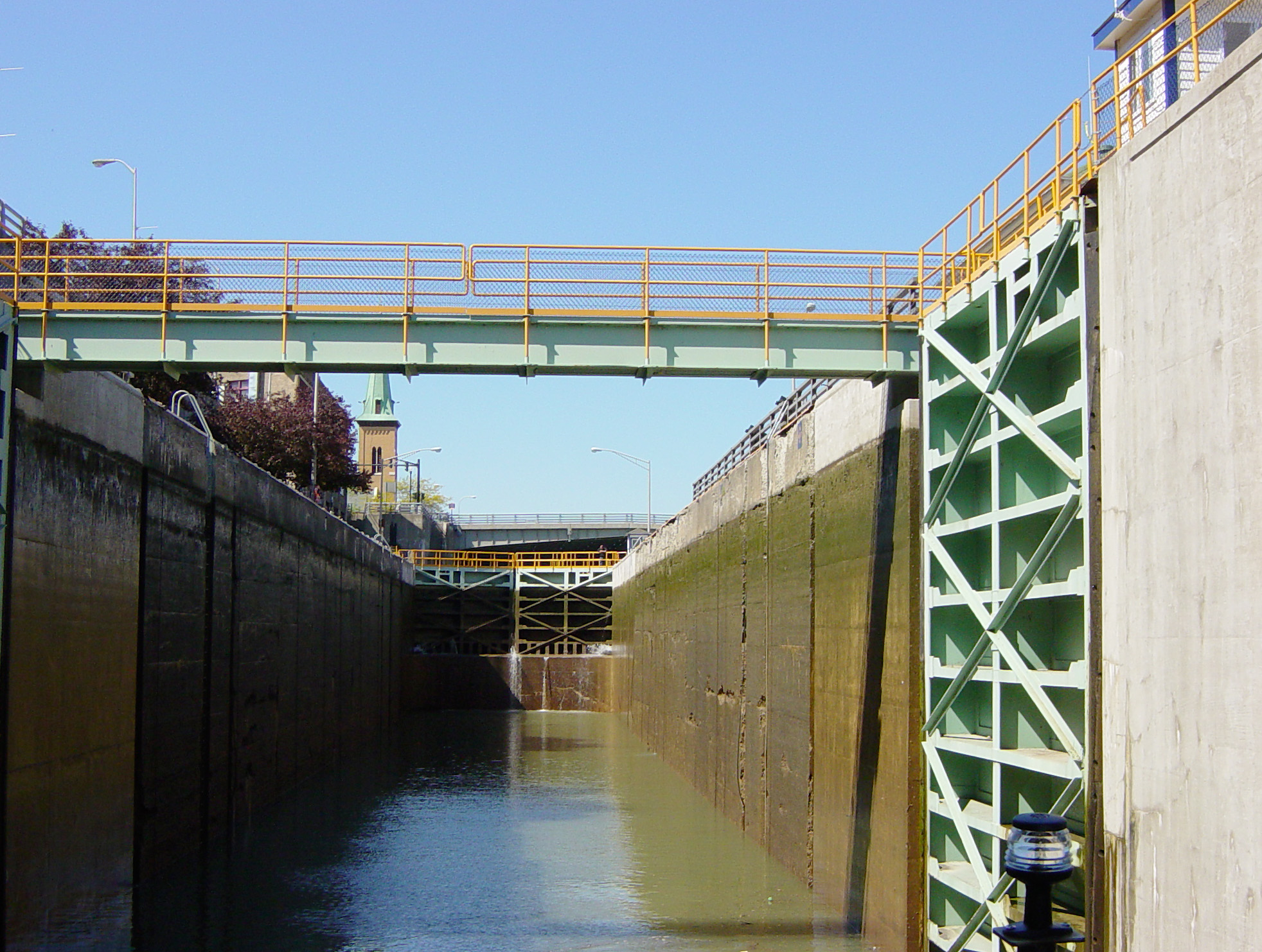
The modern single lock at the Niagara Escarpment

The following list of locks is provided for the current canal, from east to west. There are a total of 36 (35 numbered) locks on the Erie Canal.

All locks on the New York State Canal System are single-chamber; the dimensions are 328 feet (100 m) long and 45 feet (14 m) wide with a minimum 12-foot (3.7 m) depth of water over the miter sills at the upstream gates upon lift. They can accommodate a vessel up to 300 feet (91 m) long and 43.5 feet (13.3 m) wide. Overall sidewall height will vary by lock, ranging between 28 and 61 feet (8.5 and 18.6 m) depending on the lift and navigable stages. Lock E17 at Little Falls has the tallest sidewall height at 80 feet (24 m).

Distance is based on position markers from an interactive canal map provided online by the New York State Canal Corporation and may not exactly match specifications on signs posted along the canal. Mean surface elevations are comprised from a combination of older canal profiles and history books as well as specifications on signs posted along the canal. The margin of error should normally be within 6 inches (15 cm).

The Waterford Flight series of locks (comprising Locks E2 through E6) is one of the steepest in the world, lifting boats 169 feet (52 m) in less than 2 miles (3.2 km).

All surface elevations are approximate.

Lock No.	Location	Elevation (upstream/west)	Elevation (downstream/east)	Lift or Drop	Distance to Next Lock (upstream/west)	HAER No.
Troy Federal Lock *	Troy	15.3 ft (4.7 m)	1.3 ft (0.40 m)	14.0 ft (4.3 m)	E2, 2.66 mi (4.28 km)	
E2	Waterford	48.9 ft (14.9 m)	15.3 ft (4.7 m)	33.6 ft (10.2 m)	E3, 0.46 mi (0.74 km)	NY-371
E3	Waterford	83.5 ft (25.5 m)	48.9 ft (14.9 m)	34.6 ft (10.5 m)	E4, 0.51 mi (0.82 km)	NY-372
E4	Waterford	118.1 ft (36.0 m)	83.5 ft (25.5 m)	34.6 ft (10.5 m)	E5, 0.27 mi (0.43 km)	NY-375
E5	Waterford	151.4 ft (46.1 m)	118.1 ft (36.0 m)	33.3 ft (10.1 m)	E6, 0.28 mi (0.45 km)	NY-376
E6	Crescent	184.4 ft (56.2 m)	151.4 ft (46.1 m)	33.0 ft (10.1 m)	E7, 10.92 mi (17.57 km)	NY-377
E7	Vischer Ferry	211.4 ft (64.4 m)	184.4 ft (56.2 m)	27.0 ft (8.2 m)	E8, 10.97 mi (17.65 km)	NY-387
E8	Scotia	225.4 ft (68.7 m)	211.4 ft (64.4 m)	14.0 ft (4.3 m)	E9, 5.03 mi (8.10 km)	NY-383
E9	Rotterdam	240.4 ft (73.3 m)	225.4 ft (68.7 m)	15.0 ft (4.6 m)	E10, 5.95 mi (9.58 km)	NY-385
E10	Cranesville	255.4 ft (77.8 m)	240.4 ft (73.3 m)	15.0 ft (4.6 m)	E11, 4.27 mi (6.87 km)	NY-386
E11	Amsterdam	267.4 ft (81.5 m)	255.4 ft (77.8 m)	12.0 ft (3.7 m)	E12, 4.23 mi (6.81 km)	NY-388
E12	Tribes Hill	278.4 ft (84.9 m)	267.4 ft (81.5 m)	11.0 ft (3.4 m)	E13, 9.60 mi (15.45 km)	NY-389
E13	Yosts	286.4 ft (87.3 m)	278.4 ft (84.9 m)	8.0 ft (2.4 m)	E14, 7.83 mi (12.60 km)	NY-391
E14	Canajoharie	294.4 ft (89.7 m)	286.4 ft (87.3 m)	8.0 ft (2.4 m)	E15, 3.35 mi (5.39 km)	NY-393
E15	Fort Plain	302.4 ft (92.2 m)	294.4 ft (89.7 m)	8.0 ft (2.4 m)	E16, 6.72 mi (10.81 km)	NY-394
E16	St. Johnsville	322.9 ft (98.4 m)	302.4 ft (92.2 m)	20.5 ft (6.2 m)	E17, 7.97 mi (12.83 km)	NY-396
E17	Little Falls	363.4 ft (110.8 m)	322.9 ft (98.4 m)	40.5 ft (12.3 m)	E18, 4.20 mi (6.76 km)	NY-399
E18	Jacksonburg	383.4 ft (116.9 m)	363.4 ft (110.8 m)	20.0 ft (6.1 m)	E19, 11.85 mi (19.07 km)	NY-402
E19	Frankfort	404.4 ft (123.3 m)	383.4 ft (116.9 m)	21.0 ft (6.4 m)	E20, 10.28 mi (16.54 km)	NY-407
E20	Whitesboro	420.4 ft (128.1 m)	404.4 ft (123.3 m)	16.0 ft (4.9 m)	E21, 18.10 mi (29.13 km)	NY-412
E21	New London	395.4 ft (120.5 m)	420.4 ft (128.1 m)	−25.0 ft (−7.6 m)	E22, 1.32 mi (2.12 km)	NY-421
E22	New London	370.1 ft (112.8 m)	395.4 ft (120.5 m)	−25.3 ft (−7.7 m)	E23, 28.91 mi (46.53 km)	NY-422
E23	Brewerton	363.0 ft (110.6 m)	370.1 ft (112.8 m)	−7.1 ft (−2.2 m)	E24, 18.77 mi (30.21 km)	NY-427
E24	Baldwinsville	374.0 ft (114.0 m)	363.0 ft (110.6 m)	11.0 ft (3.4 m)	E25, 30.69 mi (49.39 km)	NY-433
E25	Mays Point	380.0 ft (115.8 m)	374.0 ft (114.0 m)	6.0 ft (1.8 m)	E26, 5.83 mi (9.38 km)	NY-437
E26	Clyde	386.0 ft (117.7 m)	380.0 ft (115.8 m)	6.0 ft (1.8 m)	E27, 12.05 mi (19.39 km)	NY-438
E27	Lyons	398.5 ft (121.5 m)	386.0 ft (117.7 m)	12.5 ft (3.8 m)	E28A, 1.28 mi (2.06 km)	NY-440
E28A	Lyons	418.0 ft (127.4 m)	398.5 ft (121.5 m)	19.5 ft (5.9 m)	E28B, 3.98 mi (6.41 km)	NY-441
E28B	Newark	430.0 ft (131.1 m)	418.0 ft (127.4 m)	12.0 ft (3.7 m)	E29, 9.79 mi (15.76 km)	NY-445
E29	Palmyra	446.0 ft (135.9 m)	430.0 ft (131.1 m)	16.0 ft (4.9 m)	E30, 2.98 mi (4.80 km)	NY-452
E30	Macedon	462.4 ft (140.9 m)	446.0 ft (135.9 m)	16.4 ft (5.0 m)	E32, 16.12 mi (25.94 km)	NY-454
E32	Pittsford	487.5 ft (148.6 m)	462.4 ft (140.9 m)	25.1 ft (7.7 m)	E33, 1.26 mi (2.03 km)	NY-462
E33	Rochester	512.9 ft (156.3 m)	487.5 ft (148.6 m)	25.4 ft (7.7 m)	E34/35, 64.28 mi (103.45 km)	NY-463
E34	Lockport	539.5 ft (164.4 m)	514.9 ft (156.9 m)	24.6 ft (7.5 m)	E35, adjacent to Lock E34.	NY-515
E35	Lockport	564.0 ft (171.9 m)	539.5 ft (164.4 m)	24.5 ft (7.5 m)	Black Rock Lock in Niagara River, 26.39 mi (42.47 km)	NY-516
Black Rock Lock *	Buffalo	570.6 ft (173.9 m)	565.6 ft (172.4 m)	5.0 ft (1.5 m)	Commercial Slip at Buffalo River, 3.89 mi (6.26 km)	

* Denotes federally managed locks.

There is a 2-foot (0.61 m) natural rise between locks E33 and E34 as well as a 1.5-foot (0.46 m) natural rise between Lock E35 and the Niagara River.

There is no Lock E1 or Lock E31 on the Erie Canal. The place of "Lock E1" on the passage from the lower Hudson River to Lake Erie is taken by the Troy Federal Lock, located just north of Troy, New York, and is not part of the Erie Canal System proper. It is operated by the United States Army Corps of Engineers. The Erie Canal officially begins at the confluence of the Hudson and Mohawk rivers at Waterford, New York.

Although the original alignment of the Erie Canal through Buffalo has been filled in, travel by water is still possible from Buffalo via the Black Rock Lock in the Niagara River to the canal's modern western terminus in Tonawanda, and eastward to Albany. The Black Rock Lock is operated by the United States Army Corps of Engineers.

Oneida Lake lies between locks E22 and E23, and has a mean surface elevation of 370 feet (110 m). Lake Erie has a mean surface elevation of 571 feet (174 m).

== See also ==
- Robert C. Dorn
- List of canals in New York
- List of canals in the United States
- "Low Bridge", a song written by Thomas S. Allen, also known as "The Erie Canal Song"
- John C. Mather (New York politician)
- Ohio and Erie Canal, connecting Lake Erie with the Ohio River
- Welland Canal, opened in 1829, bypasses the Niagara River between Lake Erie and Lake Ontario
