= Enlarged Double Lock No. 33 Old Erie Canal =

Part of the historic Erie Canal in the US

- U.S. National Register of Historic Places
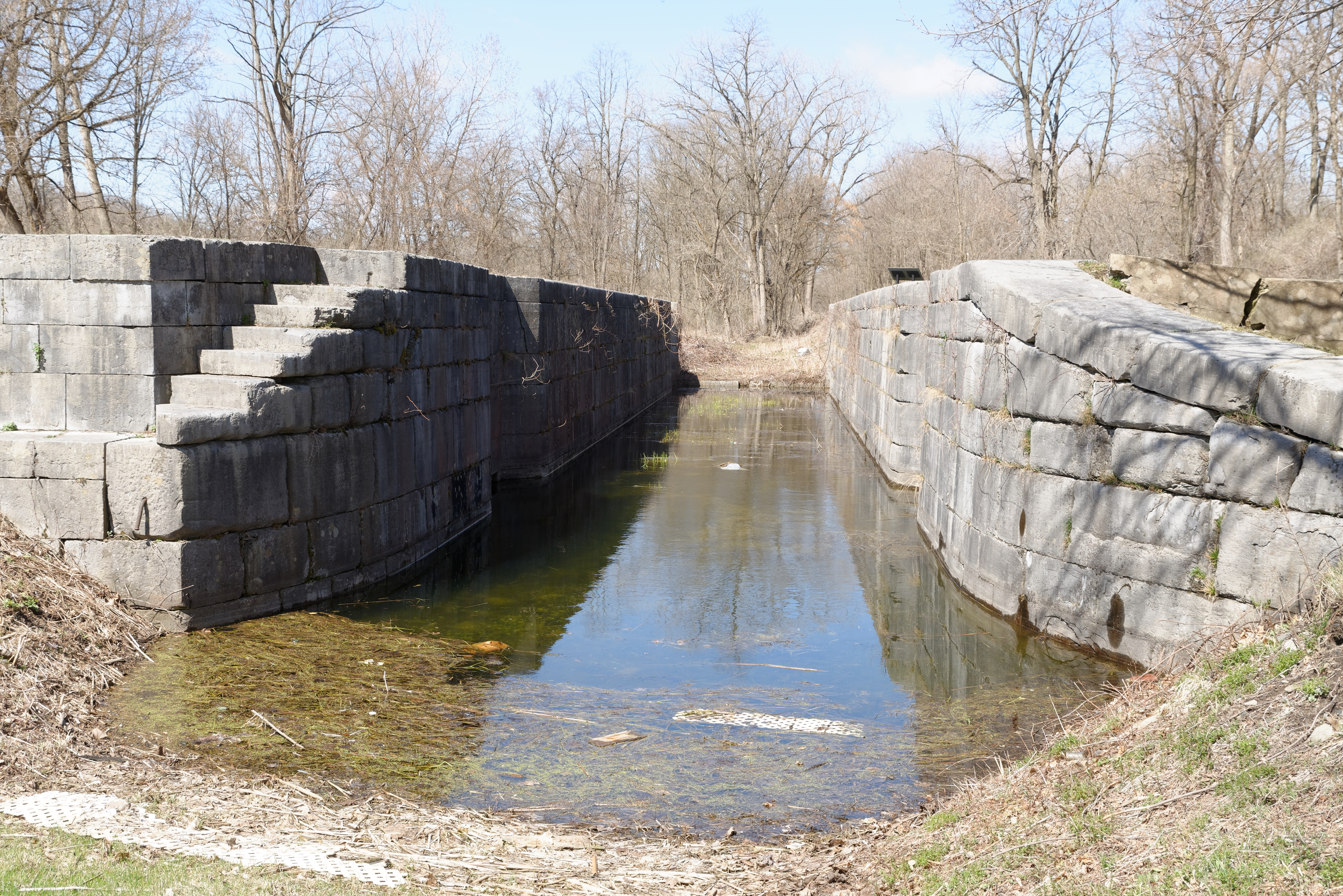

- Location within New York Location within the United States
- Location: Towpath Rd., St. Johnsville, New York
- Coordinates: 42°59′26″N 74°40′2″W
- Area: 4.3 acres (1.7 ha)
- Built: 1824
- NRHP reference No.: 02000315
- Added to NRHP: April 1, 2002

Enlarged Double Lock No. 33 Old Erie Canal is a historic Erie Canal lock located at St. Johnsville in Montgomery County, New York. It was built in 1824 and enlarged in 1840. The south lock was enlarged in 1888. It is built entirely of large cut limestone blocks mortared with hydraulic cement. Lock 33 fell into disuse after the opening of the New York State Barge Canal in 1918. Since 1997, it has been reclaimed and restored by local volunteers.

It was added to the National Register of Historic Places in 2002.
