= Dave Ruch =

Dave Ruch (born November 8, 1964) is an American performer and teaching artist working with K-12 students and multi-generational audiences across much of the United States, Canada and the United Kingdom. Ruch specializes in educational programming, performing over two hundred concerts, lectures, workshops and distance learning programs each year.

== Biography ==
Ruch began playing guitar in 1980. After playing semi-professionally in Buffalo NY and Washington DC from 1982-1992, Ruch became a full-time musician in November 1992, initially teaching music and performing regionally from his home base in Buffalo. He also performed nationally during this period with musicians such as David Gans, Virginia and the Blue Dots, and members of the band moe.

Ruch began his arts-in-education career in 1995, developing curriculum-based music programs for K-12 students around social studies content areas. He continues to work in sixty to seventy schools each year as a performer and teaching artist.

In 2014, Ruch developed a series of virtual field trips and online cultural arts programs for the school market.

Ruch has dozens of recording sessions with older “heritage” musicians. He was appointed to the New York Council for the Humanities’ “Speakers in the Humanities” program in 2006 and stayed on through the program’s demise in 2015, and is currently a "Public Scholar" with that organization He was project director for the Traditional Arts in Upstate New York (TAUNY) award-winning “W is for the Woods: Traditional Adirondack Music and Music Making” website in 2009, and music director and concert host, producer and musician for TAUNY’s 2013 “Songs to Keep” project. Ruch was featured in the nationally syndicated 2014 “Songs to Keep” documentary from Mountain Lake PBS, which went on to win a New England Emmy Award., and in 2017 was featured in the CBS News Sunday Morning cover story on the bicentennial of the Erie Canal

Ruch founded The Canal Street String Band in 2010 in Buffalo NY. The group was named to the New York State Presenters Network artist roster in 2014-15, receiving funding for six residency projects across the state.

== Discography ==
2015 “Wah Hoo!” - The Canal Street String Band

2013 “Songs to Keep – The Adirondack North Country Recordings Reimagined” - Various Artists (Producer and Performer)

2011 “Introducing the Canal Street String Band” - The Canal Street String Band

2008 “The Oldest Was Born First” - Dave Ruch

2004 “Good Time Music 2” - The Hill Brothers

2003 “Season of Light” - The Hill Brothers

2002 “The 3 R’s” - The Hill Brothers

1999 “Soft Swing Duets” - The String Brothers

1998 “Good Time Music” - The Hill Brothers
