= Seneca Chief =

First boat on Erie Canal

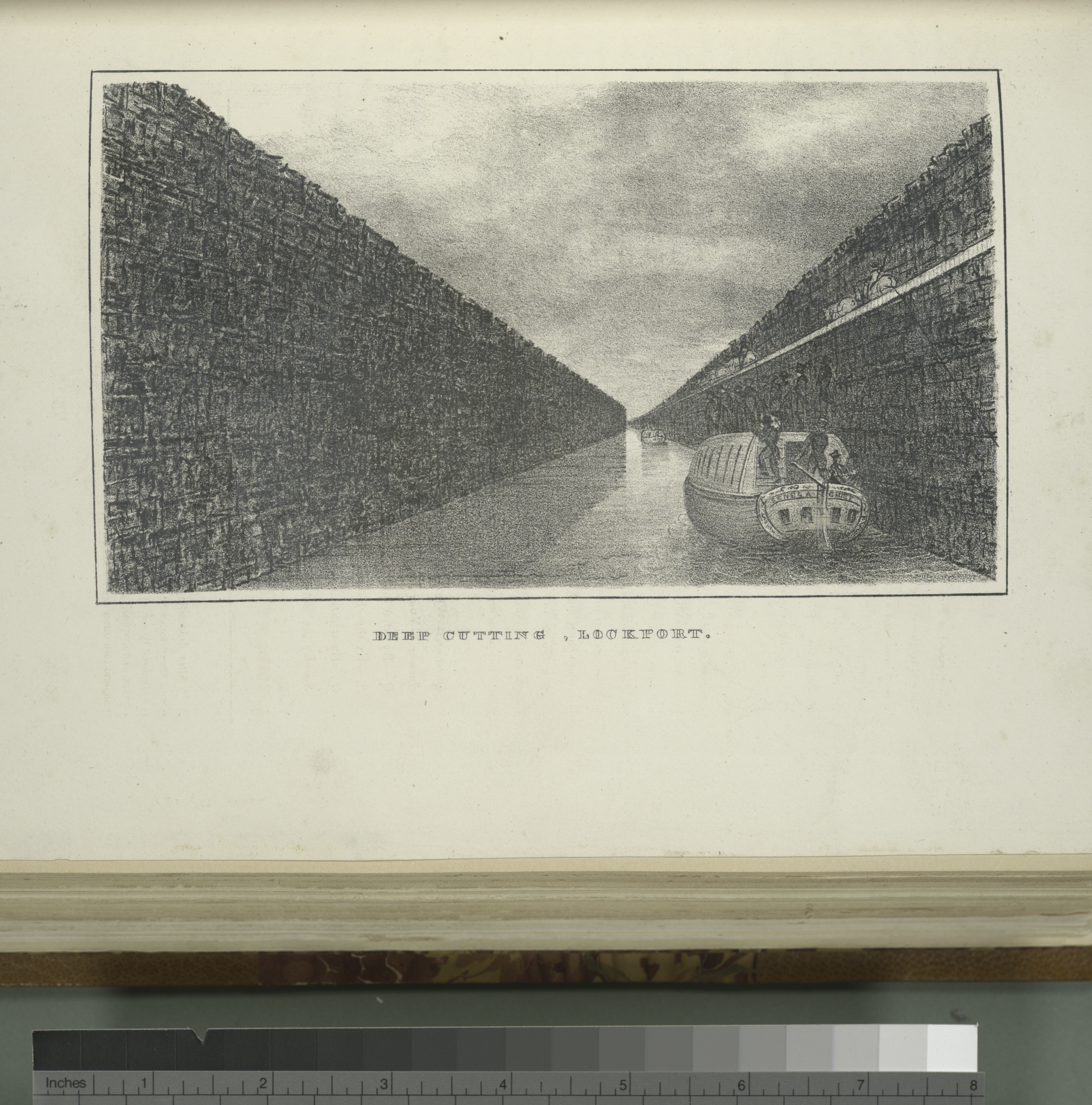
Lithograph of Erie Canal Boat Seneca Chief traveling through the Deep Cut in Lockport, NY

The Seneca Chief was the first boat to travel through the completed Erie Canal. It carried Governor Dewitt Clinton from Lake Erie, through the Erie Canal, to the Wedding of the Waters Ceremony to celebrate the opening of the waterway in 1825. The original Seneca Chief was owned by Thaddeus Joy and other partners, all of whom were likely freight-forwarders in western New York. It was a line boat, meaning it was designed to carry both passengers and cargo. The building of the boat was commissioned in 1824 and likely was constructed in either Buffalo or Black Rock, New York.

== Original Seneca Chief ==
Beginning on October 26, 1825, the Seneca Chief journeyed from Lake Erie, through the entire length of the Erie Canal, and down the Hudson River, finally reaching Sandy Hook where the final ceremony, the Wedding of the Waters, took place. The Seneca Chief traveled as part of a flotilla of boats. It left from Lake Erie with boats including the Chief, Superior, Commodore Perry, and Buffalo.

On this inaugural voyage through the newly opened Erie Canal, the Seneca Chief carried passengers Governor Dewitt Clinton, often called the "Father of the Erie Canal", and Jesse Hawley, a failed flour merchant in Upstate New York who penned essays in 1807 and 1808 advocating for the construction of a canal linking the Great Lakes with the Mohawk and Hudson Rivers to move goods to market.

As the Seneca Chief and the flotilla of boats entered the Canal, the Grand Salute marked the opening of the canal with the sound of cannon fire. Cannons were lined up all along the entire route of the Erie Canal, down the Hudson River, and stretching to Sandy Hook, each spaced 10 to 15 miles apart. The first cannon fired in Buffalo at 10:00 a.m., and was followed by the firing of a cannon in Tonawanda as soon as the sound of the first cannon reached the Tonawanda gunners. The pattern continued with sound of cannon fire traveling from cannon to cannon, reaching Sandy Hook, then rebounding in reverse order.

As this group of boats journeyed along the Erie, they were joined by boats along the way including the Niagara, Young Lion of the West, and Noah's Ark. For most of the Seneca Chief's travels through the canal, it was received joyfully with banquets, speeches, fireworks, and other celebrations. In Weedsport, the flotilla was greeted by cannon fire, which misfired, killing two gunners and abruptly ending any celebrations. In both Rome and Schenectady, the flotilla was met with gatherings of mourners who saw the Erie Canal as taking traffic and business away from their already established downtowns.

The flotilla arrived in New York City on November 4, 1825, after the boats were towed by steamboats down the Hudson River. Huge celebrations occurred through the city that day, including cannon salutes and a boat parade with additional vessels joining the original flotilla. Soon after, the famous Wedding of the Waters ceremony took place off of Sandy Hook, during which Clinton poured a keg of water obtained from Lake Erie, brought with him through the Erie Canal, into the New York Harbor and the Atlantic Ocean, symbolizing the joining of the bodies of water.

After the Wedding of the Waters ceremony, the Seneca Chief returned to Buffalo. The boat appears to have been used for carrying freight in 1826 and 1827, moving cargo including flour, furniture, wheat, ashes, etc. In 1829, it was listed as part of a freight line, carrying both passengers and merchandise.

In 1887, another boat bearing the same name was built by the Canandaigua Lake Steamboat Company—this one a steam yacht 50 feet long and with a steel hull. After nine years of service, it was intentionally sunk in Canandaigua Lake, where it was rediscovered in 2014. The two boats named Seneca Chief are not to be confused with each other.

== 2025 replica ==
For the bicentennial of the Erie Canal's 1825 completion, the Buffalo Maritime Center has created a replica of the Seneca Chief. The boat was launched in Buffalo's Canalside in 2024. In August 2024, the boat traveled from Buffalo to Rochester, NY, through the Erie Canal for a test run, welcoming visitors onto the recreated Seneca Chief at various stops along their trial trip. The Buffalo Maritime Center recreated the original Seneca Chief's journey in September and October 2025, traveling between Buffalo and New York City.

The Buffalo Maritime Center refers to the boat as the Erie Canal Boat Seneca Chief to differentiate between the boat and any leadership of the Seneca Nation of New York, although there is still ambiguity about the reasoning for the original boat's name.

== See also ==
- Erie Canal
- New York State Canal System
