= Stump harvesting =

In plantation forests in parts of Europe, the tree stumps left after felling are now sometimes pulled out of the ground to supply wood fuel for biomass power stations. The stump is the base of the trunk and the attached woody roots. Tree stumps and roots are extracted using a hydraulic head on a tracked excavator or with a mechanical head equipped by a special tool for tractors. Stump harvesting is expected to provide an increasing component of the woody material required by the woody biomass power sector in Europe.

During the 20th century in the United States longleaf pine stumps were harvested for extraction of naval stores from the resinous wood.

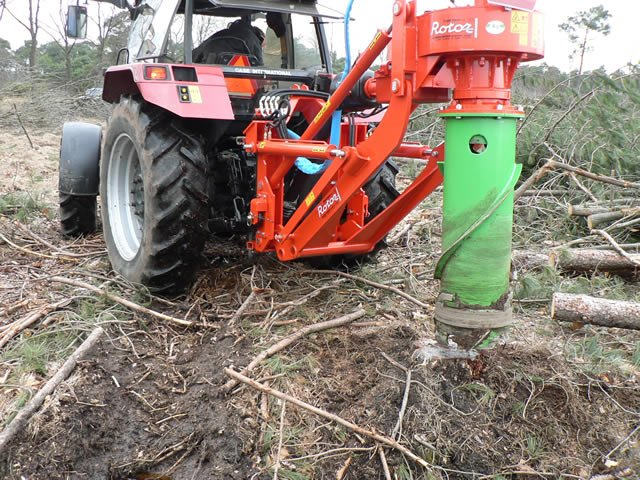
A vertical stump grinder in use.

== Sustainability ==
Stump harvesting is unsuitable on many soils where the removal leads to long term reduction in nutrition or an unacceptable loss of soil carbon. Also, it is necessary that care is taken to avoid areas with archaeology, ecologically sensitive areas, steep slopes, and areas close to streams and rivers. In many situations removal of stumps leads to a further loss of wood with a resulting loss of the potential biodiversity that depends on wood.

== History ==
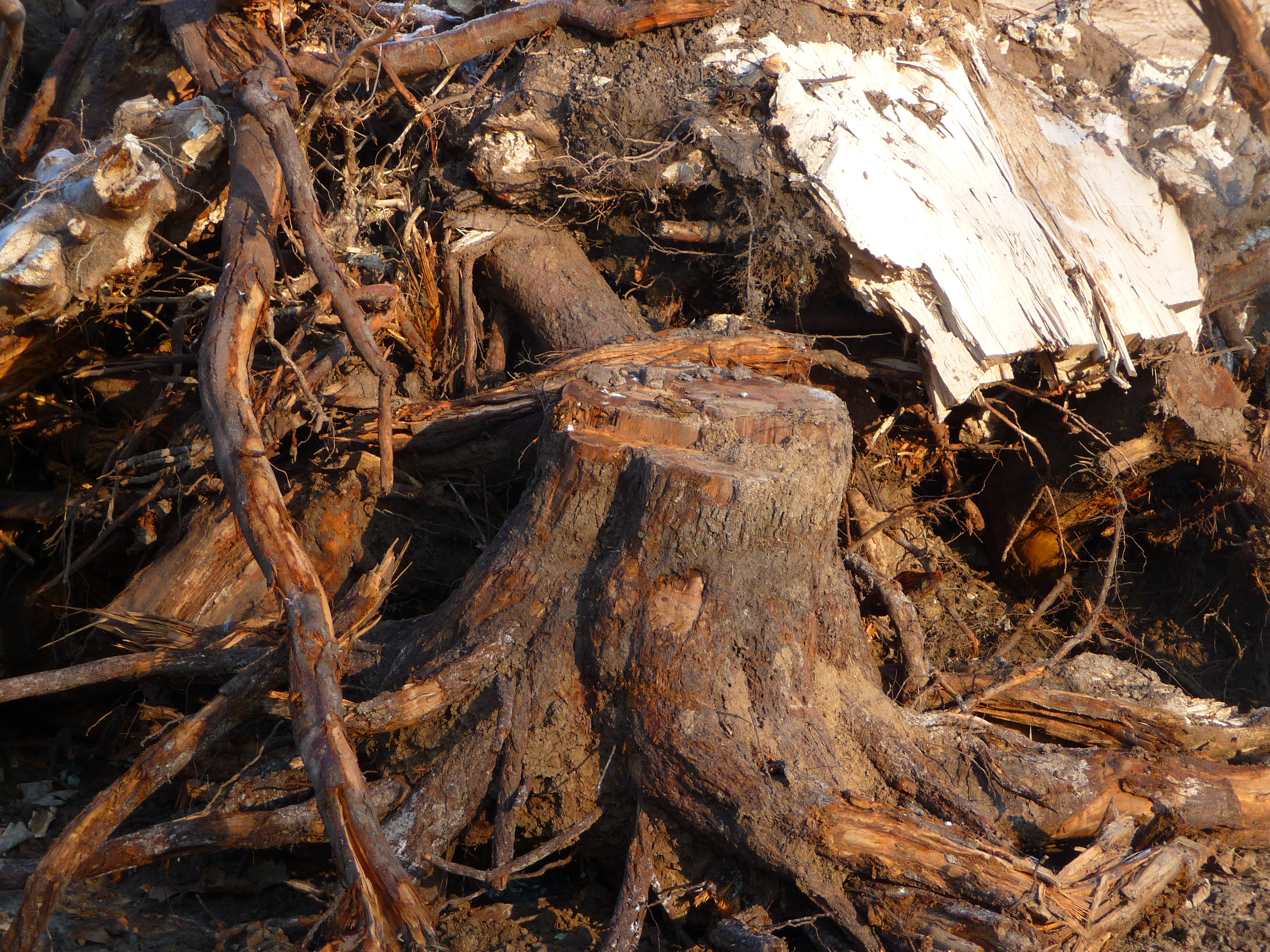
Uprooted tree stumps

Stump harvesting is not a new process. Records of tree stumps being dug out of the ground for wood fuel go back hundreds of years in Europe. It was practiced in the 1970s in Swedish forests before declining in popularity, but is being considered again there now that there is a greater need for fuel wood. In Britain, stumps are removed in some forests for disease control, especially in south-east England. Additionally, they are extracted where restoring plantation forest areas to peat bog for conservation reasons. Recently small scale commercial stump harvesting has started in parts of Scotland to provide fuel for biomass power stations. In Finland, stumps were at one time used to produce tar and charcoal. In the 1970s, a number of trials were set up in Finland to examine the viability of stump harvesting for woody biomass, but it is only in recent years that it has developed into a large scale commercial operation.

== Naval stores ==
Stump harvesting was an important part of the naval stores industry in the 20th century in the United States. The primary source of naval stores in the United States in the 20th century was the longleaf pine of the Eastern woodlands of the United States. While turpentine and other products were traditionally obtained by collecting resin from living trees, lumber from the trees was also in demand, and many longleaf pine forests were clear cut, leaving only stumps. After efficient machinery was developed for chipping wood, it became profitable to dig up old pine stumps and extract turpentine and other products from the resinous wood. Other industrial processes for producing naval stores have much reduced the use of pine wood for naval stores.

== Sources ==
- Schenk, H.J., and R.B. Jackson. 2002. The global biogeography of roots. Ecological Monographs 72 (3): 311-328.
- Staaf, H. and Olsson, B.A. 2004. Effects of slash removal and stump harvesting on soil water chemistry in a clearcutting in SW Sweden. Scandinavian Journal of Forest Research 9 (4): 305-310.
- Sutton, R.F., and R.W. Tinus. 1983. Root and root system terminology. Forest Science Monograph 24 pp 137.
- Phillips, W.S. 1963. Depth of roots in soil. Ecology 44 (2): 424.
