= Jordan Canal Park =

Park in Jordan, New York

Coordinates: 43°3′58.58″N 76°28′20.41″W

Jordan Aqueduct

Jordan Canal Park in Jordan, New York includes the Jordan Aqueduct, which carried the Erie Canal over Skaneateles Creek.

There is a pathway along the canal through the village.
