= Thomas S. Allen =

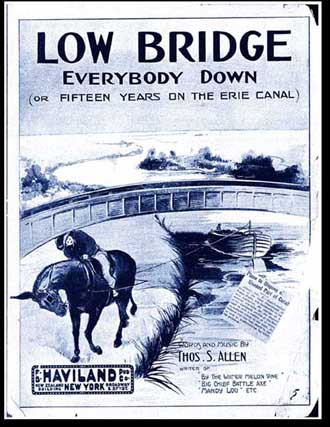
Cover of sheet music published in 1913.

Thomas S. Allen (1876–1919), an early figure in Tin Pan Alley, was an American vaudeville composer, manager, and violinist. He was born in Natick, Massachusetts, and died in Boston.

== Popular songs ==
In 1902, his popular fusion of schottische and ragtime, "Any Rags," became a major hit. Its companion song is "Scissors to Grind."

== Modern impact ==
- "Whip and Spur" (1902) is performed at circuses and rodeos.
- "Low Bridge, Everybody Down," also known as "Fifteen Years on the Erie Canal" or "Fifteen Miles on the Erie Canal" (1913) is a well-known song, often referred to as a folk song. Included in the Seeger Sessions, folk album by Bruce Springsteen
- T. S. Eliot spliced lines together from two songs for The Waste Land.

== List of works ==
- Behind the Hounds (1900)
- The Horse Marines (1901)
- The High Roller (1902)
- Soap Bubbles (1904)
- The Naval Parade (1910)
- On the Curb (1910)
- The Suburbanite (1910)
- U.S.S. Rhode Island (1914)
- The Periscope (1915)
