= Waterford (disambiguation) =

Waterford is a city in County Waterford, Ireland.

Waterford may also refer to:

== Places ==
=== Australia ===
- Waterford, Western Australia
- Waterford, Queensland, a suburb
  - Electoral district of Waterford, the electoral district for that suburb

=== Canada ===
- Waterford Parish, New Brunswick
- Waterford, Nova Scotia
- Waterford, Ontario
- New Waterford, Nova Scotia

=== England ===
- Waterford, Hertfordshire
- The yacht basin and mudflats of the former docks area in Lymington, Hampshire

=== Jamaica ===
- A neighbourhood in the city of Portmore

=== South Africa ===
- Waterford, Eastern Cape

=== United States ===
- Waterford Township (disambiguation)
- Waterford, California
- Waterford Village, California
- Waterford, Connecticut, a town
  - Waterford (CDP), Connecticut, a census-designated place
- Waterford, Indiana
- Waterford, Maine
- Waterford, New York
  - Waterford (village), New York, within the town
- Waterford, Knox County, Ohio
- Waterford, Washington County, Ohio
- Waterford, Pennsylvania
- Waterford, Rhode Island
- Waterford, Vermont
- Waterford, Virginia
- Waterford (town), Wisconsin
  - Waterford, Wisconsin, village mostly within the town

=== Zimbabwe ===
- Waterford, an outlying suburb of Bulawayo

== Electoral divisions ==
- Waterford (Dáil constituency), current electoral division for County Waterford, Ireland
- Electoral district of Waterford current electoral division in Queensland, Australia
- Waterford City (UK Parliament constituency), electoral division for Waterford, Ireland until 1922
- County Waterford (UK Parliament constituency), electoral division for County Waterford, Ireland until 1922
- Waterford City (Parliament of Ireland constituency), electoral division for Waterford, Ireland until 1800
- County Waterford (Parliament of Ireland constituency), electoral division for County Waterford, Ireland until 1800

== Schools and colleges ==
- Waterford Institute of Technology, a third level college in Ireland
- Waterford College of Further Education, a vocational college in Ireland
- The Waterford School, a private K-12 liberal arts school in Sandy, Utah
- Waterford Kamhlaba, a United World College is located in Mbabane, Eswatini
- Waterford High School.

== People ==
- Crown Prince Waterford, American blues and jazz singer
- Jack Waterford, Australian journalist
- Janet Bragg (Janet Harmon Waterford Bragg), American aviator

== Other ==
- PS Waterford, a paddle steamer launched in 1874
- TSS Waterford, a passenger vessel launched in 1912
- Waterford Crystal, a brand of crystal glassware
- Waterford GAA, administrative body for Gaelic Games in Co. Waterford, Ireland
- Waterford F.C., Football club based in Waterford, Ireland
- Waterford Airport in the southeast of Ireland
- Waterford railway station in Waterford, Ireland
- Bishop of Waterford in Ireland
- Marquess of Waterford, a title in the Peerage of Ireland
- Roman Catholic Diocese of Waterford and Lismore in Ireland
- Waterford West, Queensland, a suburb of Brisbane, Australia
- Waterford Nuclear Generating Station, a nuclear power plant near New Orleans, Louisiana
- Waterford Precision Cycles, American bicycle manufacturer
