= Waterford (village), New York =

Waterford
- Village
- Village of Waterford
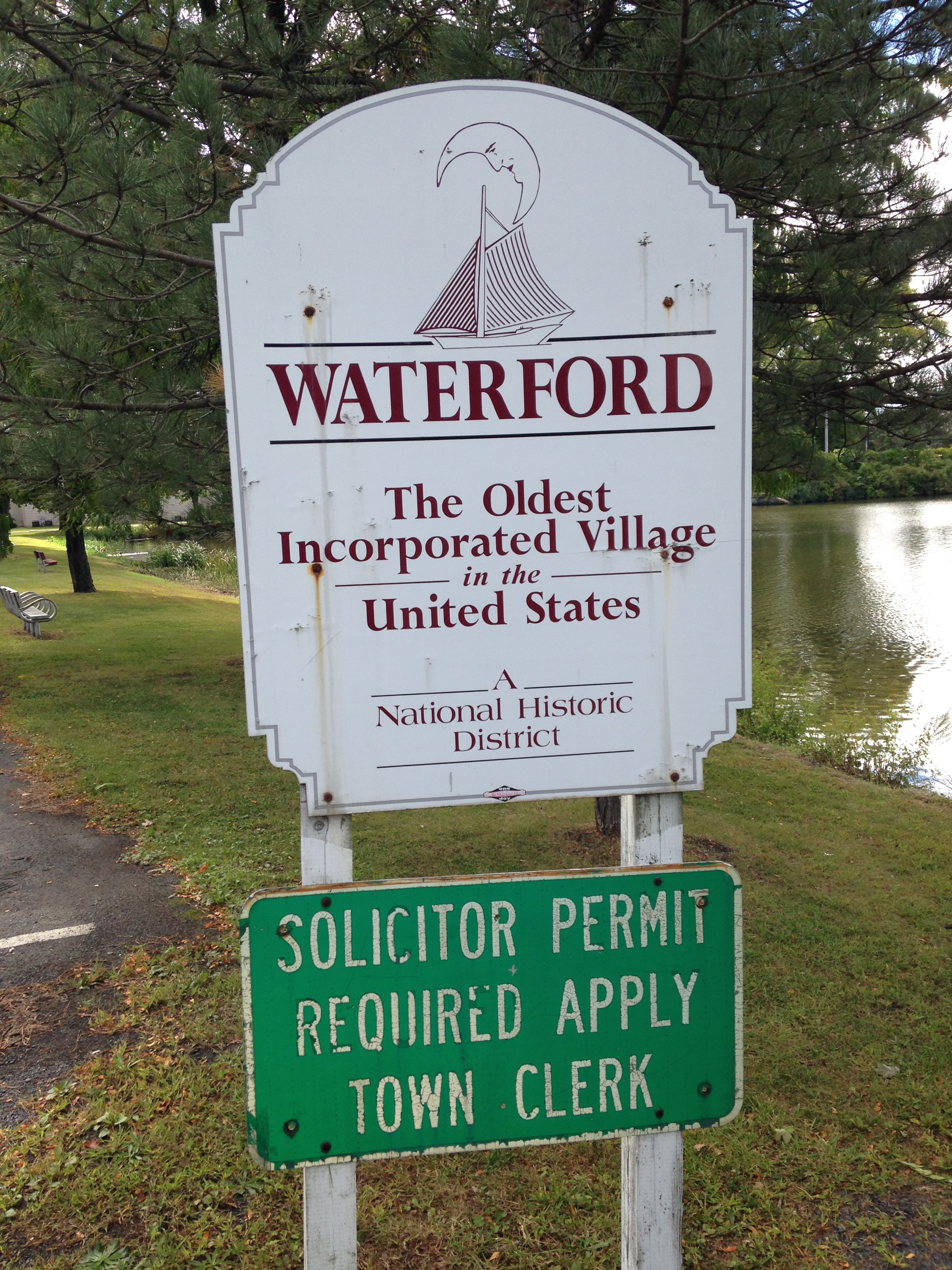
- Village of Waterford gateway sign

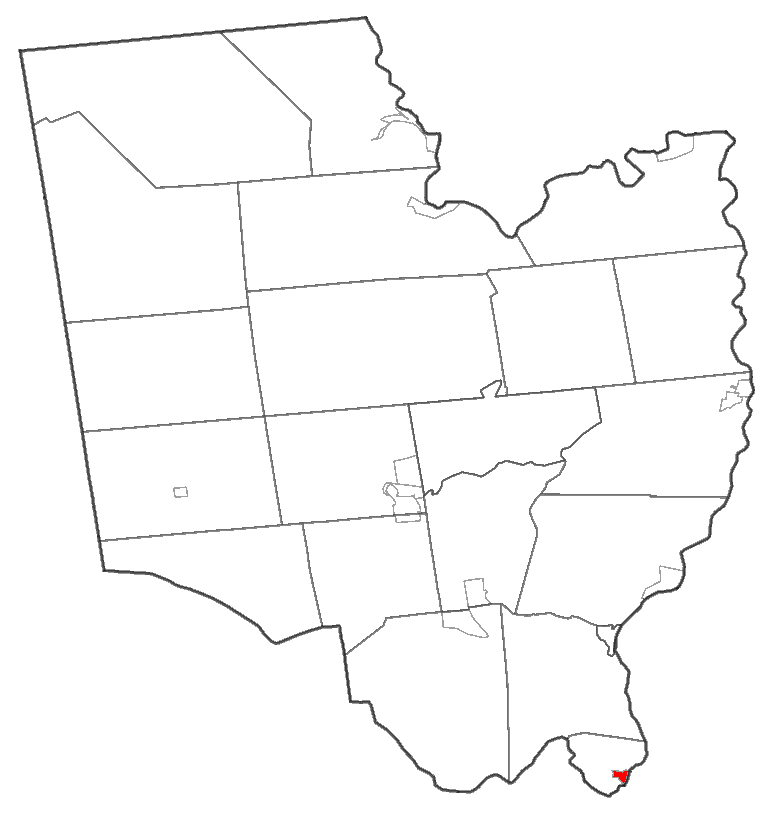
- Map highlighting Waterford's location within Saratoga County.

- Location within the state of New York
- Coordinates: 42°47′28″N 73°40′47″W
- Country: United States
- State: New York
- County: Saratoga
- Incorporated: 1794

Area
  - Total: 0.36 sq mi (0.93 km^{2})
  - Land: 0.28 sq mi (0.73 km^{2})
  - Water: 0.073 sq mi (0.19 km^{2})
- Elevation: 69 ft (21 m)

Population (2020)
  - Total: 2,038
  - Density: 7,205.5/sq mi (2,782.06/km^{2})
- Time zone: UTC-5 (Eastern (EST))
  - Summer (DST): UTC-4 (EDT)
- ZIP code: 12188
- Area code: 518
- FIPS code: 36-78520
- GNIS feature ID: 0968897

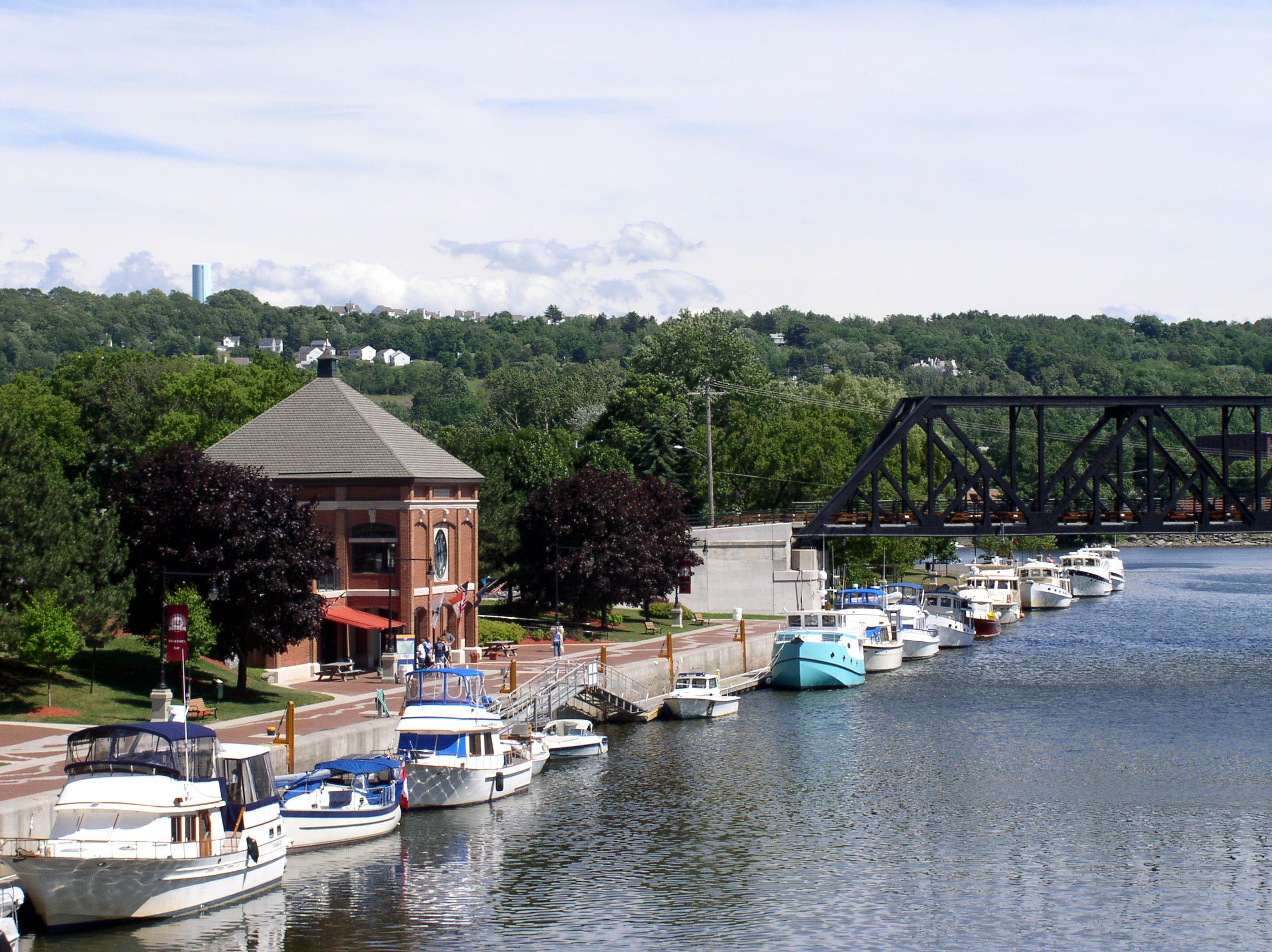
Waterford Harbor on the Mohawk River

Waterford is a village in Saratoga County, New York, United States. The population was 2,038 at the 2020 census. The name derives from the ford between the mainland and Peebles Island.

The Village of Waterford is located in the southeastern part of the Town of Waterford, north-northwest of Troy, New York. The village is located just north of the falls where the eastbound Mohawk River empties into the southbound Hudson River.

== History ==
The site of the village was occupied as "Half Moon Point" in the 17th century. It was then in the territory of Mahican natives. This early village was at the ford between Peebles Island and the mainland. The approximate location of this ford is in the area of the Second Street Bridge. Though the construction of the Erie Canal destroyed much of the ford for which the village is named, remnants of an unnamed and often submerged island can still be seen southwest of the entrance to the canal.

The village claims to be the oldest continuously incorporated village in the US. It was the first village incorporated by the state legislature in 1794, while part of the Town of Halfmoon, and was an established political entity before the formation of the Town of Waterford. Waterford Village is one of only twelve villages in New York still incorporated under a charter, the other villages having incorporated or re-incorporated under the provisions of Village Law.

== Geography ==
The Village of Waterford is located at 42°47′28″N 73°40′47″W (42.791127, -73.679758).

According to the United States Census Bureau, the village has a total area of 0.4 square mile (0.9 km^{2}), of which 0.3 square mile (0.8 km^{2}) is land and 0.1 square mile (0.2 km^{2}) (22.22%) is water.

Waterford is on the west bank of the Hudson River and north of Peebles Island State Park. The village was at the northern extreme of navigation on the Hudson River, and later became the eastern terminus of the Erie Canal and the southern terminus of the Champlain Canal. Although the north–south right-of-way of the Champlain Canal through Waterford has largely been abandoned and bypassed, the east-west Erie Canal continues to operate under the administration of the New York State Canal System (formerly called the New York State Barge Canal).

The historic Waterford Flight, comprising locks 2, 3, 4, 5, and 6 of the Erie Canal is located here, along with defunct former locks of the Champlain Canal. The Waterford Flight locks were opened circa 1918 to replace earlier locks that had first allowed boat traffic to bypass nearby Cohoes Falls, which had previously blocked all river traffic between the Mohawk and the Hudson Rivers. The Waterford Flight series of locks is one of the steepest in the world.

While much of the surrounding town has a high elevation, the Village of Waterford is very low relative to the two major rivers forming its borders. Its position at the convergence of both the Erie and Champlain Canals as well as the Mohawk and Hudson Rivers, has contributed to many floods. While major floods have been rare through the last half of the 20th century to the present, the most recent flood of significance was in late June and early July 2006. The flood forced the closing of the Erie Canal, stranding several boats in the locks.

Entering from the north, conjoined U.S. Route 4 and New York State Route 32 diverge in Waterford Village, with US-4 (as Broad Street) crossing the Hudson River eastbound into Rensselaer County and NY-32 crossing the Mohawk River southbound into Albany County. County Roads 96 (6th Street) and 97 (Washington Avenue) lead into the village from the northwest.

== Demographics ==
Historical population
Census	Pop.	Note	%±
1870	3,071		—
1880	1,822		−40.7%
1900	3,146		—
1910	3,245		3.1%
1920	2,637		−18.7%
1930	2,921		10.8%
1940	2,903		−0.6%
1950	2,968		2.2%
1960	2,915		−1.8%
1970	2,879		−1.2%
1980	2,405		−16.5%
1990	2,370		−1.5%
2000	2,204		−7.0%
2010	1,990		−9.7%
2020	2,038		2.4%
U.S. Decennial Census

As of the census of 2000, there were 2,204 people, 951 households, and 543 families residing in the village. The population density was 7,731.2 inhabitants per square mile (2,985.0/km^{2}). There were 1,062 housing units at an average density of 3,725.3 per square mile (1,438.3/km^{2}). The racial makeup of the village was 96.05% White, 0.77% Black or African American, 0.18% Native American, 1.50% Asian, 0.09% from other races, and 1.41% from two or more races. Hispanic or Latino of any race were 0.45% of the population.

There were 951 households, out of which 28.8% had children under the age of 18 living with them, 39.3% were married couples living together, 14.0% had a female householder with no husband present, and 42.8% were non-families. 34.8% of all households were made up of individuals, and 13.6% had someone living alone who was 65 years of age or older. The average household size was 2.30 and the average family size was 3.06.

In the village, the population was spread out, with 23.9% under the age of 18, 10.0% from 18 to 24, 31.6% from 25 to 44, 19.7% from 45 to 64, and 14.8% who were 65 years of age or older. The median age was 36 years. For every 100 females, there were 90.8 males. For every 100 females age 18 and over, there were 86.2 males.

The median income for a household in the village was $34,135, and the median income for a family was $45,375. Males had a median income of $35,543 versus $25,912 for females. The per capita income for the village was $18,141. About 11.4% of families and 12.6% of the population were below the poverty line, including 22.3% of those under age 18 and 6.1% of those age 65 or over.

== See also ==
- New York State Canal System
- Northside Historic District (Waterford, New York)
- Troy–Waterford Bridge
- Waterford Village Historic District (Waterford, New York)
