= Waterford Village Historic District =

Waterford Village Historic District may refer to:

- Waterford Village Historic District (Waterford, Michigan), listed on the National Register of Historic Places (NRHP) in Oakland County
- Waterford Village Historic District (Waterford, New York), listed on the NRHP in Saratoga County

== See also ==
- Waterford (disambiguation)
