= Waterford School (disambiguation) =

Waterford School may also refer to:

- Waterford School, a private school in Sandy, Utah
- Waterford School District, a school district in Waterford Township, Michigan
- Waterford High School (disambiguation), a list of high schools with similar names
