= Waterford Township, Iowa =

Waterford Township, Iowa may refer to:

- Waterford Township, Clay County, Iowa
- Waterford Township, Clinton County, Iowa

== See also ==
- Waterford Township (disambiguation)
