= Josephine Marks =

Josephine Casann Marks (born Guiseppina Casazza; February 1, 1903 – September 28, 2001) was an American philanthropist from Waterford, California, who designated a significant portion of her $1.3 million estate to benefit children and the arts. Estate checks were presented to the Boys & Girls Clubs of Stanislaus County, the Modesto Gospel Mission, the Stanislaus County Farm Bureau's Camp Sylvester in the Sierra for kids, and the Waterford Education Foundation.

Born Guiseppina Casazza in Boston, Massachusetts, in 1903, she was the third of six children of Italian immigrants. She Anglicized her first name to Josephine and later her last name to Casann. After her mother died in 1917, she and her siblings were sent to an orphanage. She later went to nursing school and came to San Francisco by train. While in Hawaii in 1941, she tended to injured survivors from the attack on Pearl Harbor while her ship voyage back to San Francisco included many of the wounded. At one point, she married a doctor, but the marriage did not last and produced no children. Marks moved to Waterford around 1974. She sold real estate and began to acquire rental properties and make loans to people the banks turned down. At one point she donated land to the city for an ambulance station. Upon her death, it took more than a decade to determine all of her assets, recover money due from outstanding loans, and sell off her real estate.
