= Oliver Tarbell Eddy =

American painter

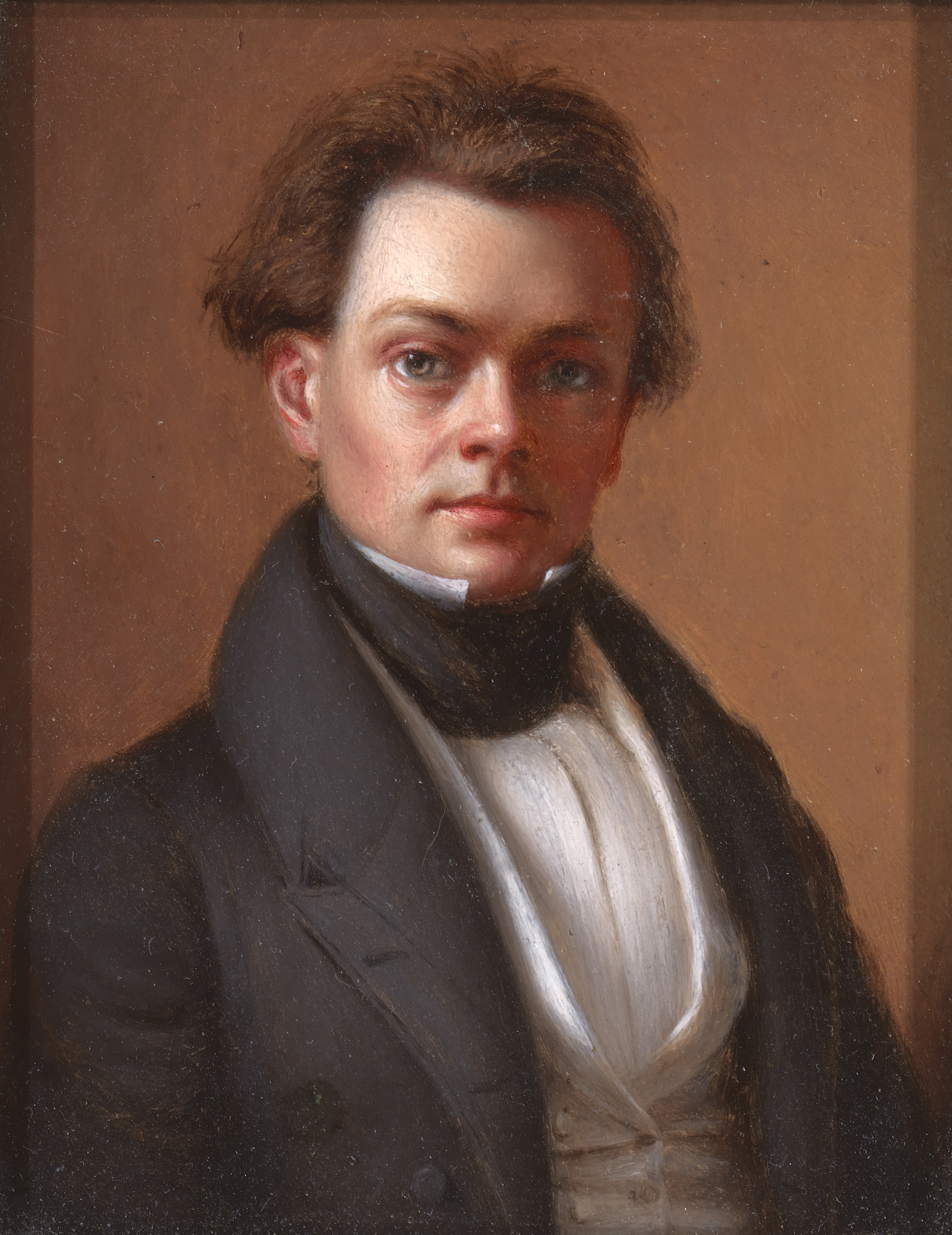
Self-portrait, ca. 1850

Oliver Tarbell Eddy (1799–1868) was an American painter.

== Biography ==
Oliver was born in Greenbush, Weathersfield, Vermont. His father Isaac Newton Eddy was a printer, inventor, and engraver. Isaac moved the family, including Oliver and his seven siblings, from Vermont to Waterford, New York in 1826. There, Isaac established the Franklin Ink Works, which manufactured printing inks.

Oliver was taught copper engraving by his father. He taught himself painting.

In 1822, he married Jane Maria Burger in Newburgh, New York.

He moved to New York City in 1826, where he worked painting portraits and miniatures.

In the early 1830s, he moved to Elizabeth, New Jersey, and moved to Newark, New Jersey, in 1835. He painted numerous portraits in Newark, particularly of the city's rising industrial elite.

Eddy moved to Baltimore, Maryland, in 1841. In addition to painting portraits, he invented an early precursor of the typewriter and patented several other inventions. In 1850, he moved to Philadelphia, Pennsylvania, where he lived until his death. He is buried in Woodlands Cemetery.

The Newark Museum of Art, Metropolitan Museum, and the Maryland Historical Society hold Eddy's paintings in their collections.
