= Lorna Balfour =

American producer and journalist

- Born: Atlanta, Georgia
- Education: The University of Utah
- Occupations: Television Personality, Actress, Producer
- Awards: Emmy Award

Lorna Gabrielle Balfour is an American Emmy Award-winning producer and journalist. She is Caribbean-American, with both of her parents hailing from the West Indian country of Trinidad and Tobago.

== Early life and education ==
Raised in Salt Lake City, Balfour attended private liberal arts institution, The Waterford School.

Balfour then attended The University of Utah, where she created her own interdisciplinary bachelor's degree. Her studies focused mainly on broadcasting, production, and marketing. She graduated May 5, 2016.

== Career ==
Balfour had roles in productions filmed in Salt Lake City, such as Touched By An Angel, Everwood, High School Musical 3: Senior Year, and a few other Disney Channel movies.

KSL-TV is the station where Balfour spent time working as a weekend news producer and reporter. Balfour reported on the on-air segment of ‘Your Life Your Health’ and wrote articles for the KSL 5 website’s news features.

Balfour worked at NBC Sports as an Associate Producer for the 2016 Rio Olympic Games. On May 10, 2017, Balfour earned an Emmy Award for "Outstanding Trans-Media Sports Coverage" for the "Games of the XXXI Olympiad".

== Awards ==
| Year | Award | Category | Nominated work | Result |
|---|---|---|---|---|
| 2017 | Emmy Awards | Outstanding Trans-Media Sports Coverage | Games of the XXXI Olympiad | Won |

== Filmography ==
=== Television ===
| Title | Year | Role | | Notes |
| Title | Year | Actress | Producer | Notes |
|---|---|---|---|---|
| 2016 Rio Olympics: Games of the XXXI Olympiad | 2016 | No | Yes | 20 Episodes |
| Everwood | 2003 | Yes | No | 8 Episodes |
| Touched By An Angel | 2001 | Yes | No | 1 Episode |

=== Film ===
| Title | Year | Role | | Notes |
| Title | Year | Actress | Producer | Notes |
|---|---|---|---|---|
| High School Musical 3: Senior Year | 2008 | Yes | No | |
| Hatching Pete | 2009 | Yes | No | |
