= Roberts Ferry, California =

Unincorporated community in California, United States

Roberts Ferry Dickinsons Ferry
- Unincorporated community
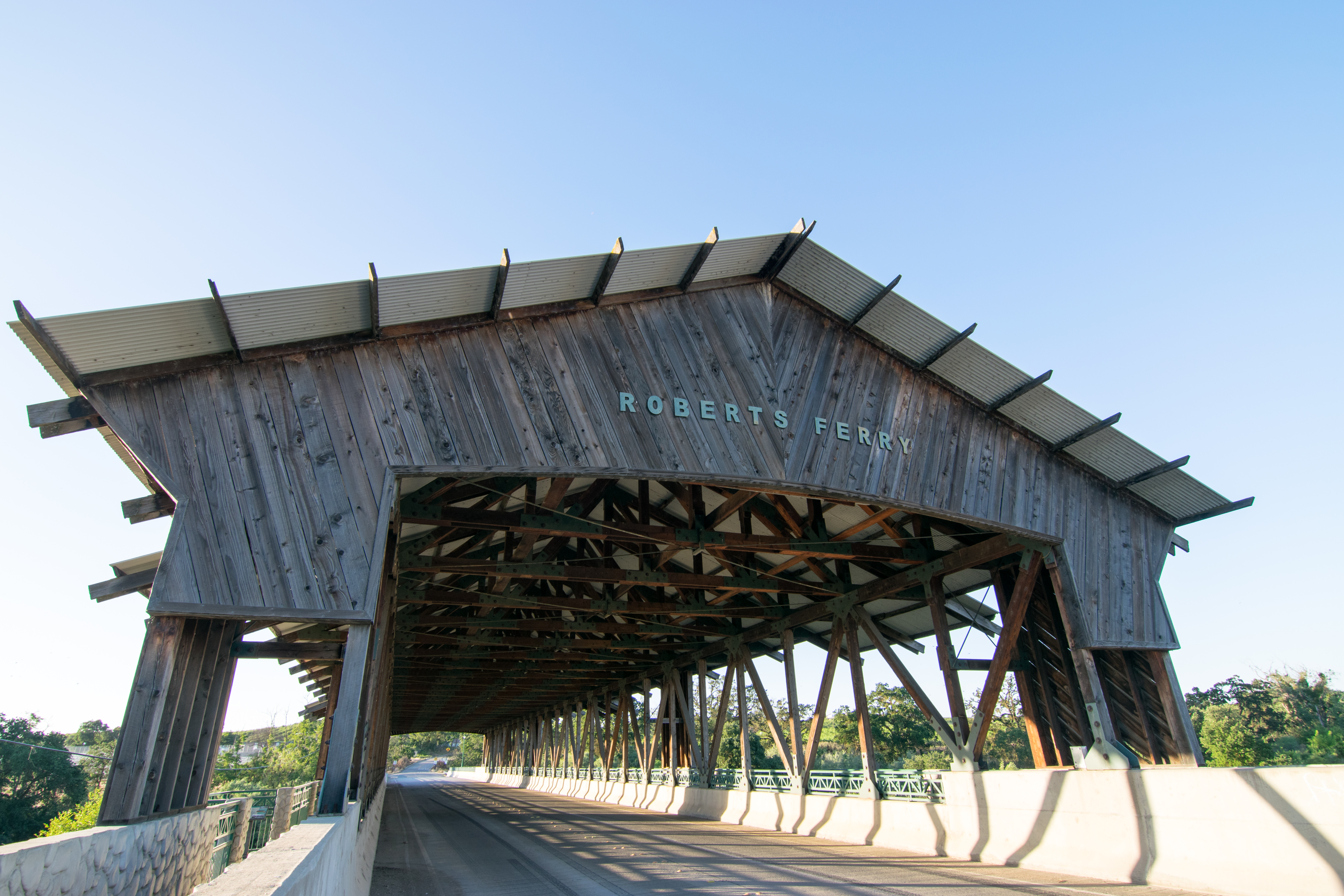
- Roberts Ferry Covered Bridge

- Location in California Roberts Ferry (the United States)
- Coordinates: 37°38′08.1″N 120°37′05.7″W
- Country: United States
- State: California
- County: Stanislaus
- ZIP code: 95386
- Area code: 209

Roberts Ferry (formerly Dickinsons Ferry) is a small unincorporated community in Stanislaus County, California, United States, approximately one mile (1.6 km) north of Turlock Reservoir.

Roberts Ferry is named after John Wesley Roberts, a native of Boston, Massachusetts who came to California in 1849 and operated a slaughterhouse in Waterford. Roberts operated a hotel at the site of the river crossing, built in 1865 and demolished in 2009.
