= Ormsby-Laughlin Textile Companies Mill =

- U.S. National Register of Historic Places
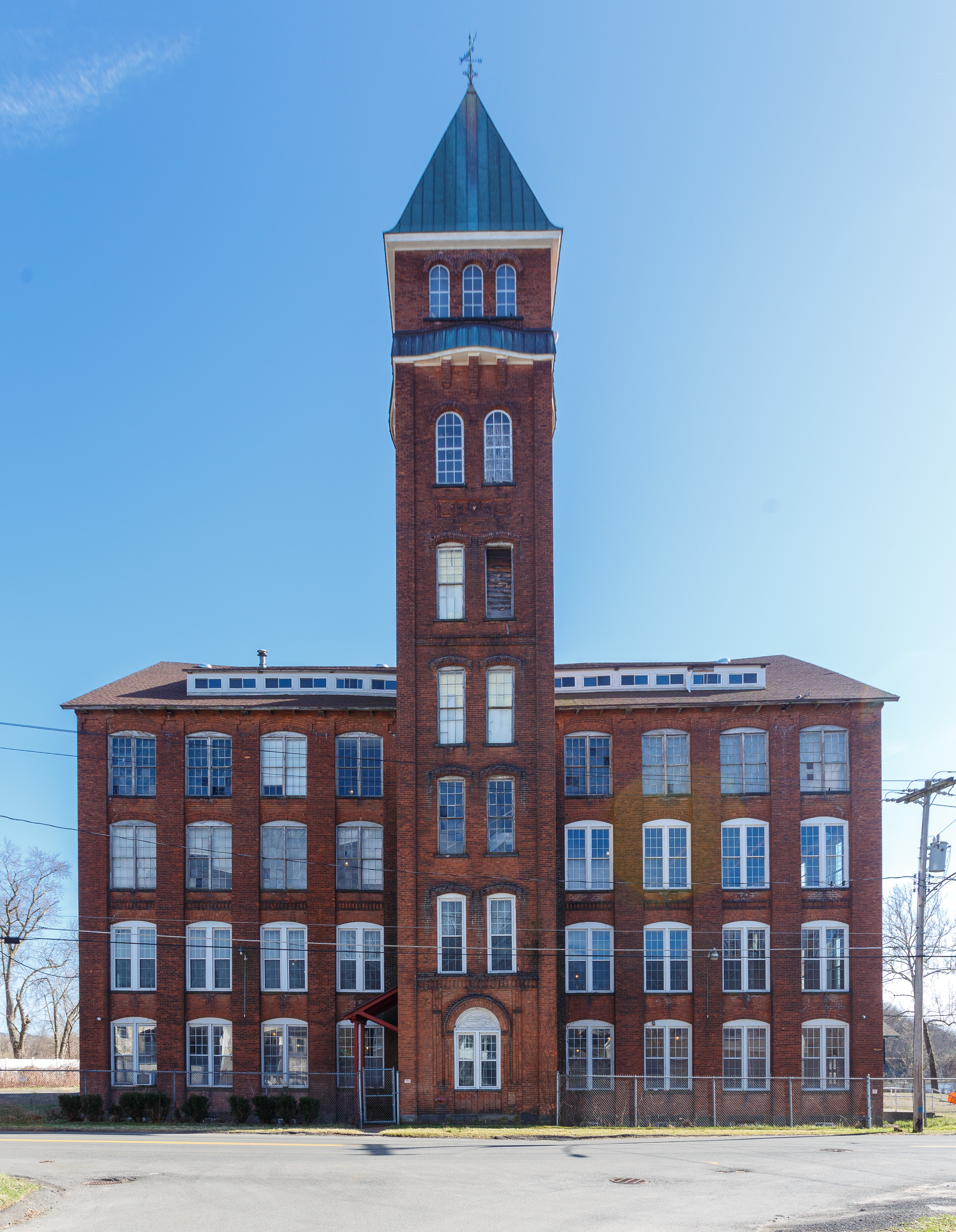

- Location within New York Location within the United States
- Location: 31 Mohawk Ave., Waterford, New York
- Coordinates: 42°47′18″N 73°41′0″W
- Area: 2 acres (0.81 ha)
- Built: 1894
- Architect: Breault, Medard
- Architectural style: Romanesque
- NRHP reference No.: 86000470
- Added to NRHP: March 20, 1986

Ormsby-Laughlin Textile Companies Mill is a historic textile mill located at Waterford in Saratoga County, New York. It was built in 1894 and is a 4 1/2-story, Romanesque Revival style, brick industrial building with a gable roof. It features a 6 1/2-story tower at the center of the front facade. The rear elevation features a 5-story elevator tower and a 100-foot-square brick smokestack attached to a 1-story wing. It is the only surviving factory associated with the major industrial community known as Dial City.

It was listed on the National Register of Historic Places in 1986.
