= Waterford, New York =

Waterford
- Town
- Town of Waterford
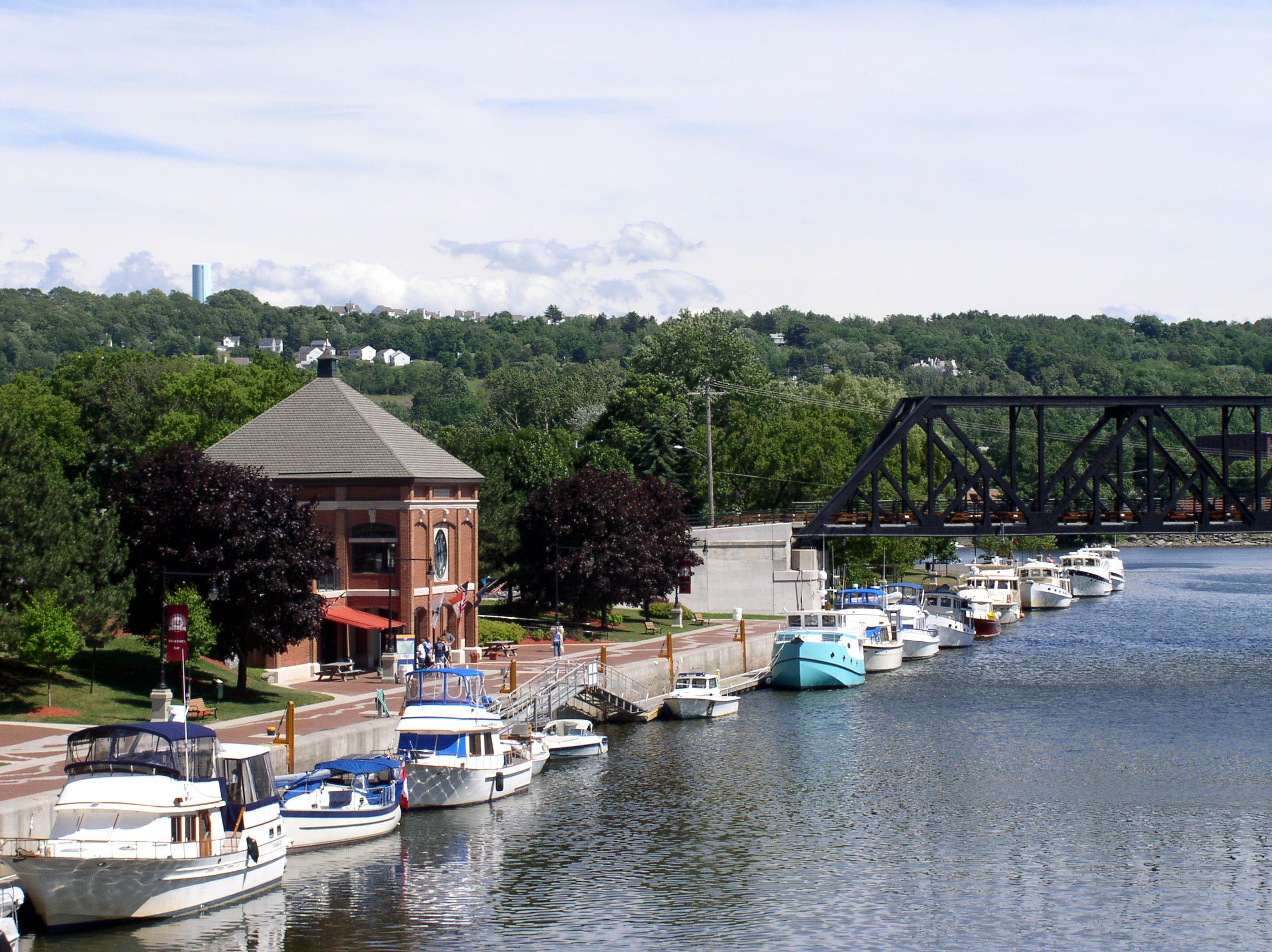
- Waterford Harbor on the Mohawk River
- Interactive map of Waterford
- Country: United States
- State: New York
- County: Saratoga

Area
  - Total: 7.4 sq mi (19.2 km^{2})
  - Land: 6.6 sq mi (17.0 km^{2})
  - Water: 0.85 sq mi (2.2 km^{2})

Population (2023)
  - Total: 8,106
  - Density: 1,230/sq mi (477/km^{2})
- Time zone: UTC-5 (Eastern (EST))
  - Summer (DST): UTC-4 (EDT)
- ZIP code: 12188
- Area code: 518
- FIPS code: 36-78977
- GNIS feature ID: 0979619
- Website: Town of Waterford

Waterford is a town in Saratoga County, New York, United States. The population was 8,106 at the 2023 census. The name of the town is derived from its principal village, also called Waterford. The town is located in the southeast corner of Saratoga County and north-northwest of Troy at the junction of the Erie Canal and the Hudson River.

== History ==
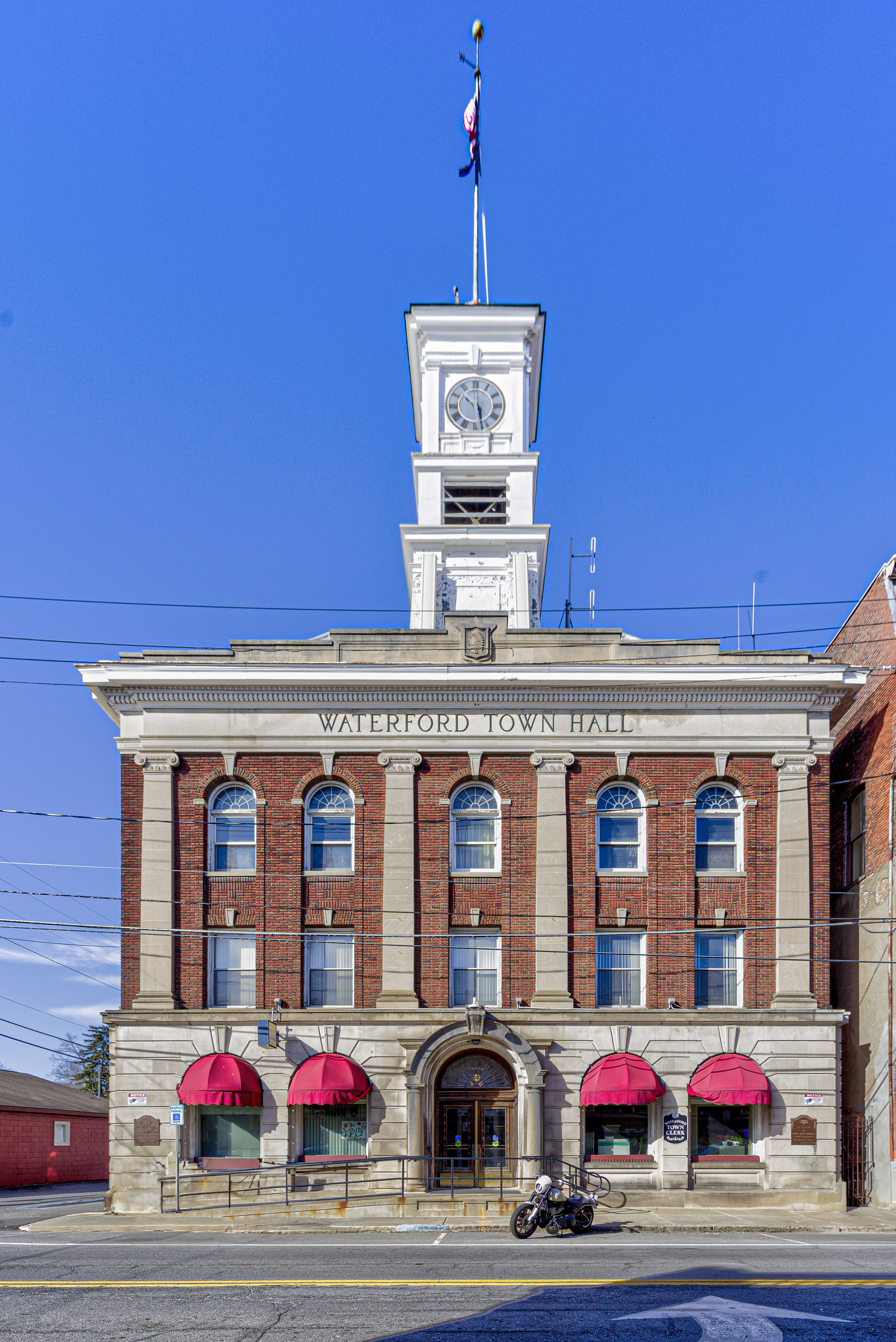
Town Hall

The village of Waterford is the oldest incorporated village in the United States, having been incorporated in 1794 before the town was formed. Waterford has been host to "Canal Fest" and "Tugboat Roundup" celebrations for many years.

The town of Waterford was formed from the town of Halfmoon in 1816.

=== Industrial revolution ===
During the industrial revolution, Waterford became a desirable location for manufacturing due to its position at the confluence of the Hudson River and Mohawk River, as well as the Champlain Canal and Erie Canal and three railroad lines. Fortunes were made here by industrialists such as the brothers Hugh and Canvas White, the Knickerbocker, Kavanaugh, Button, Breslin, and King families. The Eddy family was a major influence on the area; Isaac Newton Eddy established the Franklin Ink Works, manufacturer of printing inks, in 1831. His son George Washington Eddy established the Hudson and Mohawk Foundry, which produced stoves, iron castings, and steam car wheels. Another son Oliver Tarbell Eddy was a painter and inventor of an early typewriter.

The Northside Historic District, Ormsby-Laughlin Textile Companies Mill, Peebles (Peobles) Island, and Waterford Village Historic District are listed on the National Register of Historic Places.

== Geography ==
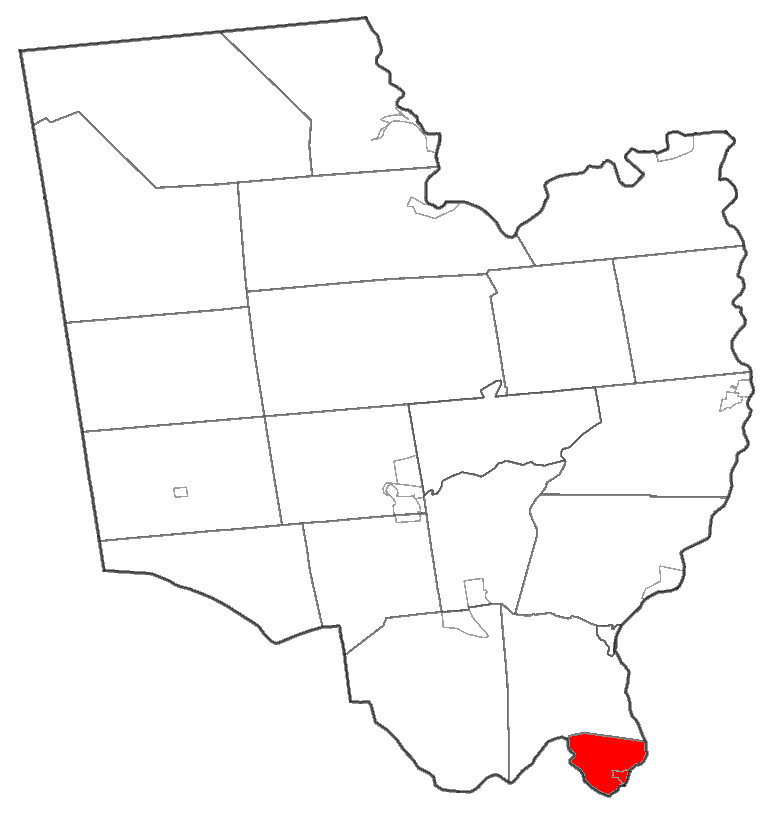
Saratoga County, New York. Town of Waterford highlighted in red

The Village of Waterford is located at 42°47′28″N 73°40′47″W, in the southeastern corner of the Town.

According to the United States Census Bureau, the town has a total area of 7.4 square miles (19.2 km^{2}), of which 6.6 square miles (17.0 km^{2}) is land and 0.9 square mile (2.2 km^{2}) (11.59%) is water.

The eastern town line, defined by the Hudson River, is the border with Rensselaer County, and the southern town line, defined by the Mohawk River, is the border with Albany County. The easternmost section and locks of the Erie Canal pass through the town and connect with the Hudson River. The Waterford Flight series of locks is one of the steepest in the world.

== Demographics ==
Historical population
Census	Pop.	Note	%±
1820	1,184		—
1830	1,473		24.4%
1840	1,824		23.8%
1850	2,683		47.1%
1860	3,260		21.5%
1870	3,631		11.4%
1880	4,328		19.2%
1890	5,286		22.1%
1900	6,157		16.5%
1910	6,128		−0.5%
1920	4,552		−25.7%
1930	5,667		24.5%
1940	5,709		0.7%
1950	6,052		6.0%
1960	7,231		19.5%
1970	7,644		5.7%
1980	7,194		−5.9%
1990	8,695		20.9%
2000	8,515		−2.1%
2010	8,423		−1.1%
2020	8,208		−2.6%
U.S. Decennial Census

As of the 2010 census, there were 8,423 residents of the Town of Waterford. The racial makeup of the town was 94.8% White, 1.3% African-American, 0.1% Native American, and 1.5% Asian; in addition, 1.8% of residents were Hispanic or Latino.

== Communities and locations in the town of Waterford ==
- Cohoes Falls – A waterfall on the Mohawk River, and a source of water power to early industry
- Peebles Island – An island at the south part of the town
- Momentive Performance Materials Inc. (formerly General Electric Silicone Products) – Manufacturer of silicone products and specialty chemicals, may be largest employer in the town
- Northside – Actually the south side of the town of Waterford. The name may be derived from its location on the north side of the Mohawk River. Northside may also derive its name from at one time being served by the "northside" part of the Cohoes Post Office (e.g. 123 Any Street, Northside, Cohoes, NY). After around 1960, all of Waterford was served by the Waterford Post Office.
- Peebles Island State Park – A state park in the south part of the town
- Prospect Hill – A hamlet north of Waterford village, on County Road 96
- State Canal Park – A state park in the western part of Waterford
- Sugarloaf Pond – A pond in the south part of the town
- Waterford Village – The village of Waterford, located within the Town, and right at the confluence of the Hudson and Mohawk Rivers
- St. Mary's of the Assumption Catholic Church
- St. Mary's of the Assumption Catholic School

== See also ==
- New York State Canal System
- Northside Historic District (Waterford, New York)
- Waterford Village Historic District (Waterford, New York)
