= Waterford Township =

Waterford Township may refer to the following places:

- Waterford Township, Fulton County, Illinois
- Waterford Township, Clay County, Iowa
- Waterford Township, Clinton County, Iowa
- Waterford Township, Oakland County, Michigan
- Waterford Township, Dakota County, Minnesota
- Waterford Township, Camden County, New Jersey
- Waterford Township, Ward County, North Dakota
- Waterford Township, Washington County, Ohio
- Waterford Township, Pennsylvania

See also

- Waterford (disambiguation)
