= Waterford High School (California) =

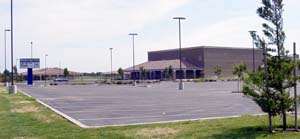
- Campus of Waterford High School, as viewed from the intersection of Reinway Ave. and Yosemite Blvd.

Location
- 121 S. Reinway Ave. Waterford, California 95386; United States
- 37.63605°N 120.77483°W

Information
- Established: 2001
- School district: Waterford Unified School District
- Principal: Gregory Diaz
- Teaching staff: 30.30 (FTE)
- Grades: 9-12
- Enrollment: 589 (2023-2024)
- Student to teacher ratio: 19.38
- Colors: Royal blue and gold
- Athletics: CIF Sac-Joaquin Section
- Athletics conference: Southern League
- Mascot: Wildcat
- Website: https://www.waterford.k12.ca.us/o/waterford-high-school
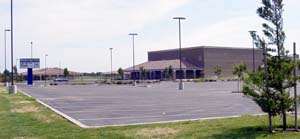

Waterford High School is a public comprehensive high school in Waterford, California, United States. Opened in 2001, it is the only high school in Waterford Unified School District.

== History ==
The school began being planned after voters approved a school bond in 1994. Before Waterford High School was built, students were bussed to Hughson, Oakdale, or Riverbank High School. Waterford High School opened in fall 2001.

After initial low test scores, the teaching staff took on the challenge of improving the delivery of teacher-directed instruction. The motto was "student achievement rises as instruction improves." Student test scores came up 105 points in 2003. The school ranked first among Stanislaus County high schools on the index in 2006. Waterford High School earned a Title I Academic Achievement Award and was named as a California Distinguished School in 2007.

== Campus ==
Waterford High is located on the southwest corner of Reinway Avenue and Yosemite Boulevard (California Highway 132). The campus includes four main classroom buildings, a gymnasium, and an auditorium, as well as a central quadrangle with raised planters and an outdoor stage where audiences can spread a blanket on Senior Hill. The western section of the campus houses the school's athletic fields and the Wildcat Stadium.

== Curriculum ==
All Waterford students take a college-prep curriculum.

== Extracurricular activities ==
Waterford High School belongs to the Southern League in the Sac-Joaquin Section of the California Interscholastic Federation. Its teams, known as the Waterford Wildcats, compete in basketball, cross country, football, soccer, softball, tennis, track, volleyball, and wrestling.
