= Waterford, California =

City in California, United States

- City
- Motto: Gateway To Recreation
- Interactive map of Waterford, California
- Location in the United States
- Coordinates: 37°38′42″N 120°46′3″W
- Country: United States
- State: California
- County: Stanislaus
- Established: "Bakersville" in 1857
- Incorporated: as "Waterford" on November 7, 1969

Government
  - Type: Council-Manager
  - City council: Mayor Charlie Goeken, Vice Mayor Jamie Hilton, Lupita Gutierrez, Christine Harris and Elizabeth Talbott.
  - City manager: Mike Pitcock

Area
  - Total: 2.38 sq mi (6.17 km^{2})
  - Land: 2.36 sq mi (6.11 km^{2})
  - Water: 0.023 sq mi (0.06 km^{2}) 1.72%
- Elevation: 171 ft (52 m)

Population (2020)
  - Total: 9,120
  - Density: 3,870/sq mi (1,490/km^{2})
- Time zone: UTC-8 (PST)
  - Summer (DST): UTC-7 (PDT)
- ZIP code: 95386
- Area code: 209
- FIPS code: 06-83612
- GNIS feature IDs: 1660135, 2412192
- Website: cityofwaterford.org

Waterford is the eighth largest city in Stanislaus County, California, United States. The population was 9,120 at the 2020 census, up from 8,456 as of the 2010 census. Waterford is part of the Modesto Metropolitan Statistical Area.

== Geography ==
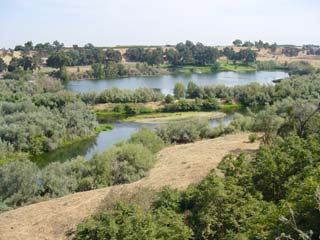
View of Tuolumne River

Waterford is located at 37°38′42″N 120°46′3″W (37.645132, -120.767609).

According to the United States Census Bureau, the city has a total area of 2.4 square miles (6.2 km^{2}), of which 2.3 square miles (6.0 km^{2}) is land and 0.04 square miles (0.10 km^{2}) (1.72%) is water.

The city was founded around the Tuolumne River. City population signs report Waterford's elevation is 161 feet (49 m) above sea level.

=== Climate ===
Waterford has a hot-summer Mediterranean summer featuring hot and dry summers and cool, moderately rainy winters. Due to its proximity to the Sierra foothills, Waterford tends to have 1-2 degree cooler average temperatures than its neighbouring Central Valley cities like Modesto and Turlock, which are more in the depths of the valley.

Climate data for Waterford, California (1981–2010)
Month	Jan	Feb	Mar	Apr	May	Jun	Jul	Aug	Sep	Oct	Nov	Dec	Year
Mean daily maximum °F (°C)	54.7 (12.6)	60.9 (16.1)	65.8 (18.8)	73.9 (23.3)	82.4 (28.0)	89.4 (31.9)	94.8 (34.9)	93.4 (34.1)	88.7 (31.5)	78.6 (25.9)	64.8 (18.2)	54.8 (12.7)	75.2 (24.0)
Mean daily minimum °F (°C)	37.1 (2.8)	42.2 (5.7)	45.2 (7.3)	48.2 (9.0)	54.2 (12.3)	59.1 (15.1)	62.7 (17.1)	61.7 (16.5)	58.4 (14.7)	51.6 (10.9)	43.7 (6.5)	38.7 (3.7)	50.2 (10.1)
Average precipitation inches (mm)	2.5 (64)	2.2 (56)	2.1 (53)	1.1 (28)	0.2 (5.1)	0.0 (0.0)	0.1 (2.5)	0.1 (2.5)	0.3 (7.6)	0.9 (23)	2.0 (51)	1.9 (48)	13.4 (340.7)
Source: NOAA

== Demographics ==
Historical population
Census	Pop.	Note	%±
1880	63		—
1950	1,777		—
1960	1,780		0.2%
1970	2,243		26.0%
1980	2,683		19.6%
1990	4,771		77.8%
2000	6,924		45.1%
2010	8,456		22.1%
2020	9,120		7.9%
U.S. Decennial Census

=== 2020 census ===
As of the 2020 census, Waterford had a population of 9,120 and a population density of about 3,868 people per square mile (1,493/km^{2}). 99.0% of residents lived in urban areas, while 1.0% lived in rural areas.

Racial composition as of the 2020 census
Race	Number	Percent
White	4,795	52.6%
Black or African American	145	1.6%
American Indian and Alaska Native	146	1.6%
Asian	138	1.5%
Native Hawaiian and Other Pacific Islander	34	0.4%
Some other race	2,322	25.5%
Two or more races	1,540	16.9%
Hispanic or Latino (of any race)	4,391	48.1%

The census reported that 99.6% of the population lived in households, 0.4% lived in non-institutionalized group quarters, and none were institutionalized.

There were 2,632 households, of which 47.9% had children under the age of 18 living in them. Of all households, 56.8% were married-couple households, 8.6% were cohabiting couple households, 20.1% had a female householder with no spouse or partner present, and 14.5% had a male householder with no spouse or partner present. 13.3% of households were one person, and 5.9% had someone living alone who was 65 years of age or older. The average household size was 3.45. There were 2,129 families (80.9% of all households).

The age distribution was 29.8% under the age of 18, 9.5% aged 18 to 24, 27.4% aged 25 to 44, 23.0% aged 45 to 64, and 10.3% who were 65 years of age or older. The median age was 32.1 years. For every 100 females, there were 96.8 males, and for every 100 females age 18 and over there were 97.4 males.

There were 2,707 housing units at an average density of 1,148.0 units per square mile (443.2 units/km^{2}), of which 2,632 (97.2%) were occupied and 2.8% were vacant. Of occupied housing units, 66.2% were owner-occupied and 33.8% were occupied by renters. The homeowner vacancy rate was 0.6% and the rental vacancy rate was 2.4%.

=== Income and poverty ===
In 2023, the US Census Bureau estimated that the median household income was $73,092, and the per capita income was $25,530. About 11.8% of families and 13.8% of the population were below the poverty line.

=== 2010 census ===
The 2010 United States census reported that Waterford had a population of 8,456. The population density was 3,569.8 inhabitants per square mile (1,378.3/km^{2}). The racial makeup of Waterford was 6,003 (71.0%) White, 77 (0.9%) African American, 110 (1.3%) Native American, 129 (1.5%) Asian, 11 (0.1%) Pacific Islander, 1,740 (20.6%) from other races, and 386 (4.6%) from two or more races. Hispanic or Latino of any race were 3,579 persons (42.3%).

The Census reported that 8,433 people (99.7% of the population) lived in households, 23 (0.3%) lived in non-institutionalized group quarters, and 0 (0%) were institutionalized.

There were 2,458 households, out of which 1,314 (53.5%) had children under the age of 18 living in them, 1,499 (61.0%) were opposite-sex married couples living together, 357 (14.5%) had a female householder with no husband present, 191 (7.8%) had a male householder with no wife present. There were 172 (7.0%) unmarried opposite-sex partnerships, and 15 (0.6%) same-sex married couples or partnerships. 305 households (12.4%) were made up of individuals, and 106 (4.3%) had someone living alone who was 65 years of age or older. The average household size was 3.43. There were 2,047 families (83.3% of all households); the average family size was 3.71.

The population was spread out, with 2,786 people (32.9%) under the age of 18, 902 people (10.7%) aged 18 to 24, 2,295 people (27.1%) aged 25 to 44, 1,860 people (22.0%) aged 45 to 64, and 613 people (7.2%) who were 65 years of age or older. The median age was 29.6 years. For every 100 females, there were 103.1 males. For every 100 females age 18 and over, there were 98.4 males.

There were 2,665 housing units at an average density of 1,125.1 per square mile (434.4/km^{2}), of which 1,627 (66.2%) were owner-occupied, and 831 (33.8%) were occupied by renters. The homeowner vacancy rate was 2.5%; the rental vacancy rate was 7.1%. 5,489 people (64.9% of the population) lived in owner-occupied housing units and 2,944 people (34.8%) lived in rental housing units.

== Politics ==
Waterford is located in the 4th Senate District of California and is represented by Republican Marie Alvarado-Gil and in the 9th Assembly District, represented by Republican Heath Flora.

In the United States House of Representatives, Waterford is in the 5th Congressional District and is represented by Republican Tom McClintock.

== Education ==
Waterford Unified School District is the sole school district.

The Waterford Elementary School is named after the former school superintendent and former elementary school teacher, Richard Moon. The school mascot is the moon cub (a tiger cub) and serves grade K-3. Immediately next to Richard Moon Elementary is the Waterford Head Start Program, which includes state preschool, full day Head Start, and half day Head Start.

Lucille Whitehead Intermediate School shares a campus with Moon School and was first opened for the 2008–2009 school year. The school was dedicated in honor of Lucille Bishop Whitehead. The mascot is the Bobcat.

Waterford Junior High serves grades 7–8. It is the oldest school in the Waterford School District. Their mascot is the tiger.

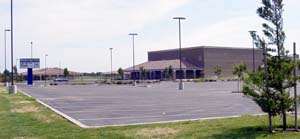
Waterford High School Campus

Waterford High School was built in 2001. Around 558 students attend the High School. The WHS mascot is the Wildcat.

== History ==
The community which became Waterford began to form in the latter half of the 19th century, after surrounding regions became populated with 49ers. At this time the area was known as Bakersville, after one of the town's influential members. It soon became apparent that mail was being mistaken between Bakersville and Bakersfield, California, and the smaller of the two was forced to change its name. At that time, the Tuolumne River did not have a bridge, and instead was crossed by Roberts Ferry on the waterfront. Since the area was well known for this ford, the town adopted the name of Waterford. For several decades, a regular steam locomotive could traverse the Tuolumne in Waterford on a trestle bridge, which was demolished in the second half of the 20th century. There are now no longer railway lines running through or near Waterford, even though many maps will still show the tracks going through the post office building.

== Transportation ==
State Route 132.

County Route J9

The city is served by Stanislaus Regional Transit Authority bus service.

Waterford has two main highways: CR J9, "F Street", and State Route 132, "Yosemite Blvd." Both intersect in Waterford. "F Street" goes to Oakdale to the north, and Turlock to the south. Yosemite goes to Modesto westbound, and to the Gold Country eastbound.

The Hickman-Waterford bridge is also located in Waterford. It is the only bridge for about 5 miles (8.0 km) both east and west to cross the Tuolumne River after Geer Road.

== Community ==
Waterford is a small city with a population of 9,120 according to the 2020 United States Census. With a land area of 2.38 square miles, the city has a population density of about 3,870 residents per square mile. Civic participation is visible through City Council meetings and local gatherings, including the annual Waterford Christmas Parade, which drew an estimated 3,000 attendees in 2024.

Community identity is further shaped by the city’s relatively young population, with a median age of 28.9 years, and by its cultural diversity, as 54% of residents identify as Hispanic or Latino. These characteristics support intergenerational ties and reinforce Waterford’s emphasis on neighborhood connections and shared traditions.

== Notes ==
- Earth Metrics Incorporated, "Waterford Junior High School, California Environmental Quality Act, Environmental Assessment", Waterford Unified School District, prepared for the State of California Environmental Clearinghouse, Report No. 7895W1.001, February 2, 1990.
