= Cohoes Falls =

Waterfall in New York, United States

- Kahón:ios (Mohawk)
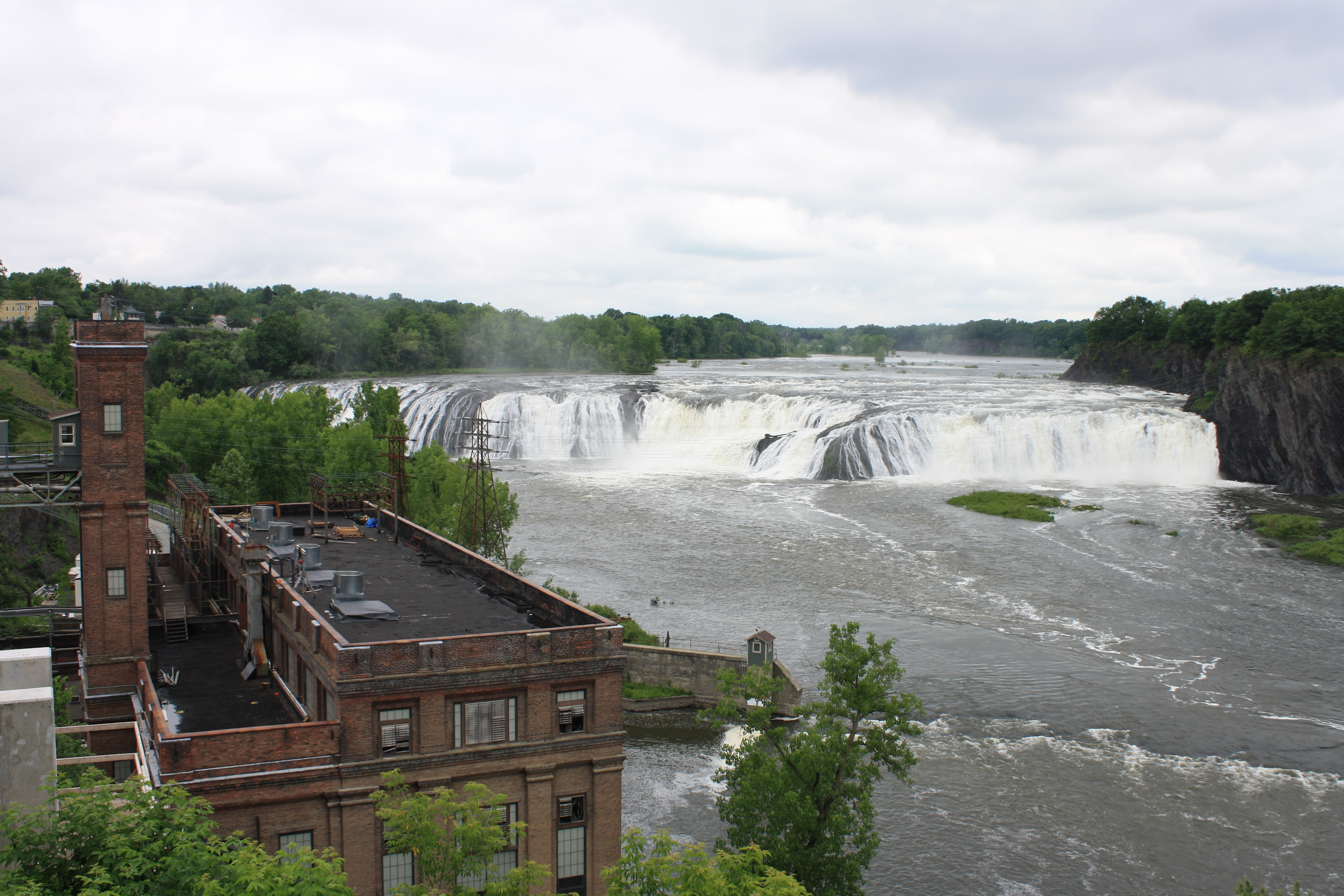
- From the south
- Interactive map of Cohoes Falls
- Location: Between Cohoes and Waterford, New York, United States
- Coordinates: 42°47′16.68″N 73°42′30.72″W
- Type: Block
- Elevation: 180 feet (55 m)
- Total height: 90 feet (27 m)
- Total width: 1,000 feet (300 m)
- Watercourse: Mohawk River
- Average flow rate: 34,638 cubic feet (980.8 m^{3})

Cohoes Falls (Mohawk: Kahón:ios, "a boat is in the water/is actively submerged") is a waterfall on the Mohawk River shared by the city of Cohoes and the town of Waterford, New York. It is roughly 1,000 ft (300 m) wide, between 75 and 90 ft (23 and 27 m) in height, and compares favorably in other measures to Niagara Falls, yet has no tourist industry and in fact dries up entirely in dry summers (due to water diverted to fill canal locks and generate power).

== History ==
Cohoes historian Arthur Masten incorrectly wrote in his 1880 history that the phrase might mean "Potholes in the River," referring to the potholes that appear in the riverbed when it is dry. However, Kanatsiohareke (Kanatsiohareke) and Kanatsio'háre (Canojahare) bear names with reference to this meaning in Kanien'ké:ha (Kanyenkeha).

In the oral and written tradition of the Iroquois (Haudenosaunee), Kahón:ios is where the Great Peacemaker performed a feat of supernatural strength, convincing the Kanyenkehaka (Mohawks) to become the founding nation of the Haudenosaunee Confederacy. Some historians believe the Kanyenkehaka (Mohawks) launched the Confederacy as early as 1142 CE, though other experts report dates ranging from 1450–1650.

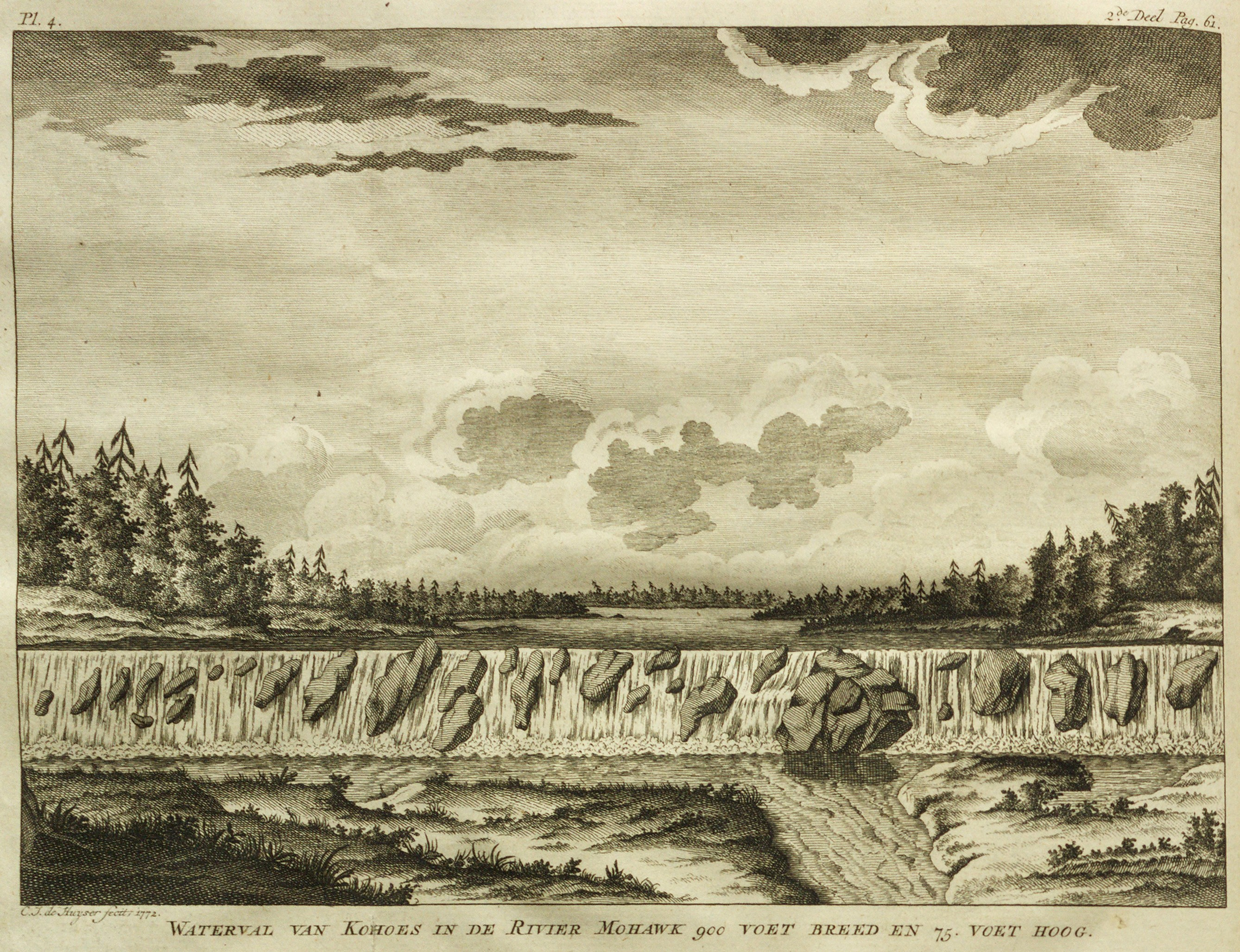
Early illustration (1772) of Kohoes Falls, from the book En Resa til Norra America by Pehr Kalm.

Celebrated by 18th-century travelers in letters and journals, Cohoes Falls, also called The Great Falls of the Mohawk, were regarded as the second-most beautiful cataract in New York State after Niagara Falls. In 1804, the national poet of Ireland, Thomas Moore, visited Cohoes and wrote a paean to the waterfall's beauty: "Lines Written at the Cohos, or Falls of the Mohawk River."

In 1831, town leaders built a dam across the Mohawk River to harness the power of the falls to fuel the turbines of the city's burgeoning textile industry. Over the next several decades, the predominant company, Harmony Mills, became the largest manufacturer of cotton in the United States, thanks to its control of local water rights. When all the mills closed in the wake of the Great Depression, city leaders leased the flow rights to a series of power companies, including Niagara Mohawk Power Corporation and Orion Power.

The Erie Canal was planned to overcome the navigational barrier of the Cohoes Falls. The original "Clinton's Ditch", the Erie Canal of 1825, was built through the city of Cohoes. The later Enlarged Canal was realigned, yet still went through the City of Cohoes. The Barge Canal, which opened in 1918, bypasses Cohoes and runs through the Village of Waterford via the Waterford Flight of Locks.

== Description ==
Cohoes Falls is 90 feet (28 m) tall at its high point and approximately 1,000 feet (305 m) wide. Its flow is greatest in springtime, sometimes running at 90,000 cubic feet (2,500 m^{3}) of water per second. The flow varies with seasonal variation of Mohawk River flow as well as with diversions for the Barge Canal locks, power generation, and the Cohoes water supply. During the summer, the falls are virtually dry, revealing shale formations. The 87-year average flow of the Mohawk River at Cohoes is 34,638 cubic feet per second, but this includes water diverted to the power plant and Erie Canal locks, not along the actual river course and over Cohoes Falls.

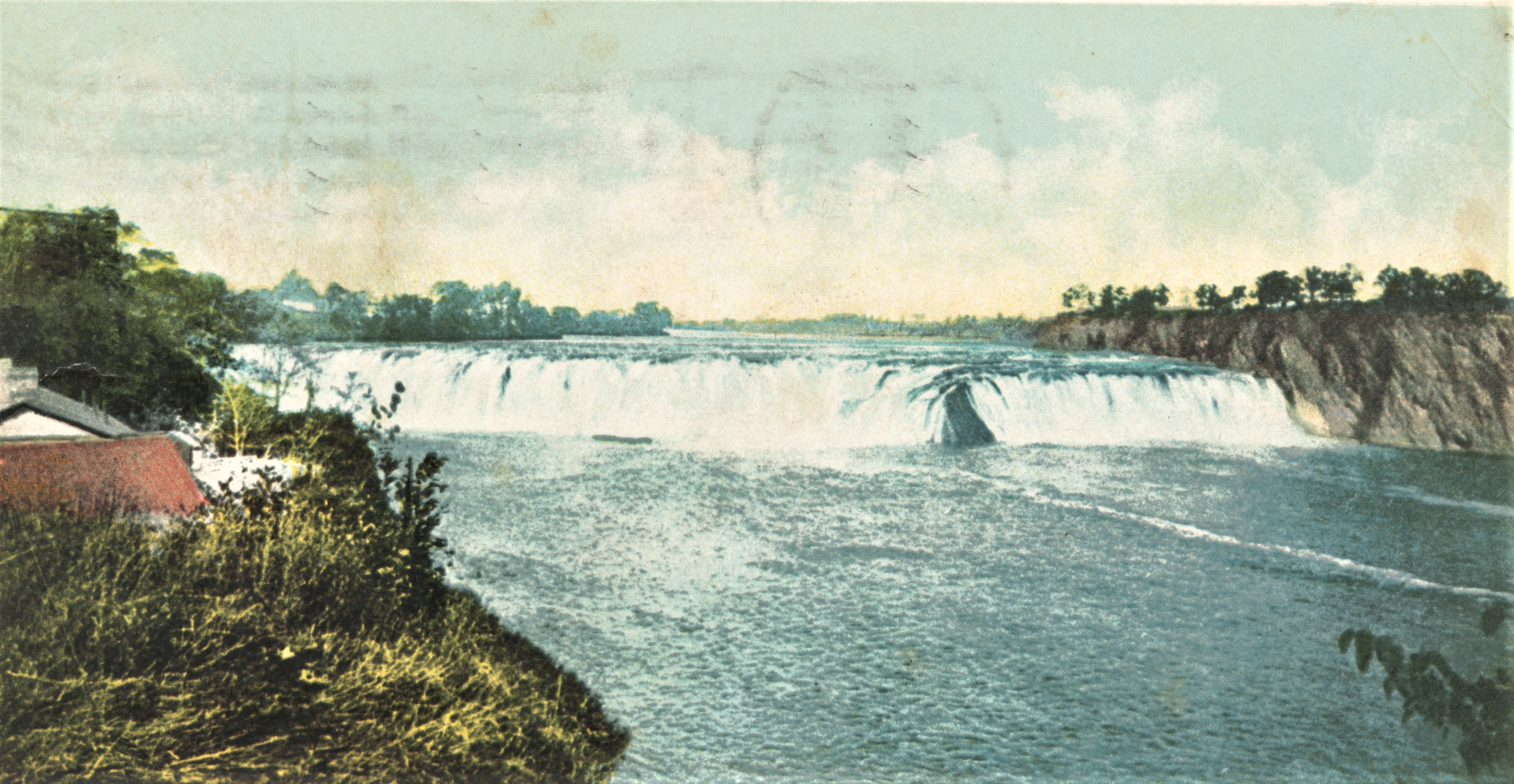
Hand-colored postcard of the falls (between 1898 and 1906)

Cohoes Falls compared to Niagara Falls
	Cohoes Falls	Niagara Falls	
	Cohoes Falls	American Falls	Horseshoe Falls
Approx. width	1,000 feet (300 m)	830 feet (250 m)	2,200 feet (670 m)
Uninterrupted fall of water	75 feet (23 m) (north side); 90 feet (27 m) (south side)	70 to 110 feet (34 m)	163 feet (50 m)
Water flow (range) (cubic feet per second)	From zero to 90,000, though it averages well under the 34,638 before flow is diverted for canal locks and power generation. (During Hurricane Irene in August 2011, the flow was estimated to be over 100,000 cubic feet per second with a total river flow of 117,000.)	5,000 to 21,000	45,000 to 190,000
Electricity generated (approx)	50 MW	2.4 GW (USA)	2.0 GW (Canada)
Tourist visits per year	Nil	Over 28 million (Canada & US combined)	

== Gallery ==
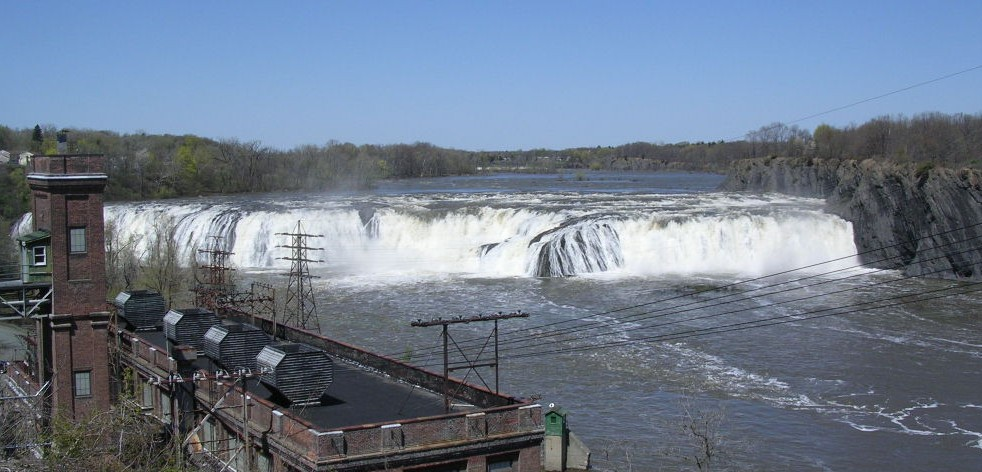
Cohoes Falls in spring with high volume of water

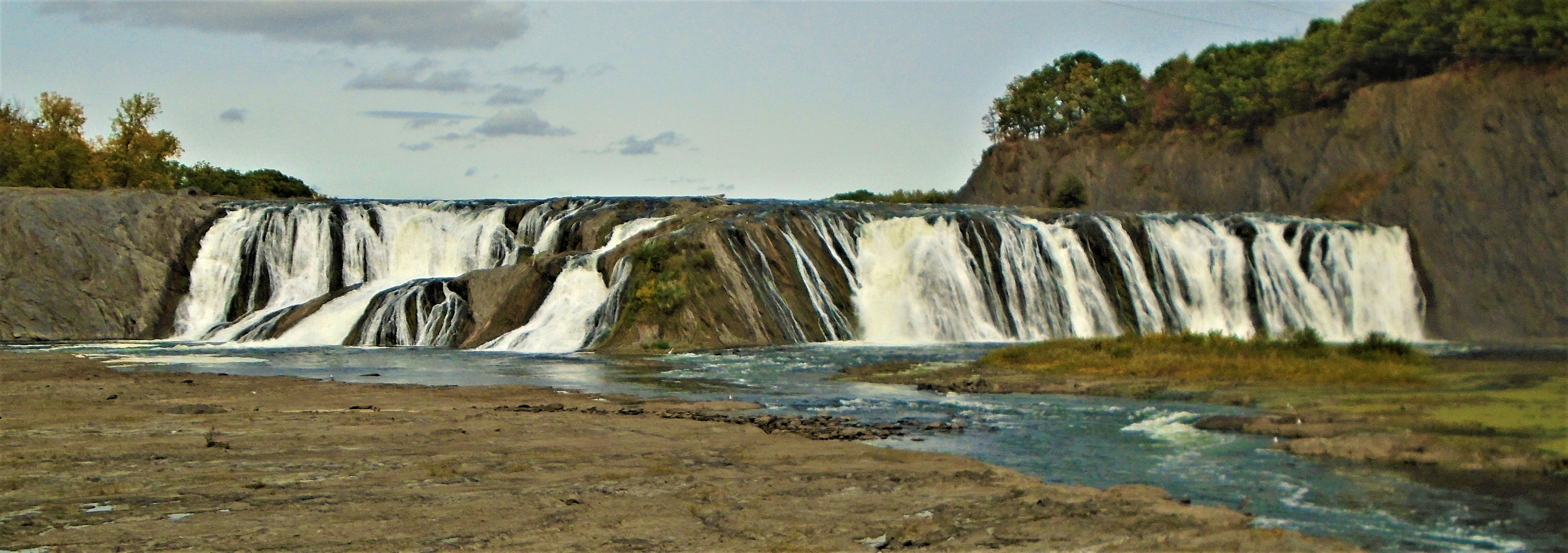
Cohoes Falls with low water flow

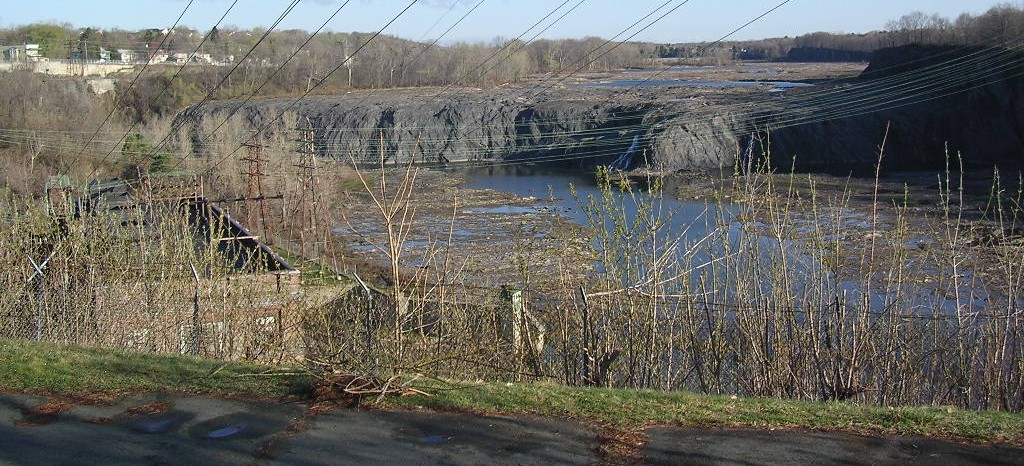
Cohoes Falls dry

== See also ==
- List of waterfalls
