= Waterford Unified School District =

School district in California, United States

Address
- 219 North Reinway Avenue Waterford, California, 95386; United States

District information
- Type: Public
- Grades: K–12
- NCES District ID: 0600063

Students and staff
- Students: 1,810 (2020–2021)
- Teachers: 81.79 (FTE)
- Staff: 123.72 (FTE)
- Student–teacher ratio: 22.13:1

Other information
- Website: www.waterford.k12.ca.us

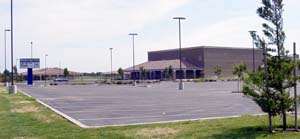
Waterford High School.

The Waterford Unified School District is a K through 12 public school district in Stanislaus County, California, United States. (Waterford, 2006) As early as 1989, students attending Waterford schools were bussed if they needed to cross State Route 132 to reach school.

== Noise issues ==
Sound levels at the Waterford Junior High School have been determined to be approximately 64 DbA, primarily due to roadway noise from State Route 132. This sound level is considered generally unacceptable from the standpoint of speech interference, safety and health effects.

== Schools In This School District ==
- Waterford Elementary School-Moon School (K-3)

Lucile Whitehead Middle School (4-6)

- Waterford Junior High/Middle School (7-8)
- Waterford High School (9-12)
