= Waterford High School =

Waterford High School may refer to:

== United States ==
- Waterford High School (California), Waterford, California
- Waterford High School (Connecticut), Waterford, Connecticut
- Waterford High School (Ohio), Waterford, Ohio
- Waterford Kettering High School, Waterford, Michigan
- Waterford Mott High School, Waterford, Michigan
- Waterford Union High School, Waterford, Wisconsin

== Elsewhere ==
- Waterford District High School in Waterford, Ontario, Canada
