= Waterford, Eastern Cape =

Town in the Eastern Cape, South Africa

Waterford
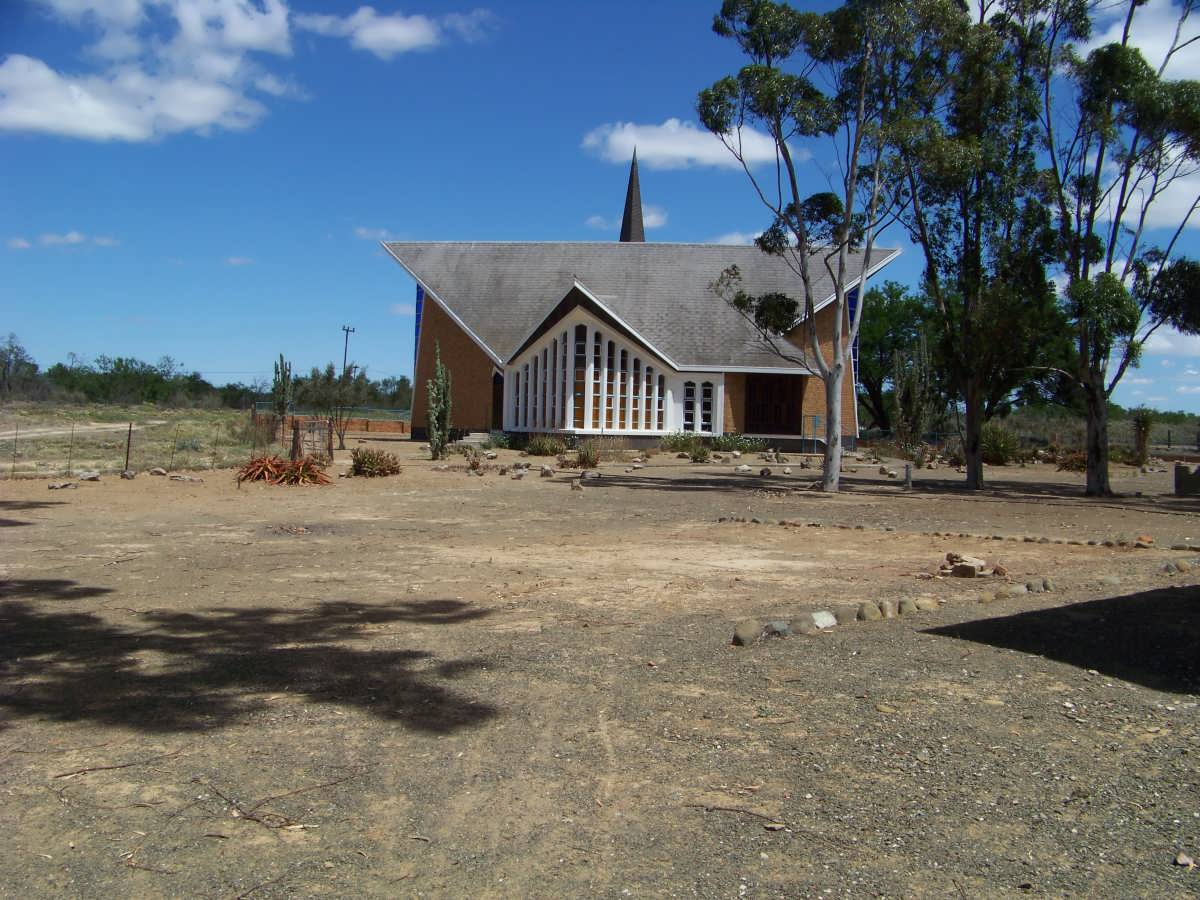

- Location within Eastern Cape Location within South Africa
- Coordinates: 33°05′16.62″S 25°02′37.75″E
- Country: South Africa
- Province: Eastern Cape
- District: Beyers Naudé

Area
  - Total: 26.74 km^{2} (10.32 sq mi)

Population (2011)
  - Total: 40
  - Density: 1.5/km^{2} (3.9/sq mi)

Racial makeup (2011)
  - Black African: 15%
  - Coloured: 68%
  - White: 17%
  - Other: 0.2%

First languages (2011)
  - Xhosa: 22%
  - Afrikaans: 70%
  - Sotho: 5.00%
  - Other: 2.5%

Waterford is a small town in the Eastern Cape established to provide services to the farming community. Since August 2016, the town falls within the Dr Beyers Naudé Local Municipality. It is a tiny, historic village founded by Irish settlers in the 19th century. Located near the Sundays River, the village is largely in ruins today, though a few original structures and a church remain. The area is set within the vast, rugged landscape of the Karoo and is best known for its proximity to significant nature reserves, rather than for attractions within the village itself.

== Bibliography ==
- Logie, Bartle: Sundays – tales from a winding river. Port Elizabeth: Bluecliff, 2011. ISBN 978-0-9870017-2-6
