= Northside Historic District (Waterford, New York) =

Historic district in New York, United States

- U.S. National Register of Historic Places
- U.S. Historic district
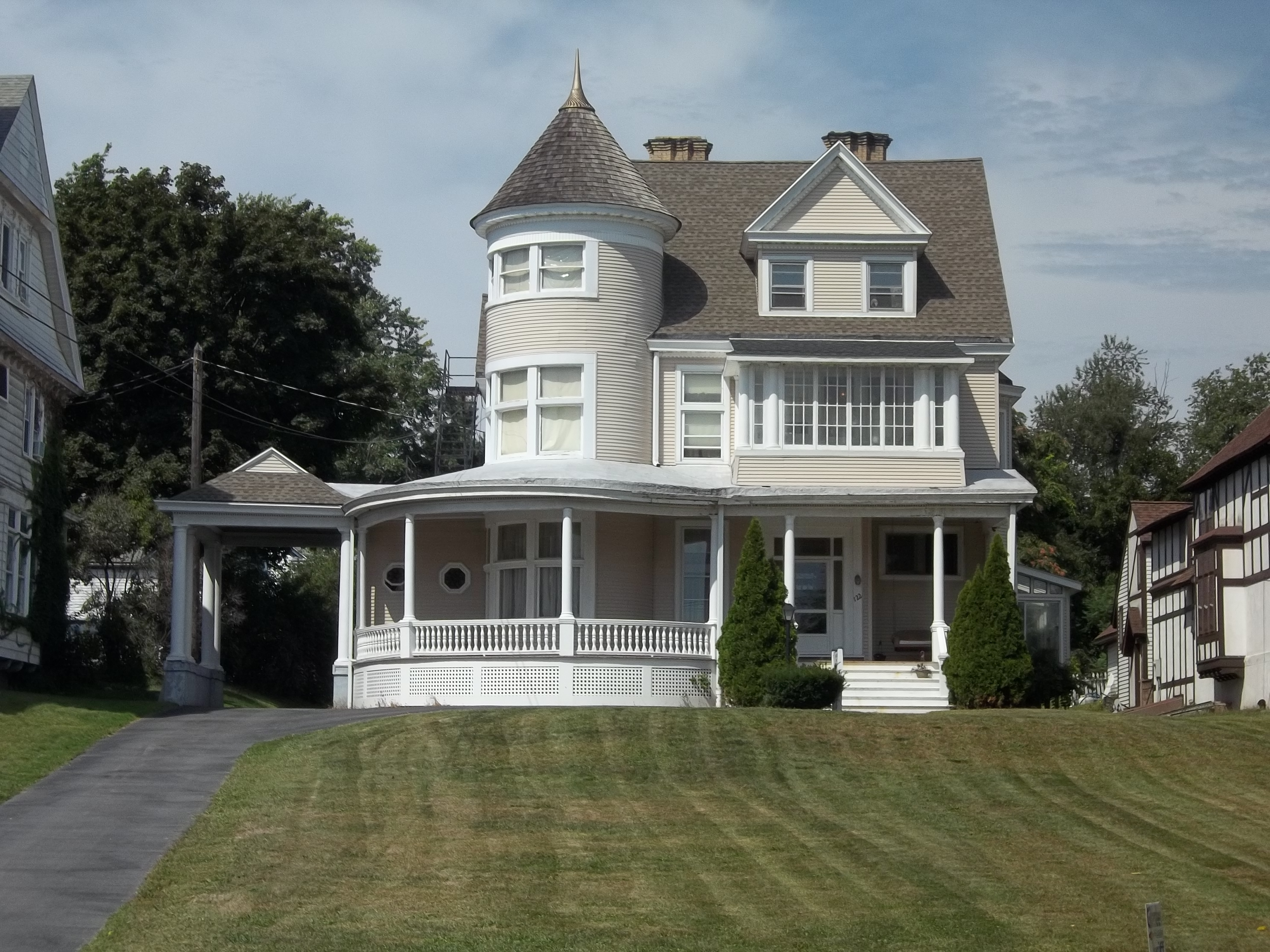

- Location within New York Location within the United States
- Location: Both sides of Saratoga Ave. (NY 32) from Maple Ave. to Roosevelt Bridge, Waterford, New York
- Coordinates: 42°47′6″N 73°41′34″W
- Area: 60 acres (24 ha)
- Built: 1828
- Architect: Multiple
- Architectural style: Greek Revival, Late Victorian
- NRHP reference No.: 75001226
- Added to NRHP: December 4, 1975

Northside Historic District is a 60-acre (24 ha) national historic district located at Waterford in Saratoga County, New York. The listing included 125 contributing buildings and one other contributing structure. The district dates to 1828 and includes Greek Revival and Late Victorian architecture.

The district is chiefly residential and is characterized by large and small structures including the mansions of mill owners and modest workers' dwellings. Notable residences include the Hugh White mansion and the William Mansfield home. Both are Greek Revival houses built about 1830. The Hugh White mansion serves as the Waterford Museum.

It was listed on the National Register of Historic Places in 1975.
