= Waterford Flight =

Set of locks on the Erie Canal in New York, United States

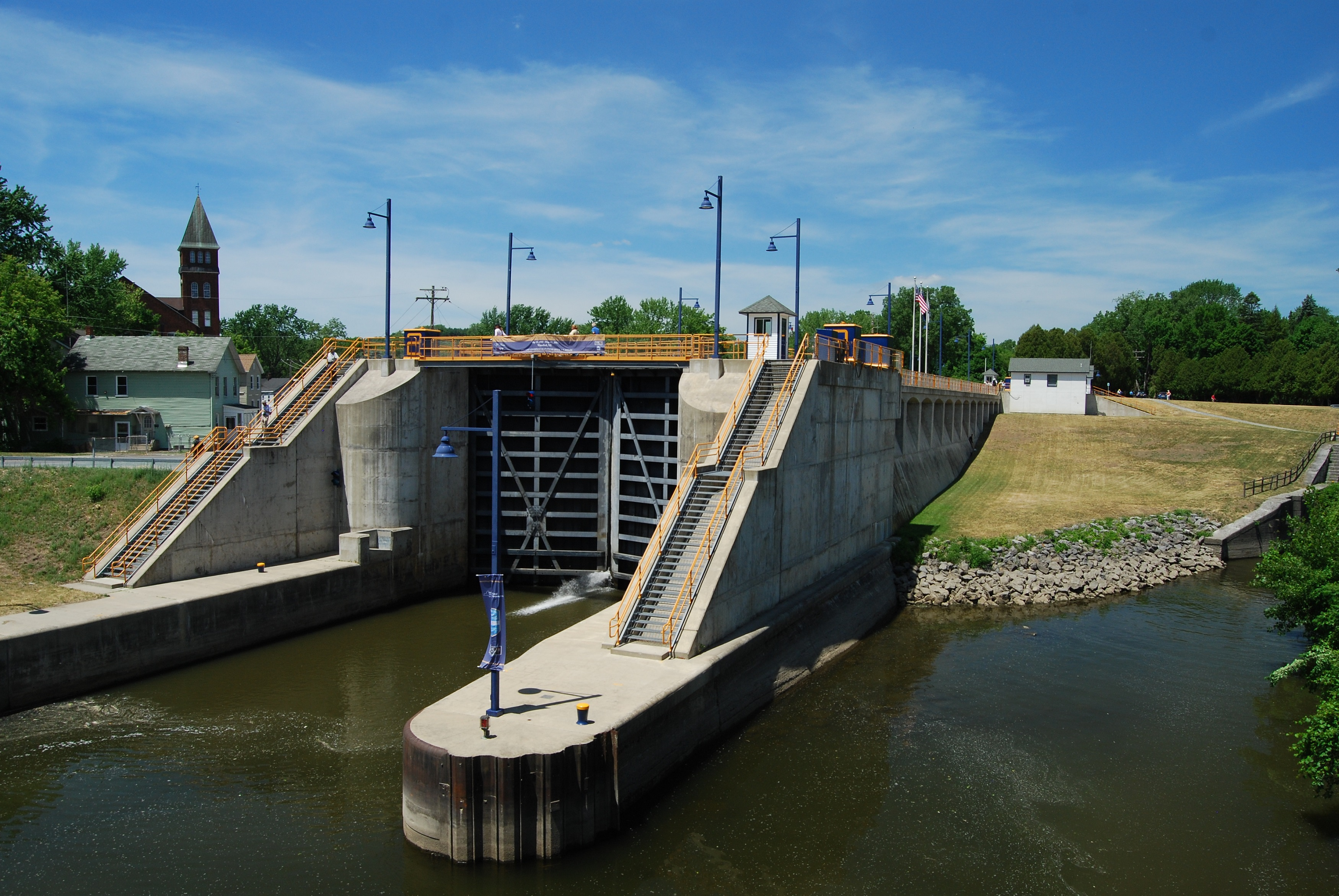
Lock E-2 in Waterford

The Waterford Flight is a set of locks on the Erie Canal in Waterford, New York. Erie Canal Locks E-2 through E-6 make up the combined flight at Waterford, which lifts vessels from the Hudson River to the Mohawk River, bypassing Cohoes Falls. Built in 1915, the Waterford Flight is still in use today as part of the New York State Canal System, which is open to public and commercial traffic. The Waterford Flight is the series of locks with the highest elevation gain (169 feet (52 m)) relative to its length (1.5 miles (2.4 km)) for any canal lock system in the United States.

== Planning ==
The original route of the Erie Canal bypassed Cohoes Falls to the south through the city of Cohoes. At the turn of the century, plans for an enlarged Erie Canal were being drawn up to accommodate more traffic and larger vessels. However, instead of constructing canals from scratch like had been done previously, the plan proposed "canalizing" the local rivers. For the plan near Cohoes, it involved routing a channel from the Mohawk River north of Cohoes Falls directly to the Hudson River at Waterford. Traffic would then flow directly from the Hudson to the Mohawk via the Waterford Flight and completely bypass the old canals from Albany to Cohoes. The Troy Federal Lock and Dam would serve as the unofficial start of the Erie Canal, with the first lock of the Waterford Flight being the official beginning, hence it being named E-2 to this day.

== Construction ==
Construction of the Waterford Flight began in 1905 and took 10 years to complete. The 5 massive locks dwarfed the previous iterations and were mandated to be 328 feet (100 m) long, 45 feet (14 m) wide, and 12 feet (3.7 m) deep. These dimensions became the standard on the Barge Canal System and have been maintained to this day. In addition to the locks, there are two large guard gates at the northern end of the flight. These gates can be lowered to block additional flow of water from the Mohawk River through the locks to prevent damage during floods. The locks have undergone periods of major restoration in recent decades, including replacement of lock doors and resurfacing of the concrete within the locks themselves.

== Today ==
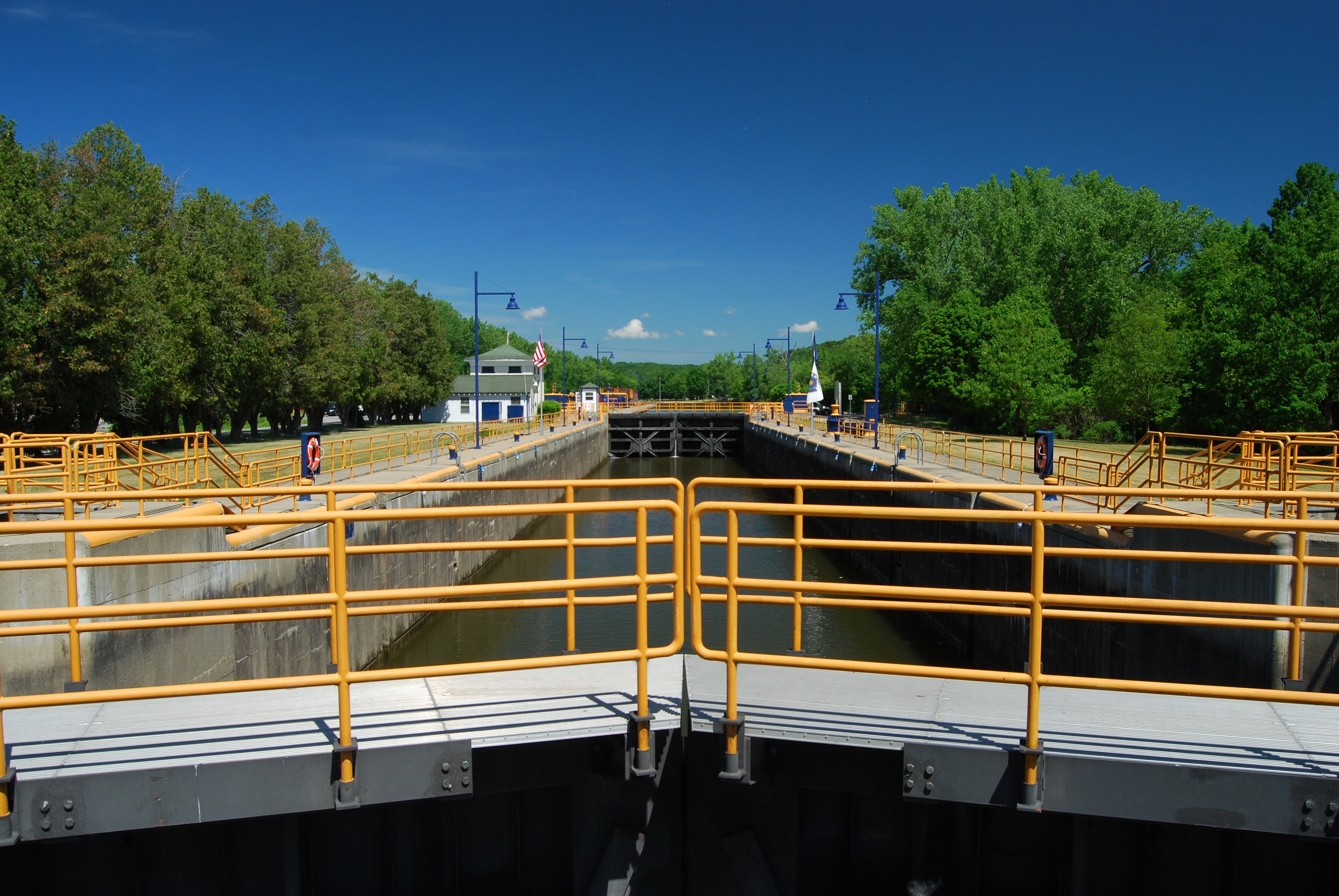
Gates at Lock E-3

Today, the Waterford Flight is in use and is managed by the New York State Canal Corporation. The site of the Waterford Flight is also home to Lock 6 State Canal Park, which follows the length of the canal between the Hudson and the Mohawk and allows public access to the locks and a boat ramp at the Northern end. The set of locks was designated as a National Historic Civil Engineering Landmark by the American Society of Civil Engineers in 2011.
