= Waterford Village Historic District (Waterford, New York) =

Historic district in New York, United States

- U.S. National Register of Historic Places
- U.S. Historic district
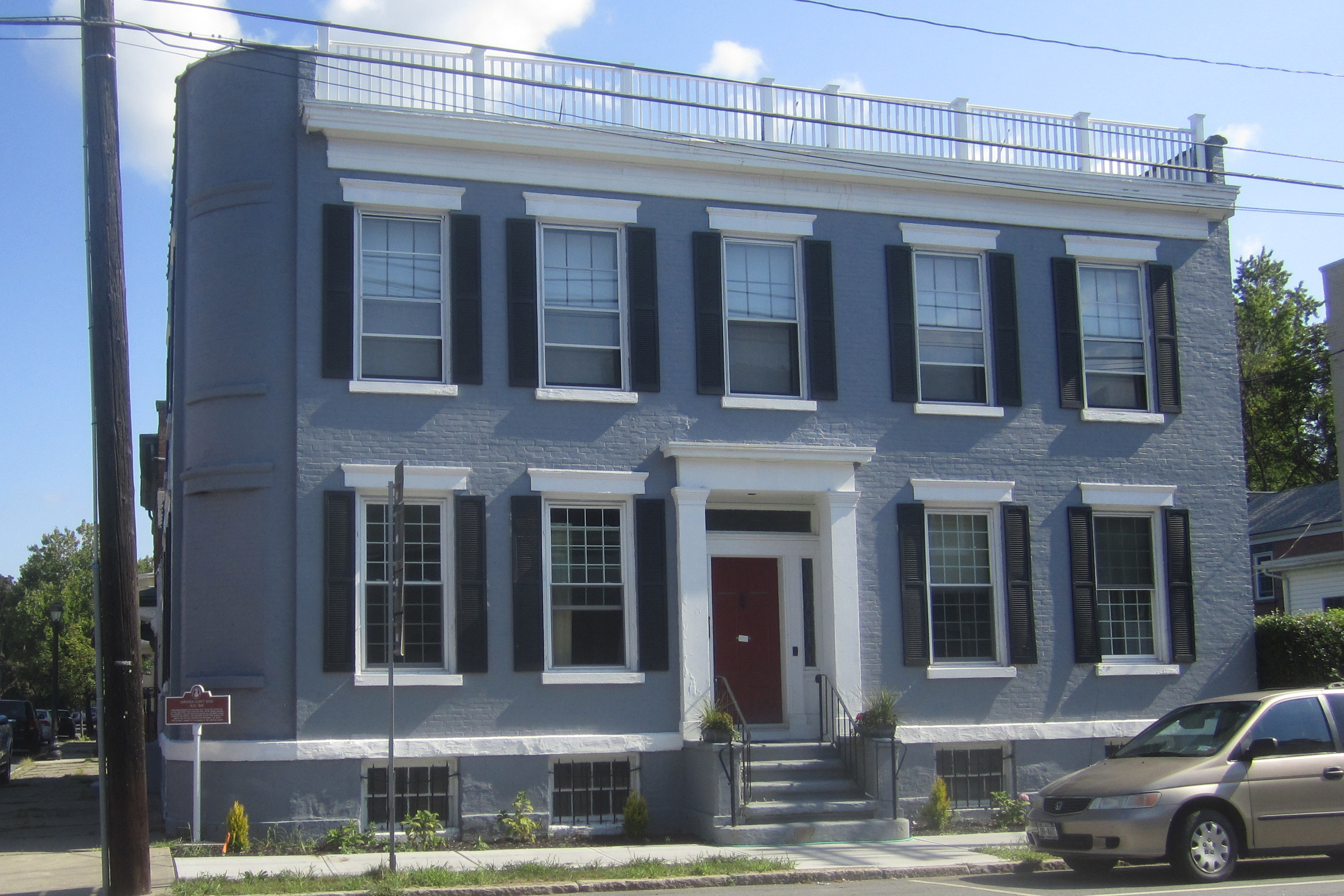
- Federal-style "Saratoga County Bank" building, 23 Broad Street, built 1842

- Location within New York Location within the United States
- Location: Roughly bounded by the Hudson River, Erie Canal, and State St., Waterford, New York
- Coordinates: 42°47′26″N 73°40′46″W
- Area: 31 acres (13 ha)
- Architect: Multiple
- Architectural style: Greek Revival, Late Victorian, Federal
- NRHP reference No.: 77000982
- Added to NRHP: July 14, 1977

Waterford Village Historic District is a 31-acre (13 ha) historic district in Waterford, New York that was listed on the National Register of Historic Places in 1977.

The district dates to 1799 and includes Greek Revival, Late Victorian, and Federal architecture.

The listing included 330 contributing buildings and one other contributing structure.

The village area is located at the junction of the Mohawk and Hudson Rivers. It was settled in 1633 and became the first incorporated village in the state in 1794. It is the southern terminus of the Champlain Canal and the eastern terminus of the Erie Canal.

== Gallery ==
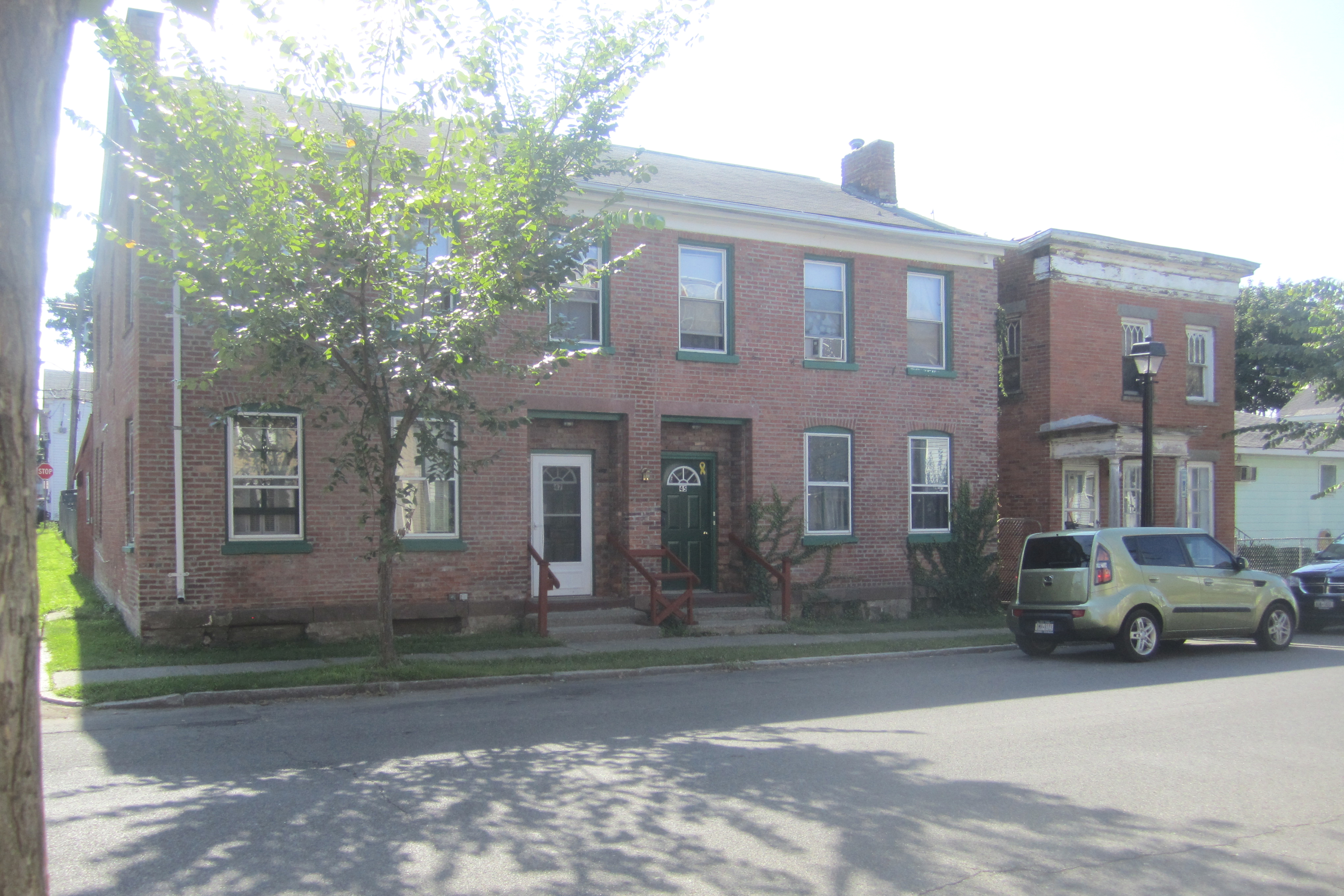

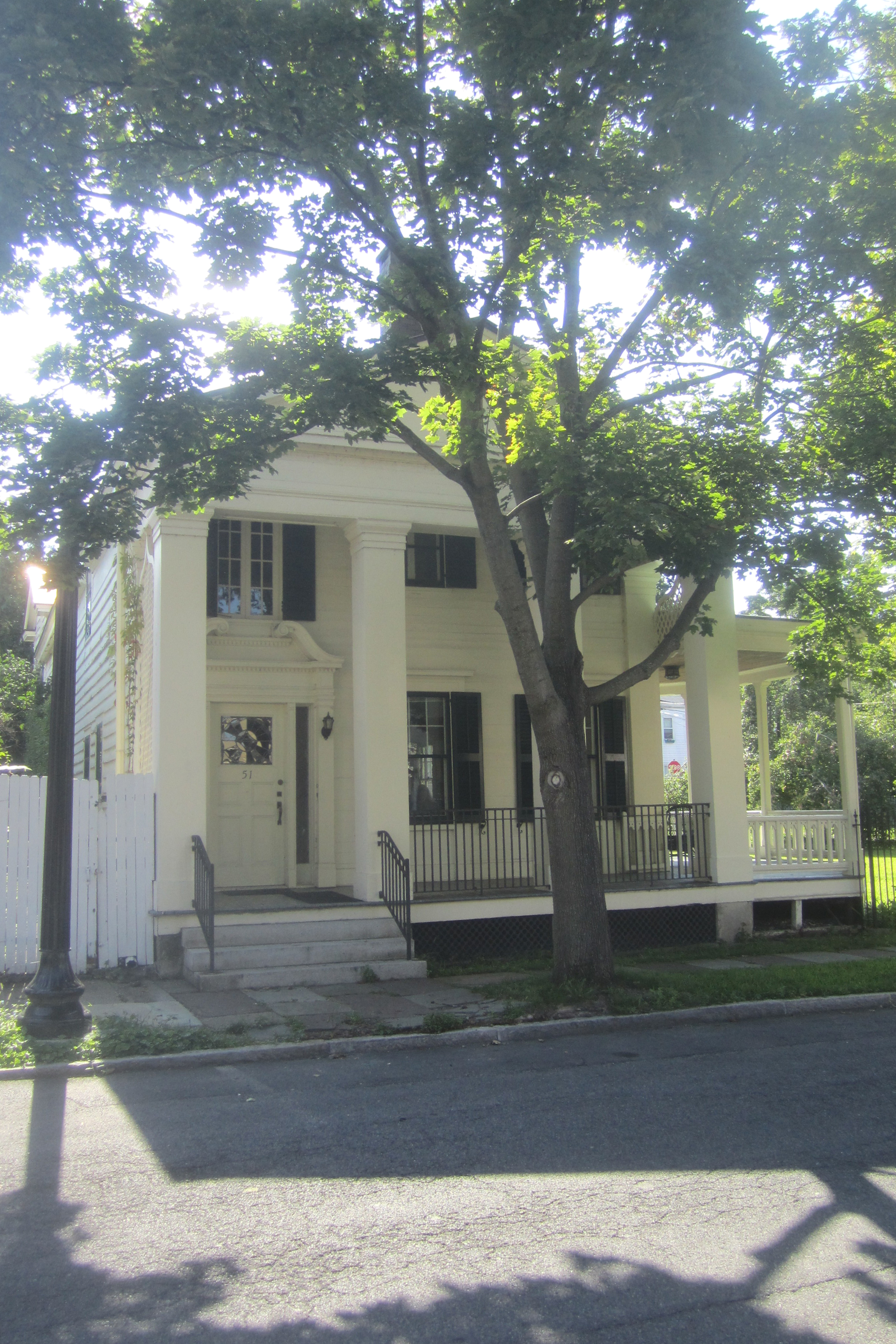
