= Waterford School =

Private school in Sandy, Utah, US

The Waterford School
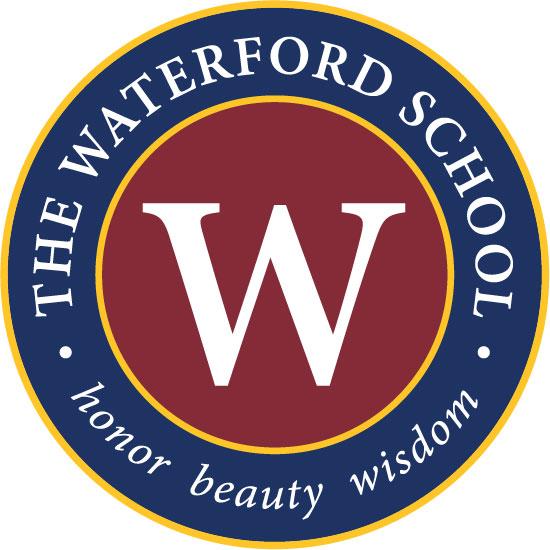

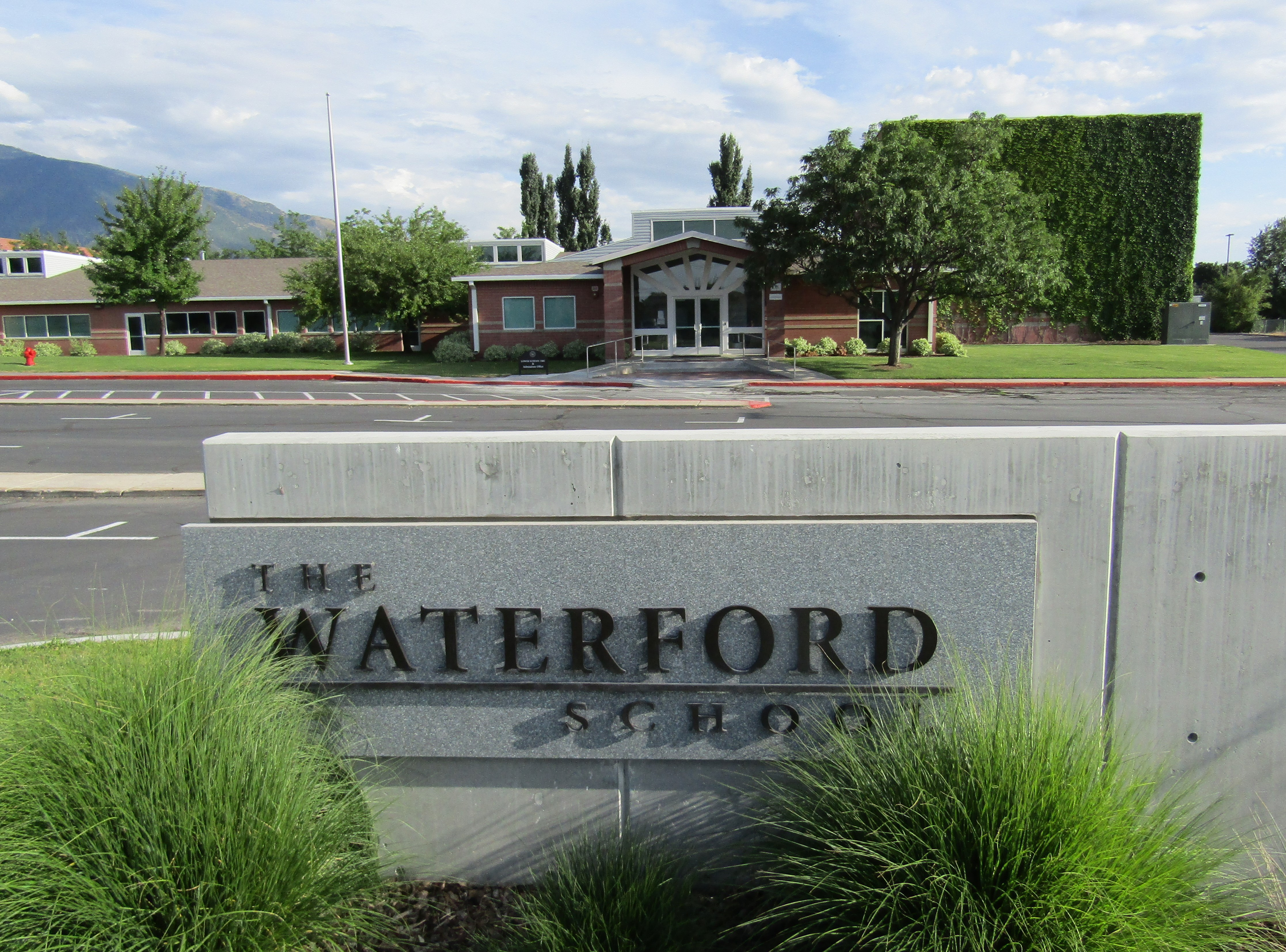

Location
- 1480 East 9400 South; Sandy, Utah 84093; United States

Information
- Type: Private, Coeducational
- Established: 1981
- Principal: Andrew Menke
- Grades: PreK–12
- Enrollment: 1074 (2024)
- Colors: Navy, Burgundy, Gold
- Mascot: Raven
- Accreditation: Northwest Accreditation Commission (NWAC), Northwest Association of Independent Schools (NWAIS)
- Tuition: $9,415-$31,345
- Website: waterfordschool.org

Waterford School is an independent school offering classes pre-k through grade twelve, located in Sandy, Utah, United States. Founded in 1981 by Nancy and Dustin Heuston, The Waterford School was originally established as a non-tuition, research school, pairing a classical liberal arts education with the benefits of the latest computer technology. In 1986, Waterford moved from its rented campus in Provo to a new campus in Sandy, where it's found today. Nancy Heuston served as the founding Head from 1981 to 2015. In 2015, Andrew Menke became the second Head of School.

== Description ==
In addition to academics, Waterford School has an arts program including photography, studio art, music and dance as well as a sports program which offers lacrosse, soccer, crew, basketball, volleyball, track, cross country, racquetball, tennis and golf. The school participates in the Utah High School Activities Association Division IIA. The school holds State Championship titles in men's lacrosse (2003, 2004, 2006), women's lacrosse (2011), men's soccer (2003, 2007, 2010, 2011, 2014, 2016, 2018), women's soccer (1994, 1996, 2006, 2008, 2011, 2012), men's basketball (2002), women's cross country (2004), men's tennis (2005, 2006, 2013, 2014, 2015, 2016, 2017, 2019), women's tennis (2000, 2002, 2003, 2009, 2016), and men's golf (1999, 2000, 2001, 2002, 2003, 2004). The school has won tens of hundreds of championships, and holds records in the Utah state for multiple sports. Many of the players on the teams have gone to national competitions.

In 2014, The Washington Post named Utah's Most Challenging School to be the Waterford School. According to the Post, the qualifications of the distinction of "America’s Most Challenging High Schools ranks schools through an index formula that’s a simple ratio: the number of Advanced Placement, International Baccalaureate and Advanced International Certificate of Education tests given at a school each year, divided by the number of seniors who graduated that year." The Deseret News reported from Todd Winters, Dean of Admissions at the Waterford School, "the staff and administration are delighted by the recognition. But he added that the rankings, like any evaluation of school performance, are based on a narrow set of criteria and do not necessarily tell a full story." The Deseret News additionally quoted Winters himself, saying, "'Our mission as a rigorous college preparatory school would draw students that are college bound and have high aspirations for doing college-level work while they’re in high school. I think in the end, ratings should be looked at very carefully as just that, it’s one index that pulls together one or two sources of data and conclusions are made.'"

The Waterford School is fully accredited by the Northwest Accreditation Commission (NWAC). It is also accredited by the Pacific Northwest Association of Independent Schools (PNAIS), and is a member of the National Association of Independent Schools (NAIS).

There have been a few notable students that have graduated from The Waterford School (e.g. Sawyer Brooks, a Nasa Robotics Engineer; Lorna Balfour, an Emmy Award-Winning producer; Patrick Randak, a professional photographer in New York City; and George Matus, creator and founder of Teal Drones.)

== See also ==
- List of high schools in Utah
