= Niskayuna Central School District =

School district in the U.S. state of New York

Address
- 1430 Balltown Road Schenectady, New York, 12309; United States

District information
- Type: Public
- Grades: K–12
- NCES District ID: 3620880

Students and staff
- Students: 4,229 (2020–2021)
- Teachers: 313.76 (on an FTE basis)
- Staff: 402.23 (on an FTE basis)
- Student–teacher ratio: 13.48:1

Other information
- Website: www.niskyschools.org

The Niskayuna Central School District is a public school district located in Niskayuna, New York. It has a total enrollment of 4,312 students in grades K–12 in 8 schools. Carl J. Mummenthey serves as superintendent of schools (2022- present). Prior leaders include Cosimo Tangorra (2015-2021), Susan Kay Salvaggio (2011-2014), Kevin Baughman (2002-2011) and J. Briggs McAndrews (1992-2002). Baughman held the prestigious note of being the second-highest school administrator in the State of NY, making over $200,000, nearly double the salary of the Governor. The district primarily serves the Town of Niskayuna, but also covers a small section of the Town of Colonie, the Alplaus area of the Town of Glenville and the Rexford area of the Town of Clifton Park, both north of the Mohawk River.

== Schools ==
- Birchwood Elementary School - 897 Birchwood Ln, Niskayuna, NY 12309

Serves the southeastern portion of Niskayuna, generally east of Pearse Rd., and the small part of the district that extends into Colonie.

- Craig Elementary School - 2566 Balltown Rd, Niskayuna, NY 12309

Serves areas south and west of GE Global Research. The area is centered on Rt. 146/Providence/River Roads.

- Glencliff Elementary School - 961 Riverview Rd, Rexford, NY 12148

Located in Town of Clifton Park.
Serves Aqueduct area, Rexford (Clifton Park) area west of Appleton Rd., and a portion of East Glenville, Alplaus, near Glenridge Rd. and Maple Ave.

- Hillside Elementary School - 1100 Cornelius Ave, Niskayuna, NY 12309

Serves the Niskayuna CDP area - west of the Schenectady city line and east of Balltown Rd.

- Rosendale Elementary School - 2445 Rosendale Rd, Niskayuna, NY 12309

Serves the area north of Rt. 7 and sandwiched between the Mohawk Golf Club and Mohawk River State Park.

- Iroquois Middle School - 2495 Rosendale Rd, Niskayuna, NY 12309

Serves grades 7-8

- Van Antwerp Middle School - 2253 Story Ave, Niskayuna, NY 12309

Serves grade 6.

- Niskayuna High School - 1626 Balltown Rd, Niskayuna, NY 12309.

== Construction ==
In 2007, and an ongoing project starting in 2022, Niskayuna High School and other Elementary schools began a district-wide construction project to increase the quality of the environment to which students are exposed.

- The High School, the biggest of the district projects, added a new Media Center and the extension of C-Hall. A new Geo-Thermal Heating system in the wing enrollment of students.
- Iroquois Middle School replaced old windows with permanent moisture trapped inside the two panes of the window. Iroquois added 20 classrooms and removed the tennis court and put in a parking lot, a new bus circle, and connecting it with Rosendale to improve the flow of traffic.
