= Garrett Whitley =

Garrett Whitley may refer to:

- Garrett Whitley (baseball) (born 1997), baseball player
- Garrett Whitley (Shortland Street), a fictional character on New Zealand soap opera Shortland Street
