= Abraham Best House =

Historic house in New York, United States

- U.S. National Register of Historic Places
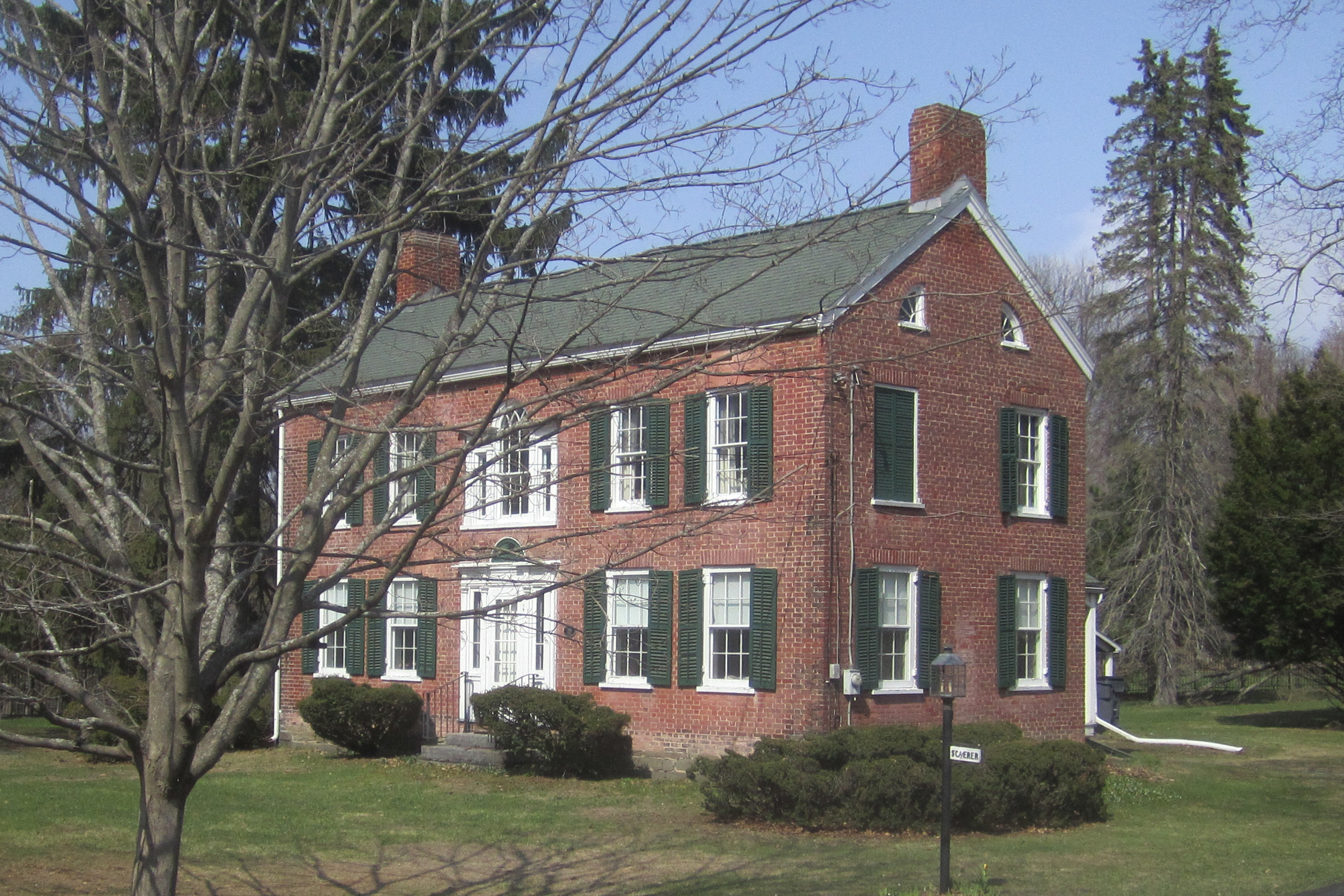
- Abraham Best House, April 2015

- Location within New York Location within the United States
- Interactive map showing the location for Abraham Best House
- Location: 113 Vischer Ferry Rd., near Vischer Ferry, New York
- Coordinates: 42°48′44″N 73°49′34″W
- Area: 3.0 acres (1.2 ha)
- Built: c. 1815, c. 1900
- Built by: Harder, John
- Architectural style: Federal
- NRHP reference No.: 11000452
- Added to NRHP: July 14, 2011

The Abraham Best House is a historic house located at 113 Vischer Ferry Road near Vischer Ferry, Saratoga County, New York.

== Description and history ==
It was built in about 1815 by Abraham and Harriet Best of Claverack, Columbia County, and is a two-story, five-bay wide, Federal style brick dwelling. It has a 1 1/2-story rear kitchen ell. The house sits on a limestone foundation and the front block has a side gable roof and interior end chimneys. The house was renovated in the 1940s. The front facade features a Palladian window on the second floor over the main entry. Also on the property is a contributing barn (c. 1900).

It was listed on the National Register of Historic Places on July 14, 2011.
