= Niska Isle =

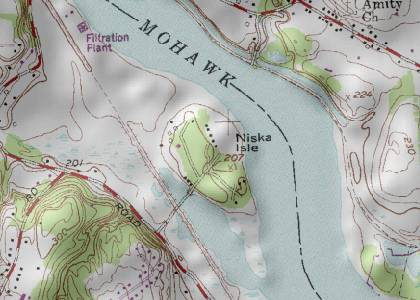
- Map of Niska Isle
- Interactive map of Niska Isle

Geography
- Location: Mohawk River
- Coordinates: 42°47′24″N 73°50′02″W
- Highest elevation: 207 ft (63.1 m)

Administration
- United States
- Town: Niskayuna, New York

Niska Isle, despite its name, is not an island, but a peninsula in the town of Niskayuna, New York. Niska Isle is along the Mohawk River's south shore, with a back bay and swamp that surrounds it to the south.

== History ==
Niska Isle was prior to 1915 a .5 mi (0.80 km) by .25 mi (0.40 km) highly defensible hillock at the junction of the Lisha Kill (creek) and Mohawk River and was once the site of a Native American village. A trail led from the village to the Normans Kill and Helderberg Escarpment. A rope ferry was started in 1790, by Eldert Vischer, connecting Ferry Road on the Niskayuna side to the Ferry Road on the opposite bank. The ferry was replaced by a short-lived bridge from 1900–2. The damming of the Mohawk River for the creation of the New York State Barge Canal in 1915 caused the mouth of the Lisha Kill to become a back bay and this required the building of a bridge to connect Ferry Road to the "mainland". The bridge, despite getting a new deck in the 1980s, was showing its age by 2008, when it was proposed that Niska Isle be abandoned. This was rejected due to a projected price tag of over $6 million to buy out the landowners. A new bridge, costing almost as much, was built in 2010.

== Demographics ==
Niska Isle is home to roughly nine households. Most of the peninsula is home to two families, the Schoolcrafts and the Burgers. The Schoolcrafts, who occupy most of the land south and east of Ferry Road, have been there on a resident basis since 1937, although they owned land as early as the early 20th century. The Burgers have been residents since 1947 on most of the land north of the road to Lock 7, though they worked and later rented the land starting in the late 19th century. Some other families live in houses overlooking the Ferry Road bridge.

== Geography ==
To the north and east of Niska Isle is the Mohawk River, which separates it from the hamlet of Vischer Ferry in Saratoga County. A back bay is to the south. The Lisha Kill empties into this bay, which tends to be clogged with water chestnuts, an invasive plant species. The Mohawk tends to get clogged with ice jams during the winter and flooding on the island is common, with an especially severe flood occurring in the 1980s.

== Transportation ==
The only land access to Niska Isle is by way of a bridge that carries Ferry Road over an abandoned railroad bed (now the Mohawk Hudson Hike/Bike Trail) and the back bay. The original bridge was a one-lane bridge built around 1915, due to the construction of the Barge Canal that flooded the mouth of the Lisha Kill and cut off Niska Isle from the "mainland". Because the Mohawk River is part of the Barge Canal, the bridge was owned by the New York State Canal Corporation (and later New York State Thruway Authority and then the New York State Department of Transportation). The deck was replaced in the 1980s and the bridge replaced in 2010 with a new 588-foot-long (179 m) bridge.

== Recreation ==
A small parking area is at the end of Ferry Road at the river's edge and allows for access for fishing and a boat launch. Fish off Niska Isle include bass, pike, muskie, panfish, and 20–30 pounder carp.
