= Rosendale Common School =

- U.S. National Register of Historic Places
- Location within New York Location within the United States
- Location: 2572 Rosendale Rd., Niskayuna, New York
- Coordinates: 42°47′46″N 73°51′31″W
- Area: 0.36 acres (0.15 ha)
- Built: c. 1850
- NRHP reference No.: 10000482
- Added to NRHP: July 19, 2010

Rosendale Common School, also known as Niskayuna Grange Hall No. 1542, is a historic school building located in the vicinity of Niskayuna in Schenectady County, New York. It was built about 1850 and is a 1 1/2-story, three-by-five-bay, timber-frame building on a limestone foundation. It has a steeply pitched gable roof and a one-story, shed-roof addition from the 1960s. The building was used as a school until 1948, when it was sold to the local Grange for use as their clubhouse.

It was added to the National Register of Historic Places in 2010.
