= Aqueduct, New York =

Hamlet in Niskayuna, Schenectady County, New York

Coordinates: 42.848282°N 73.888718°W

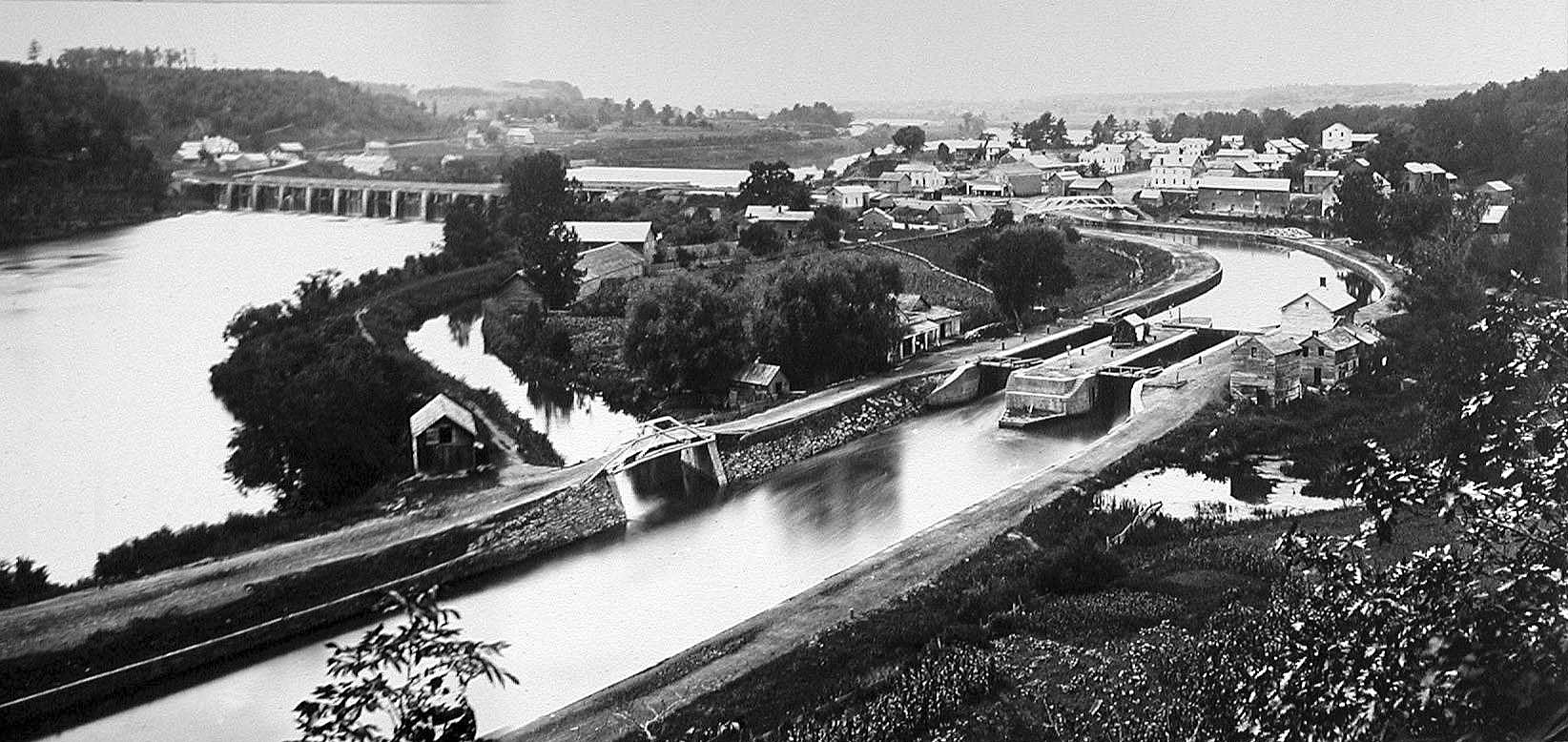
The Rexford Aqueduct, carrying the Erie Canal over the Mohawk River. Facing southwest from Clifton Park.

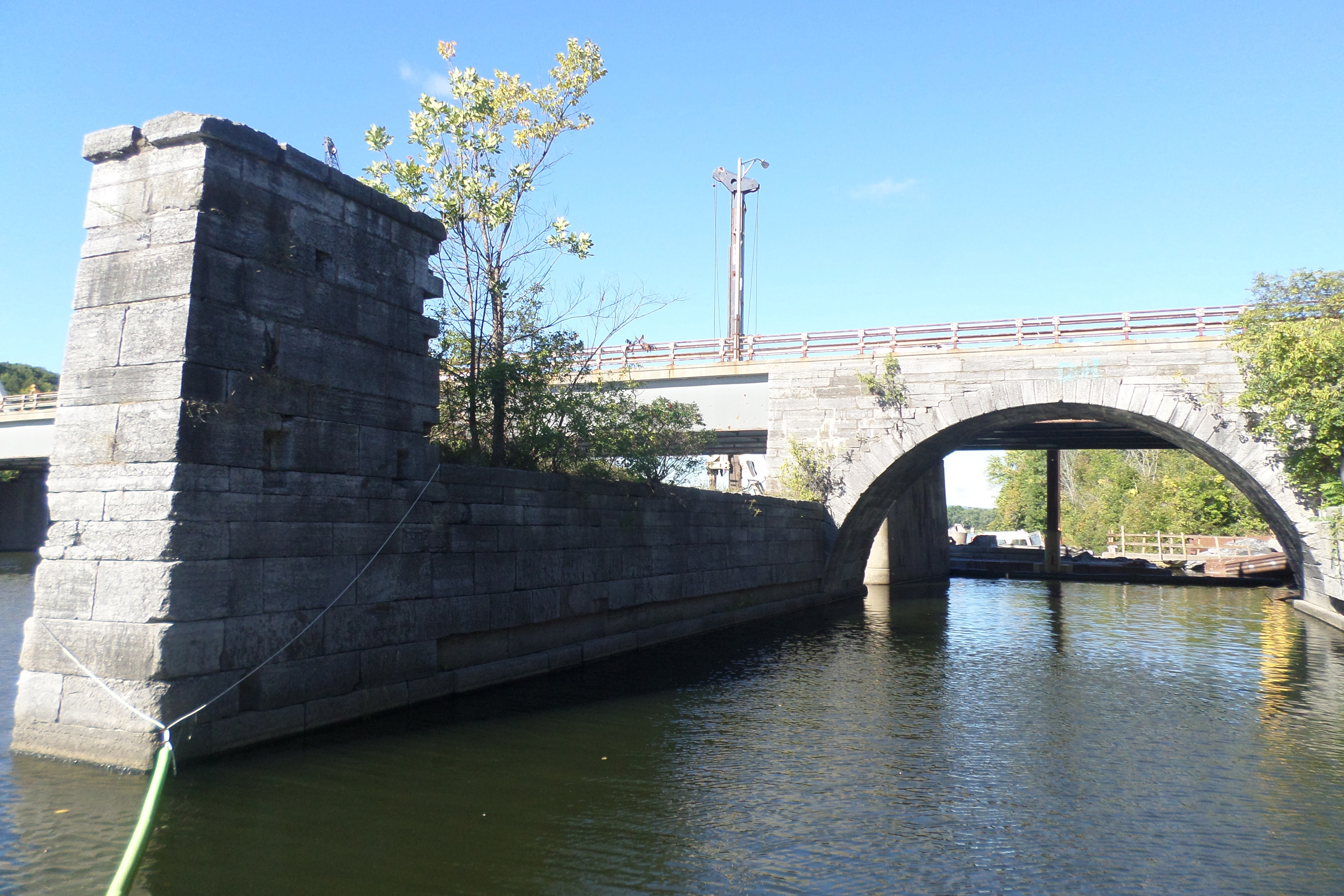
Remnant of the aqueduct, on the Rexford side.

Aqueduct is a hamlet in the Town of Niskayuna, Schenectady County, New York, United States. Its center is at the south end of the bridge of New York State Route 146 (Balltown Road) over the Mohawk River, that connects Schenectady County to the south and Saratoga County to the north. It was formerly a transportation hub. Alexander's Bridge across the Mohawk (see the map) antedated the Aqueduct. A new Route 146 steel highway bridge, with board pavement, parallel to the Aqueduct was built in the early 20th century. A Schenectady trolley line ended there, the line also serving Luna Park, just over the river in Rexford. There was, in Aqueduct, a staffed station of the Troy & Schenectady Railroad, which operated from 1841 to 1932.

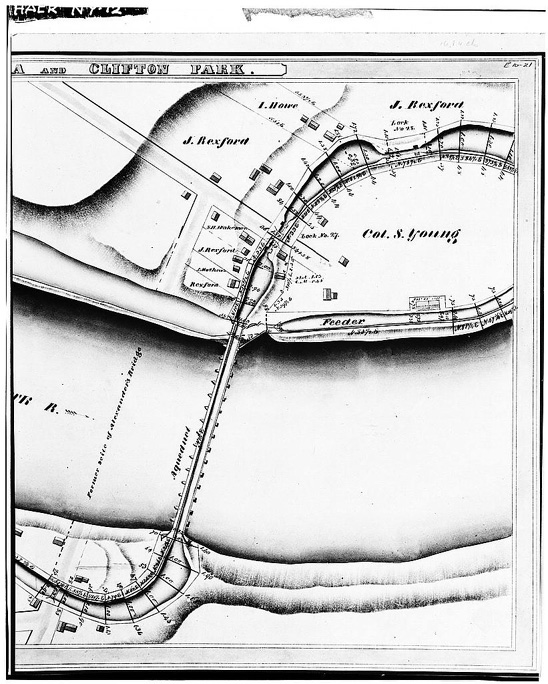
The Erie Canal aqueduct between Rexford and Schenectady, New York

The navigable aqueduct which gave the name was not part of a water supply. It was, rather, the water bridge that allowed boats on the Erie Canal, and the mules towing them, to cross over the Mohawk River, which ran beneath the water bridge or aqueduct. The aqueduct then continued westward along what is today Aqueduct Street, into downtown Schenectady. The original aqueduct, built in 1828, was of timber (logs). Built and replaced before photography, no visual image of it exists. It was replaced in 1842 with a masonry aqueduct. Pictures of this aqueduct were frequently used in Erie Canal publicity, and on post cards and calendars. Most of the aqueduct bridge was town down in 1918, when the New York State Barge Canal replaced the Erie Canal. A remnant exists in Rexford.

== See also ==
- Mohawk Towpath Scenic Byway
