= Nathan Garnsey House =

Historic house in New York, United States

- U.S. National Register of Historic Places
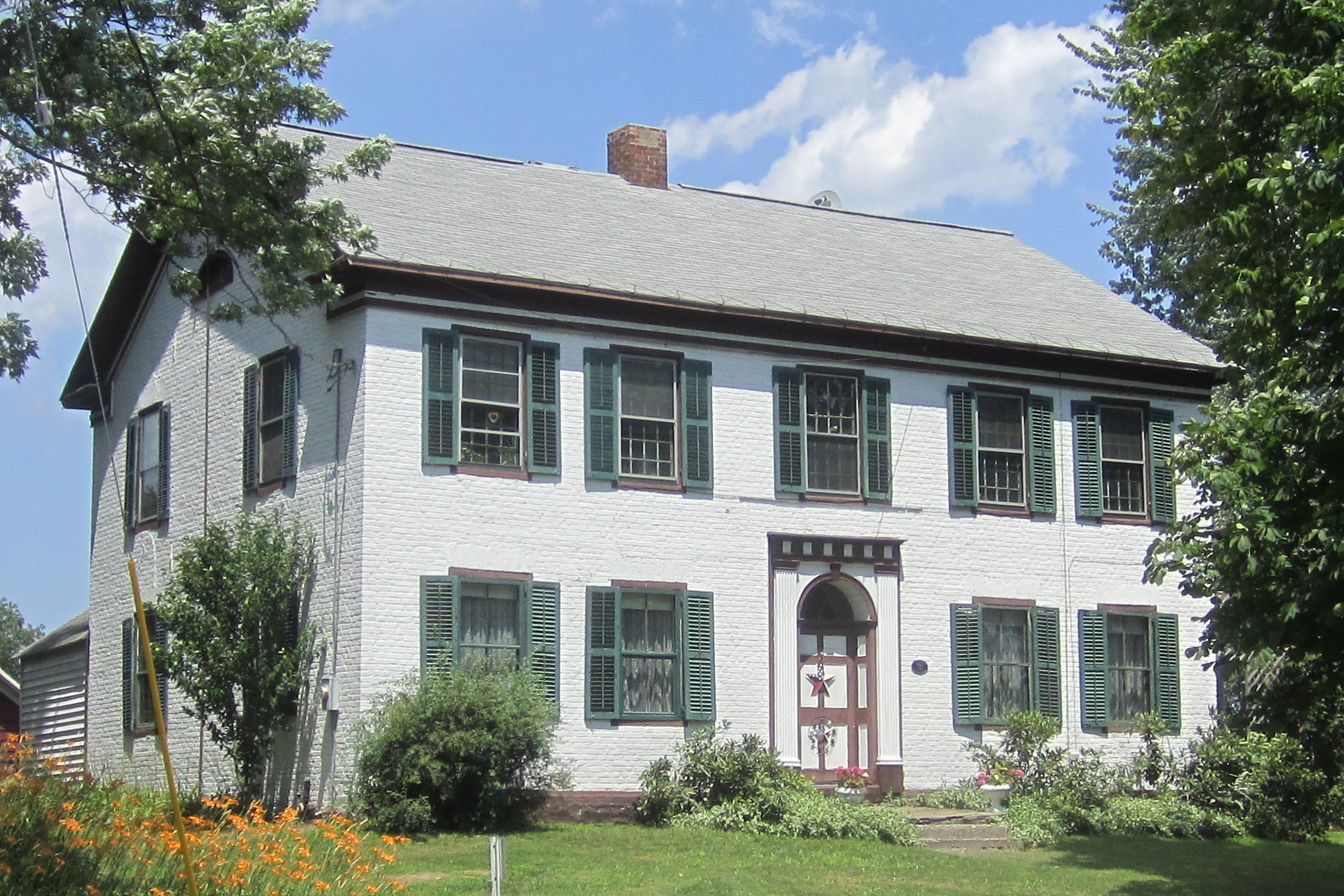
- Nathan Garnsey House, July 2013

- Location within New York Location within the United States
- Location: 1453 NY 146, near Rexford, New York
- Coordinates: 42°52′07″N 73°51′57″W
- Area: 3.0 acres (1.2 ha)
- Built: 1789, c. 1850
- Built by: Robbins, Jehiel
- Architectural style: Federal
- NRHP reference No.: 11001025
- Added to NRHP: January 12, 2012

Nathan Garnsey House is a historic home located near Rexford, Saratoga County, New York. It was built in 1789, and is a two-story, five-bay, double-pile, Federal style brick dwelling painted white. The house sits on a limestone foundation, has a side-gable roof, and a central chimney. The house features two small rear additions. Additionally, there is a contributing barn on the property, dated around 1850.

It was listed on the National Register of Historic Places in 2012.
