= André Davis =

American football player (born 1979)

No. 87, 18, 11
- Position: Wide receiver / kick returner

Personal information
- Born: June 12, 1979 (age 47); Niskayuna, New York, U.S.
- Listed height: 6 ft 1 in (1.85 m)
- Listed weight: 195 lb (88 kg)

Career information
- High school: Niskayuna
- College: Virginia Tech
- NFL draft: 2002: 2nd round, 47th overall pick

Career history
- Cleveland Browns (2002–2004); New England Patriots (2005); Buffalo Bills (2006); Houston Texans (2007–2010)

Awards and highlights
- PFWA All-Rookie Team (2002); First-team All-American (2000); NFL record: Longest receiving touchdown: 99 yards (tied)

Career NFL statistics
- Receptions: 156
- Receiving yards: 2,470
- Receiving touchdowns: 17
- Return yards: 4,861
- Return touchdowns: 4
- Stats at Pro Football Reference

André N. Davis (born June 12, 1979) is an American former professional football player who was a wide receiver and kick returner in the National Football League (NFL). He played college football for the Virginia Tech, earning first-team All-American honors in 2000. He was selected by the Cleveland Browns in the second round of the 2002 NFL draft. Davis also played for the New England Patriots, Buffalo Bills and Houston Texans in his career. While playing for Virginia Tech Davis appeared on the cover of Sports Illustrated.

== Early life ==
Davis was the star on the Niskayuna High School track and field team, where he also played soccer. He did not begin playing football until his junior year.

== College career ==
Davis accepted a football scholarship from Virginia Tech, where he was a teammate of Michael Vick. He scored the first touchdown for the Hokies in the 2000 Sugar Bowl game against Florida State, despite falling 46–29. He was awarded the Today's Top VIII Award as a member of the Class of 2002. For his college accomplishments, he was enshrined in the Virginia Tech Sports Hall of Fame.

== Professional career ==
Davis was drafted by the Cleveland Browns in the second round of the 2002 NFL draft. Cleveland also selected Andra Davis in fifth round of that draft, requiring each player to have their full name on the back of their jersey. During his first three seasons in Cleveland, he played wide receiver and on special teams. Davis scored on a 99-yard touchdown reception during a game on October 17, 2004, against the Cincinnati Bengals. The reception ties Davis with twelve other players for the NFL record for longest career reception.

Davis spent 2005 and 2006 with the New England Patriots and Buffalo Bills respectively. He was then signed by the Houston Texans for a one-year deal in 2007. Davis started for the Texans, replacing an injured Andre Johnson in Week 3 of the 2007 NFL season. He scored his first touchdown for the Texans on October 1, 2007 - Week 4 - against the Atlanta Falcons (35-yard touchdown reception). Davis took over for an injured Jerome Mathis as a kick returner. On December 30, in the last game of the 2007 regular season against the Jacksonville Jaguars, Davis scored two consecutive touchdowns on kickoff returns, the first for 97 yards and the second for 104.

It was reported February 28, 2008, that the Texans had reached an agreement with Davis to stay on the team. He received $16 million over four years, with $8 million guaranteed.

On February 18, 2011, the Texans released Davis.

=== NFL records ===
- Longest touchdown reception: 99 (2004 vs Cincinnati Bengals) (tied with 12 others)
- Most kickoff return touchdowns in a single game: 2 (2007 vs Jacksonville Jaguars) (tied with 9 others)

=== Texans franchise records ===
- Most career kickoff return yards (2,473)
- Most career kickoff return touchdowns (3) (tied with Jerome Mathis)
- Longest kickoff return touchdown: 104 (2007)
- Most Kickoff Return Touchdowns: 3 (2007)
- Kickoff Return Average (season): 30.3 (2007)
- Receiving Average (Minimum 32 Receptions) (season): 17.7 (2007)

== NFL career statistics ==
Legend
	Led the league
**Bold**	Career high

=== Regular season ===
Year	Team	Games		Receiving					
Year	Team	GP	GS	Tgt	Rec	Yds	Avg	Lng	TD
2002	CLE	**16**	4	**72**	37	420	11.4	31	**6**
2003	CLE	**16**	**8**	62	**40**	576	14.4	49	5
2004	CLE	7	7	35	16	416	**26.0**	**99**	2
2005	NE	9	4	24	9	190	21.1	60	1
2006	BUF	**16**	1	7	2	13	6.5	8	0
2007	HOU	14	**8**	63	33	**583**	17.7	53	3
2008	HOU	12	0	28	13	213	16.4	49	0
2009	HOU	14	1	11	6	59	9.8	21	0
		104	33	302	156	2,470	15.8	99	17

=== Playoffs ===
Year	Team	Games		Receiving					
Year	Team	GP	GS	Tgt	Rec	Yds	Avg	Lng	TD
2002	CLE	1	**1**	-	**2**	**65**	**32.5**	43	**1**
2005	NE	**2**	0	**4**	**2**	54	27.0	**51**	0
		3	1	4	4	119	29.8	51	1

== Personal life ==
His cousin is Cam Brown who played football for Penn State and for the Miami Dolphins.

== See also ==
- List of NCAA major college football yearly receiving leaders
