= Cyrus Rexford House =

Historic house in New York, United States

- U.S. National Register of Historic Places
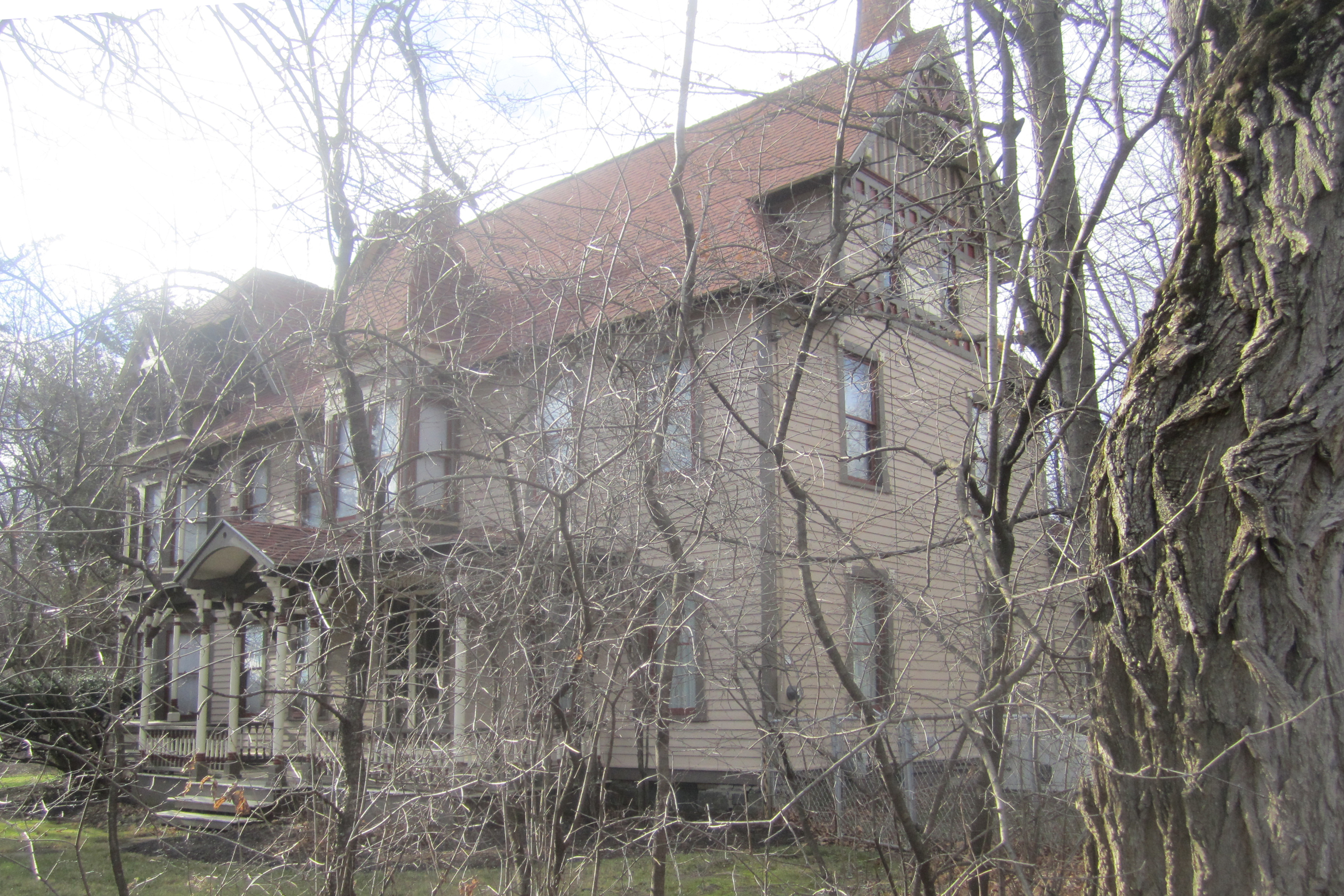
- Cyrus Rexford House, December 2015

- Location within New York Location within the United States
- Location: 1643 NY 146, Rexford, New York
- Coordinates: 42°51′20″N 73°53′21″W
- Area: 2.23 acres (0.90 ha)
- Built: c. 1850, 1883, 1910
- Architectural style: Stick Style
- NRHP reference No.: 10001135
- Added to NRHP: January 14, 2011

Cyrus Rexford House is a historic home located at Rexford, Saratoga County, New York. It consists of a three-story, Stick style main block built in 1883, with a 1 1/2-story rear block built about 1850. It also has a one-story rear ell. The main block has a steeply pitched hipped roof with bracketed overhang. The house features an elaborate mix of decorative detailing and polychrome paint scheme. Also on the property are the contributing carriage house and gambrel roofed barn.

It was listed on the National Register of Historic Places in 2011.
