= Rexford, New York =

Rexford
- hamlet
- Location within the state of New York
- Coordinates: 42°51′11″N 73°53′18″W
- Country: United States
- State: New York
- County: Saratoga
- Time zone: UTC-5 (Eastern (EST))
  - Summer (DST): UTC-4 (EDT)

Rexford is a hamlet in Saratoga County, New York, United States, located on the north bank of the Mohawk River. Rexford is in the Town of Clifton Park, near the southwestern town line. Its boundaries, like those of neighboring Alplaus, are unofficial and necessarily ambiguous. To the south, it is bounded by the Mohawk River and Grooms Road and to the west, Alplaus and the Schenectady County line. Route 146 (Balltown Road) and Vischer's Ferry Road, are probably a reasonable delineations of its northern and eastern boundaries. The ZIP Code is 12148.

== History ==
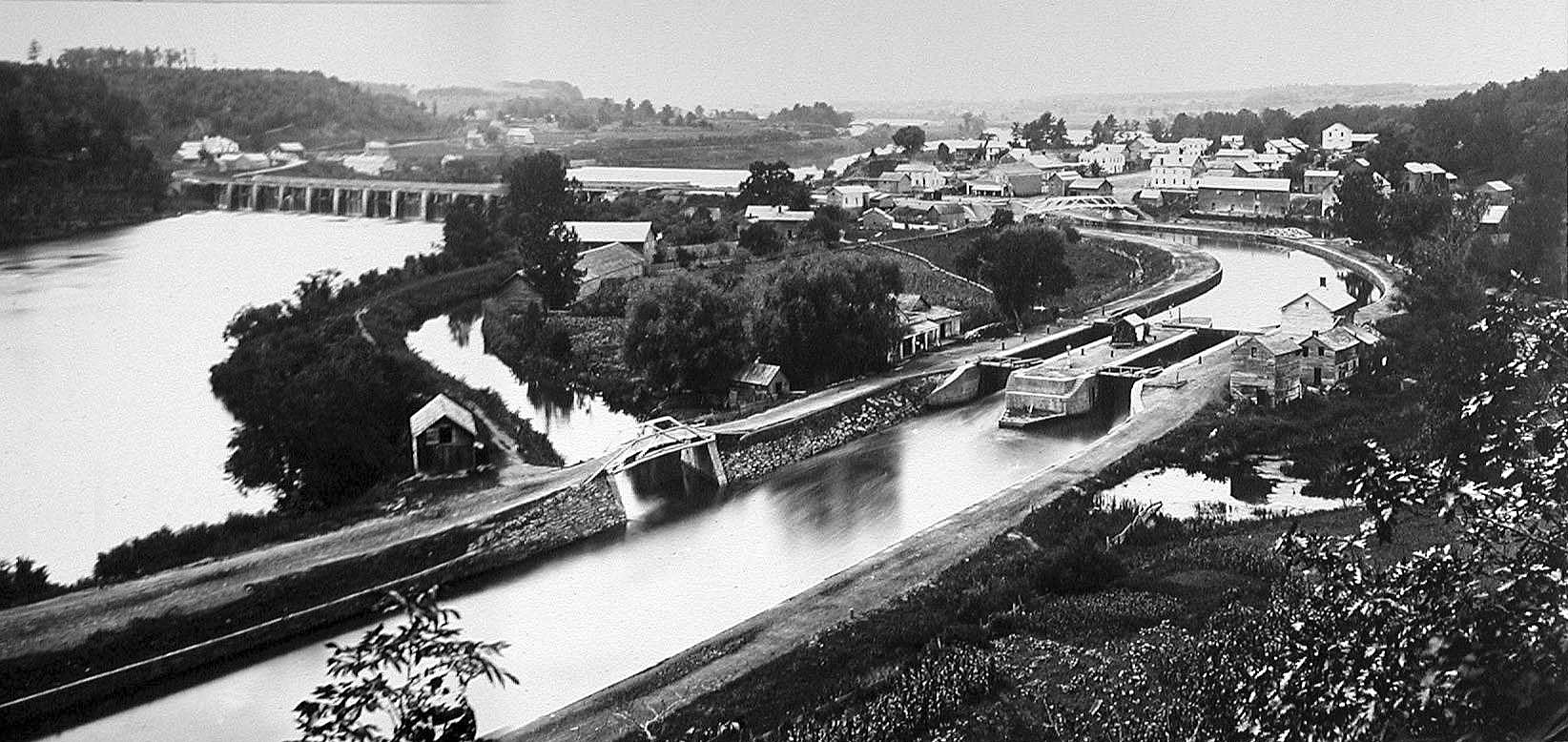
This photo shows the earlier years of the Erie Canal as its stone aqueduct passes over the Mohawk River through Rexford.

Edward Rexford called the area Rexford Flats. The Methodist Church at 18 Main St. was built in 1839. There is a blacksmith shop across from the church which dates back to that same era, the time of the Erie Canal.

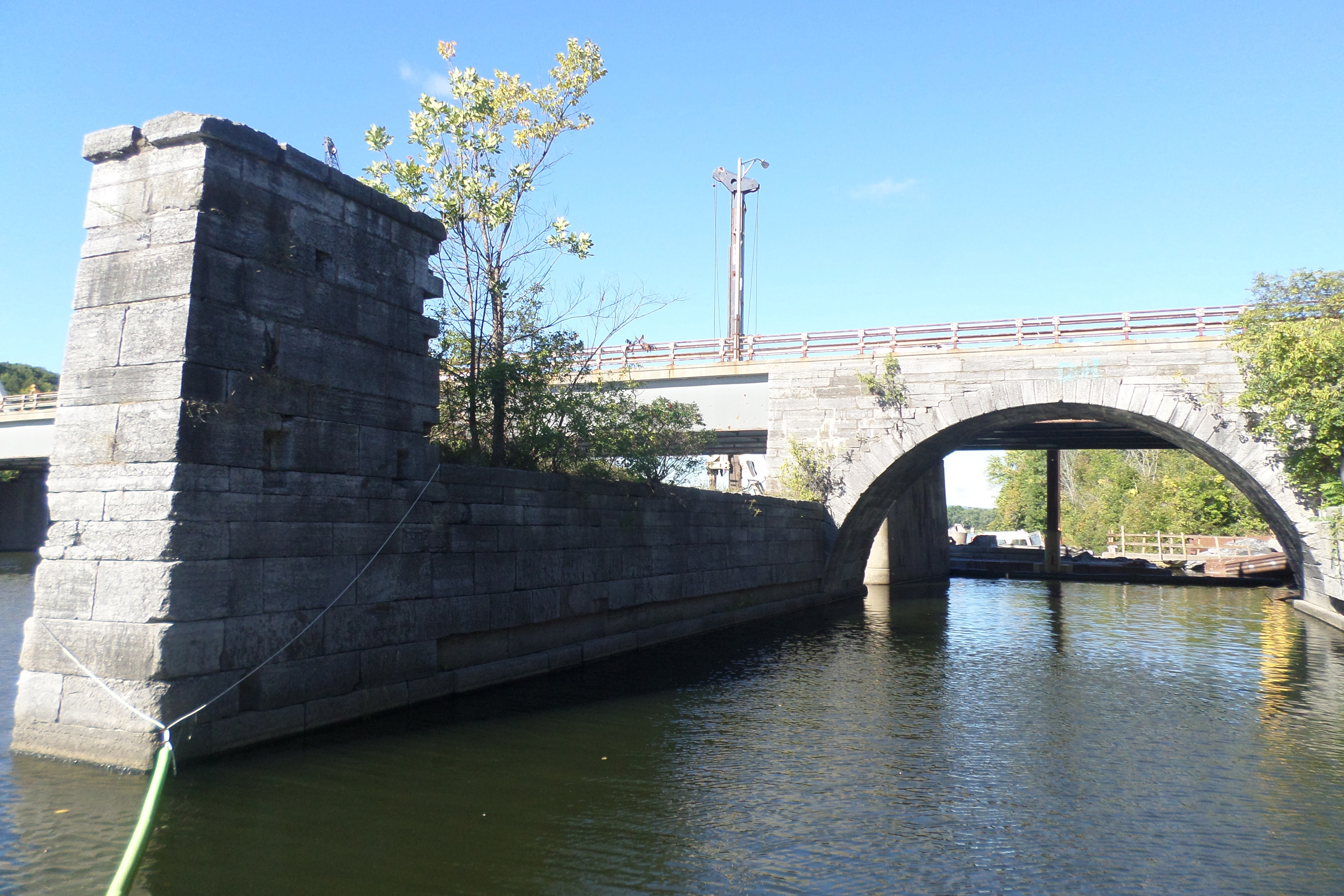
Remains of the Rexford Aqueduct in 2016

Rexford was the site of an aqueduct that brought vessels traveling the Erie Canal across the Mohawk River. The aqueduct was built in 1841. Large arches which supported its towpath can still be seen from the Route 146 bridge crossing the river today.

The Schenectady Yacht Club is located in a former canal store, built circa 1900. The Club uses the remains of Lock 21, which is on its grounds, for moving boats in and out of the river. Lock 21 was built in 1842 as part of an enlargement of the Canal.

Rexford once had a 2-room schoolhouse, located at the corner of Riverview and what is now Route 146. This was razed in the 1960s and replaced by a firehouse, which was replaced by a Stewart's convenience store in 2001. The firehouse is now located north of the intersection on Route 146.

In the early 1900s, there was an amusement park at Rexford with rides, games, and refreshments. It was the end of a trolley line, a little excursion from the city of Schenectady. The park was known as Luna Park, Dolle's Park, Colonnade Park, Palisades Park, and Rexford Park.

The McLane Hotel, razed in 1964, was a stop for stagecoaches and canal boats. John McLane operated it until about 1930. Before its demise the McLane was a mysterious-looking, old-fashioned and extremely weathered building with large galleries on both floors and a cupola at its peak.

== Notable locations ==
- Glencliff Elementary School, Niskayuna School District; 961 Riverview Road, Rexford, New York, 12148 (Most of the Niskayuna School District lies within Schenectady County.)
- Schenectady Yacht Club, 1676 Route 146, Rexford, NY 12148
- The Edison Club is a country club that was formed in 1904 by employees of the General Electric Company's Test Dept. The Edison's Rexford Clubhouse opened 2 July 1925. It has a 27-hole golf course.
- Cyrus Rexford House, listed on the National Register of Historic Places in 2011.
- Nathan Garnsey House, listed on the National Register of Historic Places in 2012.

== Notable people ==
- Ian Anderson (b. 1998), pitcher for the Atlanta Braves

== See also ==
- Aqueduct, New York
