= Vischer Ferry, New York =

Vischer Ferry
- hamlet
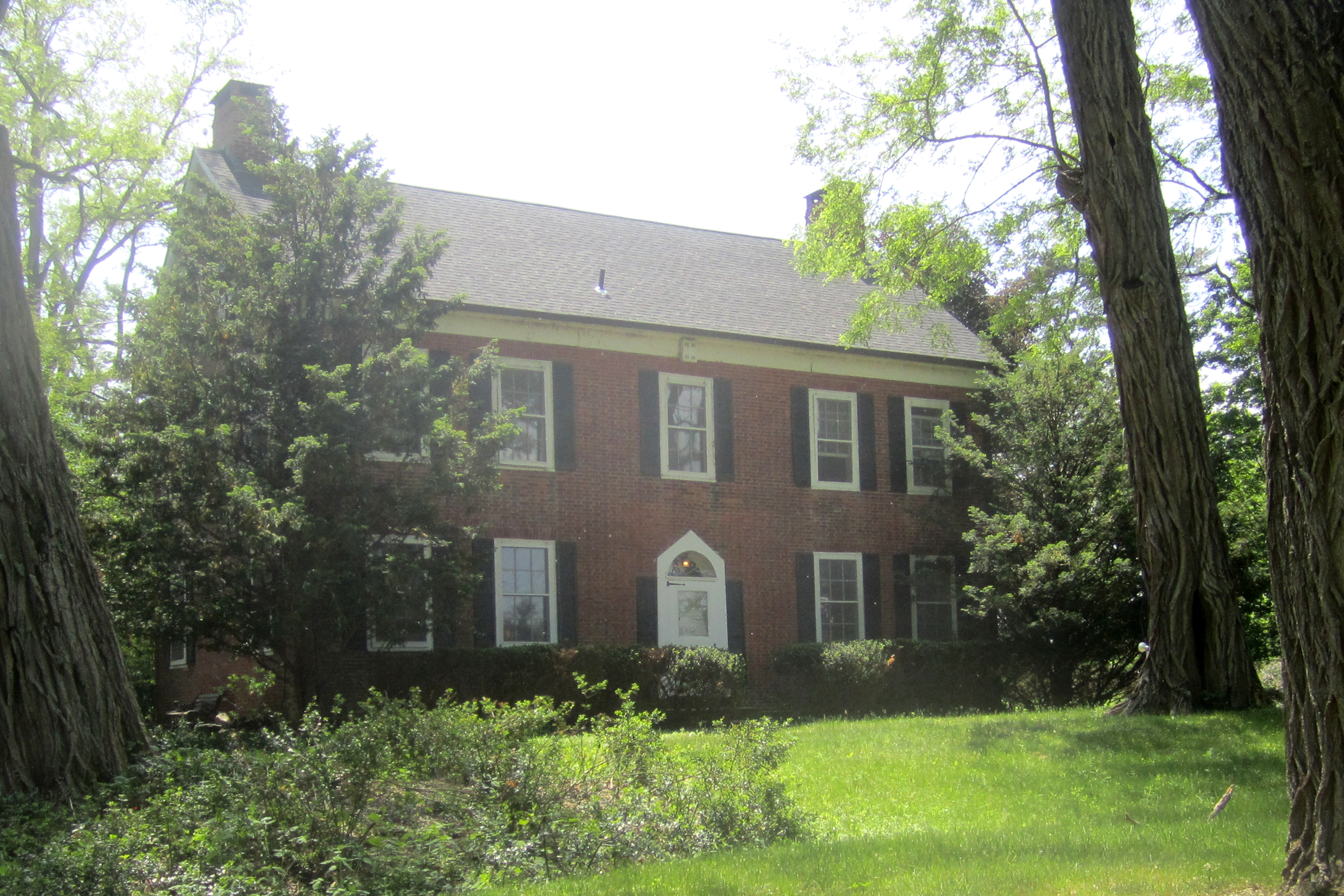
- Nicholas and Eldert Vischer House

- Location of Vischer Ferry within the state of New York
- Coordinates: 42°47′50″N 73°49′42″W
- Country: United States
- State: New York
- Region: Capital District
- County: Saratoga
- Settled: 1670
- Elevation: 213 ft (65 m)
- Time zone: UTC-5 (EST)
  - Summer (DST): UTC-4 (EDT)
- ZIP Code: 12148 (Rexford)
- Area code: 518

Vischer Ferry is a hamlet in the town of Clifton Park in Saratoga County, New York, United States, along the Mohawk River.

== History ==
Vischer Ferry is named for the family of Nicholas Vischer, who built a house beside the river in 1735. At that time the Mohawk Valley was claimed by the Iroquois League and by the British Province of New York. The American Revolutionary War destroyed Iroquois settlements in the valley and established the State of New York.

The site became known as Vischer's Ferry after Nicholas Vischer's son, Eldert Vischer, opened a rope ferry at the site in 1790. The ferry connected Ferry Drive on the north shore to Ferry Road on the opposite bank at Niska Isle. By 1800, a tavern and store were located there. Construction of the Erie Canal by 1825 linked the Mohawk River to Lake Erie.

As the canal declined in importance, Vischer Ferry became relatively isolated. A bridge built across the river at Vischer Ferry in 1900 was destroyed by ice in 1902. Later attempts to secure state funding for a bridge were unsuccessful. Because of its isolation, the village preserved much of its nineteenth-century Greek Revival character. In October 1975 the Vischer Ferry Historic District was added to the National Register of Historic Places. The Abraham Best House was added in 2011.

A nearby concrete dam was completed in 1913 for hydroelectric use and to aid river navigation. Owned by New York Power Authority, the Vischer Ferry Dam, also known as Dam 3, is 30 feet (9.1 m) high and 1,919 feet (585 m) long.

The Vischer Ferry Hotel, built in the 1790s, was destroyed by fire in 1946. This loss led to the formation of the community's first volunteer fire department.

In 1958-1959, construction of an interchange on Vischer Ferry Road (County Road 90) linked Vischer Ferry to Interstate 87, which is called the "Northway" between Albany and the Canada–US border.

== Recreation ==
The 600-acre (2.4 km^{2}) Vischer Ferry Nature and Historic Preserve features a reconstructed 1862 Whipple truss bridge. In 2006 the reserve was designated a Bird Conservation Area.

The Mohawk Towpath Byway passes through Vischer Ferry.
