= Vischer Ferry Nature and Historic Preserve =

Site in New York, United States

Coordinates: 42°47′44″N 73°48′25″W

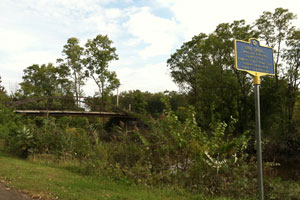
Whipple Truss Bridge at the entrance to the Vischer Ferry Nature and Historic Preserve

The Vischer Ferry Nature and Historic Preserve is a 740-acre (3.0 km^{2}) site (including submerged areas) along the Mohawk River in the Town of Clifton Park, New York, near the hamlet of Vischer Ferry. It is owned by the New York State Canal Corporation, but Clifton Park maintains its extensive trail system under a special lease arrangement. The preserve also is known as Vischer Ferry Bird Conservation Area.

The preserve includes an original section of the Erie Canal and towpath, constructed in 1825. The main entrance to the preserve includes an 1862 Whipple Truss Bridge, a design commonly used to cross the Erie Canal.

Numerous migratory bird species and at-risk bird species use the preserve as habitat. Among these species are:

- Virginia rail
- Green heron
- Heron
- American bittern
- Egrets
- Common nighthawk
- Rusty blackbird

The preserve also includes an abundance of flora, both native and invasive, from hazelnut to bloodroot to white campion.
