= Niskayuna High School =

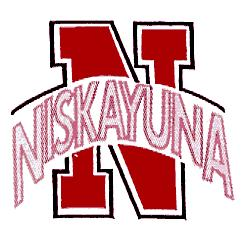

Location
- 1626 Balltown Road; Niskayuna, New York, 12309; United States; 42°49′6″N 73°53′22″W

Information
- Type: Public
- Established: 1957
- Principal: Anthony Malizia
- Staff: 101.64 (FTE)
- Enrollment: 1,363 (2023–2024)
- Student to teacher ratio: 13.41
- Colors: Red and silver
- Nickname: Nisky
- Publication: Flare (Literary Magazine)
- Newspaper: The Warrior
- Yearbook: Crossroads Yearbook
- Website: https://www.niskayunaschools.org/niskayuna-high-school/

Niskayuna High School is a public high school in Niskayuna, New York, United States, and is the only high school operated by the Niskayuna Central School District.

== History ==
Niskayuna High School opened in 1957 after the Board of Education recommended in 1954 that the district build its own high school. Until then, students attended an area high school of their choice. The 1st graduating class was 1959 with 138 students. Since then, over 18,000 students have graduated from Niskayuna High School. A large expansion was completed in April 2011.. an ongoing capital project includes a new track, parking lot, new athletic fields, and adding pedestrian sidewalks.

== Academics ==
Niskayuna High School was named a National Blue Ribbon School of Excellence in 1983. In 1999, the Wall Street Journal named Niskayuna High School one of the top performing high schools in the country. In 2003, the Washington Post cited Niskayuna High School as one of the best high schools in the nation. In 2006, Niskayuna High School was rated as one of "America's Best High Schools" by Newsweek magazine, with an index (total Advanced Placement Exams taken in 2005 divided by total number of graduating seniors) of 1.340.

The Albany Business Review rated Niskayuna High School the top-ranked high school in the entire Capital District in both its 2016 and 2014 Annual Schools Report. In 2012, U.S. News & World Report listed Niskayuna High School as the top rated public high school in upstate New York. According to U.S. News & World Report's Best High School Rankings in 2019, Niskayuna High School is ranked as #3 in Albany, NY Metro Area High Schools, #106 in New York State High Schools, and #1,254 in the country.

For the Class of 2005, 94% of all graduating seniors attended college.

== Notable alumni ==
- Colin Angle, co-founder of iRobot
- Vinnie Amico, drummer for the band moe.
- Jeff Blatnick, a wrestler who won a gold medal in the 1984 Summer Olympics and is currently a Distinguished Member of the National Wrestling Hall of Fame and Museum, 2015 UFC Hall of Fame inductee.
- Andy Bloom, an Olympic athlete competing in the shot put.
- Kevin Burns, reality TV producer, Prometheus Entertainment; former professor and studio executive
- Garrett Whitley, outfielder and #13 overall pick in the 2015 MLB draft by the Tampa Bay Rays
- Brian Chesky, Co-founder, CEO Airbnb.com
- Ben Coccio, co-writer of the script for the film The Place Beyond the Pines
- André Davis, wide receiver for the Houston Texans of the NFL
- Kate Fagan, Reporter and TV Personality for ESPN and author
- James Howe, prominent author of children's literature
- Gilbert King, 2013 Pulitzer Prize winner for non-fiction
- Steve Katz, rock musician (Blues Project, Blood, Sweat & Tears); did not graduate
- James Read, an actor who starred in North and South with Patrick Swayze.
- Ron Rivest, a cryptographer and MIT Computer Science professor, most famous for helping develop the RSA algorithm
- Joshua Seftel, a filmmaker, primarily of documentaries; won an Academy Award for "All the Empty Rooms" (Best Documentary Short) in 2026.
- Louis Serafini, distance runner
- Kayla Treanor, lacrosse player and head coach for the Syracuse Orange women's lacrosse team
- Huh Yunjin, a member of the South Korean girl group Le Sserafim, transferred to the Department of Applied Music at Hanlim Multi Art School in South Korea in 2019.
