= Vischer Ferry Historic District =

Historic district in New York, United States

- U.S. National Register of Historic Places
- U.S. Historic district
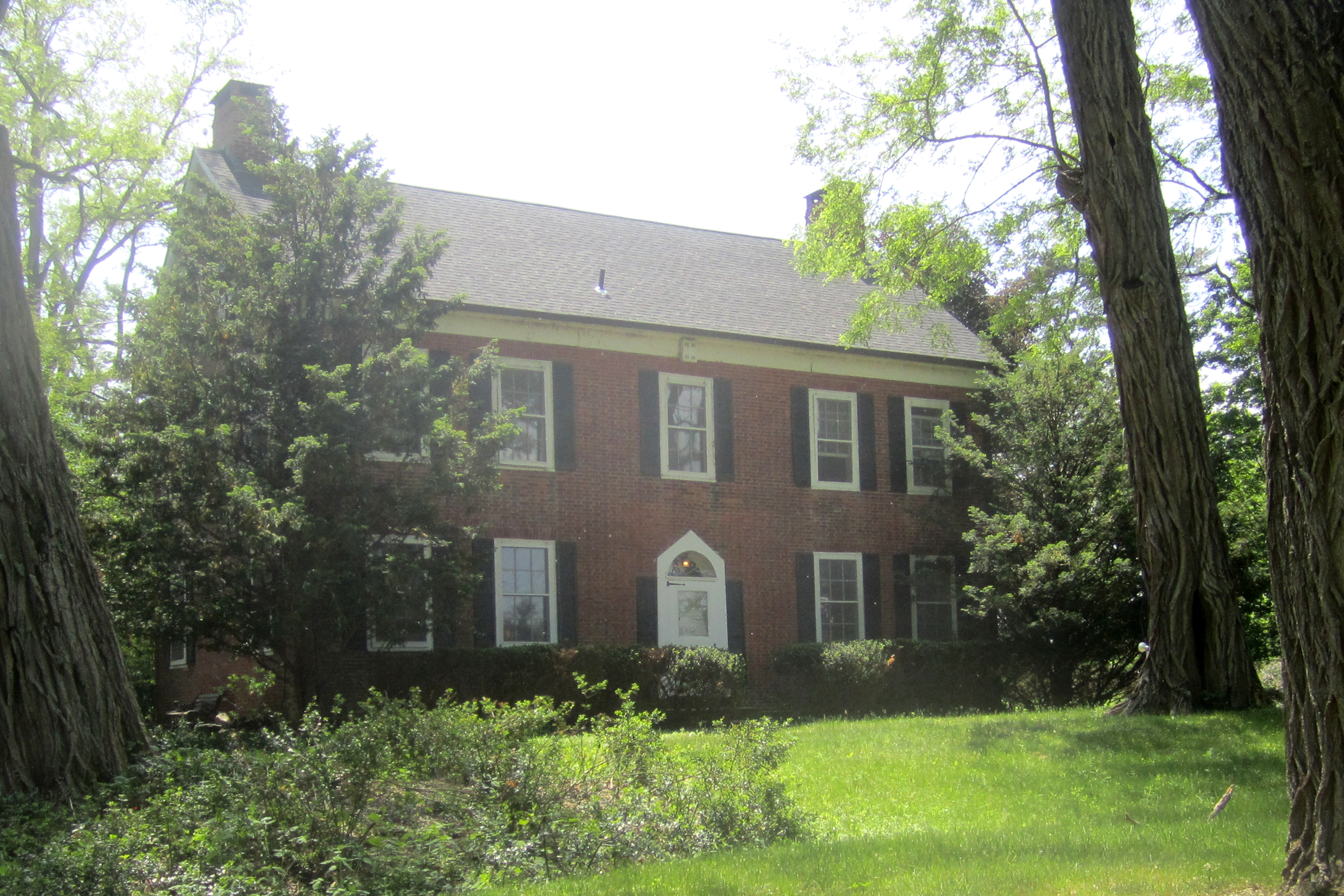
- Nicholas and Eldret Vischer House

- Location within New York Location within the United States
- Interactive map showing the location for Fischer Ferry Historic District
- Nearest city: Schenectady, New York
- Coordinates: 42°47′41″N 73°49′12″W
- Built: 1728
- Architect: Multiple
- Architectural style: Greek Revival, Late Victorian, Federal
- NRHP reference No.: 75001224 (original) and 97000530 (increase)
- Added to NRHP: October 15, 1975 (original) and June 19, 1997 (increase)

Vischer Ferry Historic District is a historic district in Saratoga County, New York. It was listed on the National Register of Historic Places in 1975 and its boundaries were increased in 1997. The district, located along the Erie Canal, contains several historic structures within the hamlet of Vischer Ferry. These include the Nicholas and Eldret Vischer House, dating from the mid-1700s.

It was listed on the National Register of Historic Places in 1975, with a boundary increase in 1997.

== Gallery ==
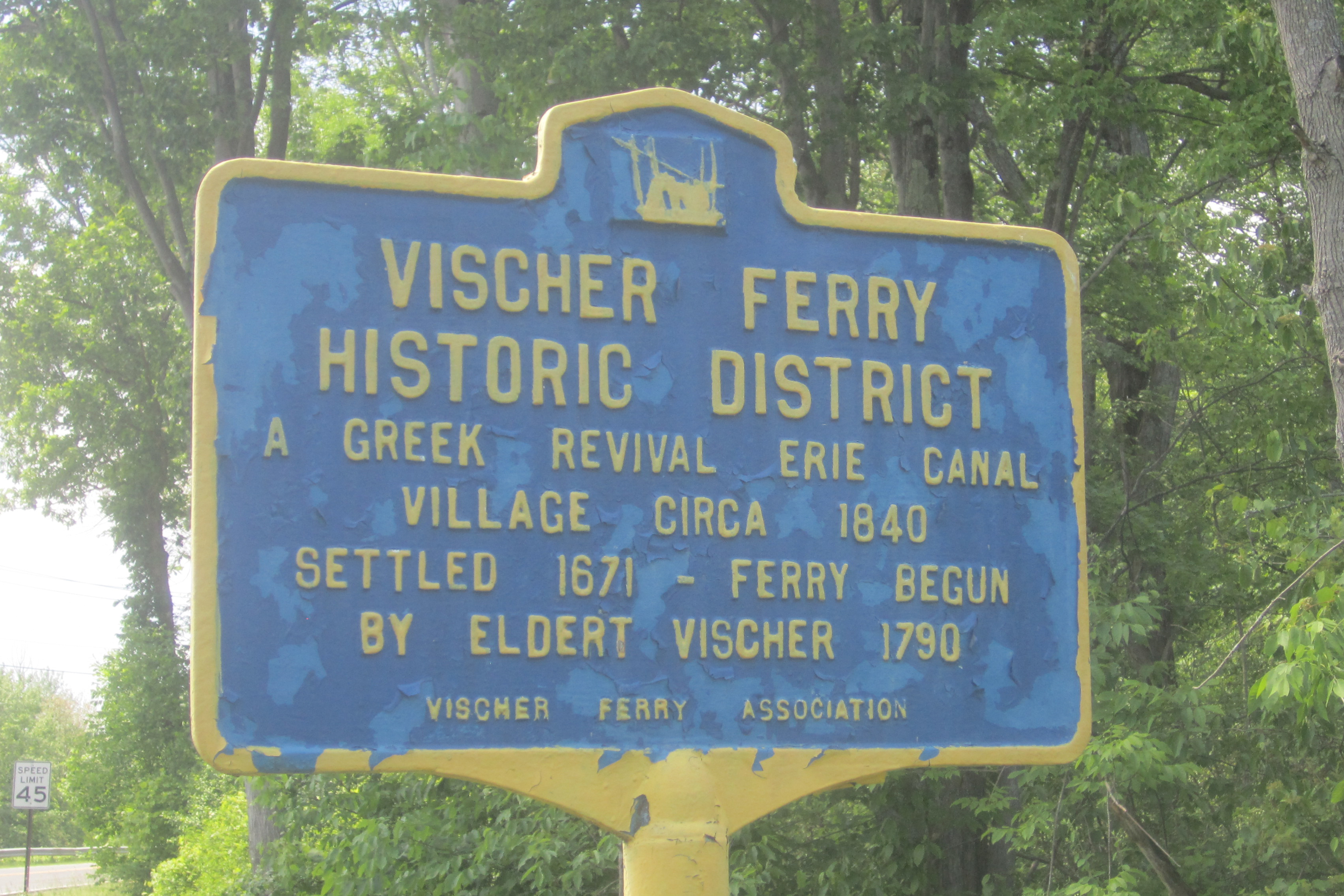

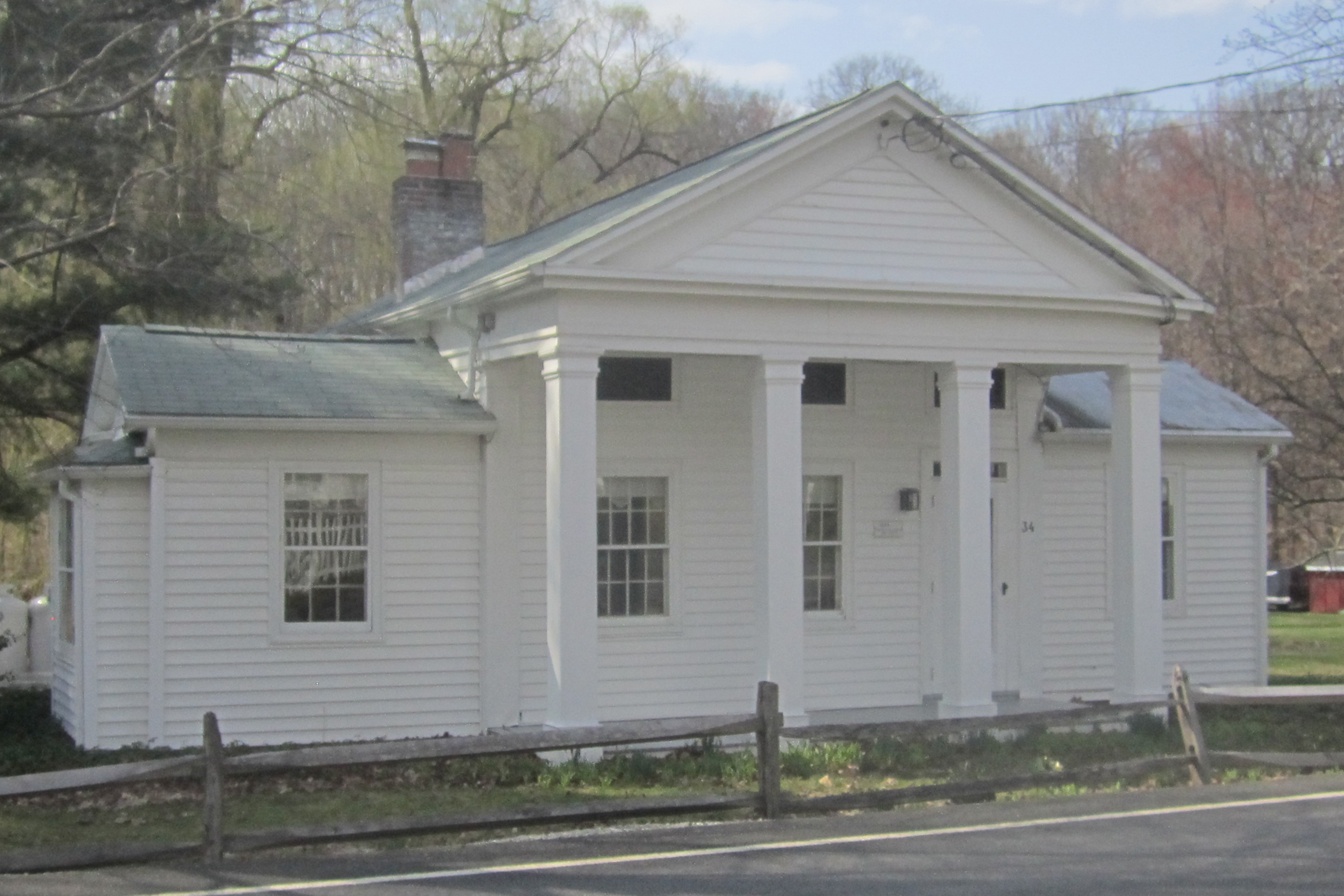
1844 house of Shephard Wheeler, ships' carpenter.

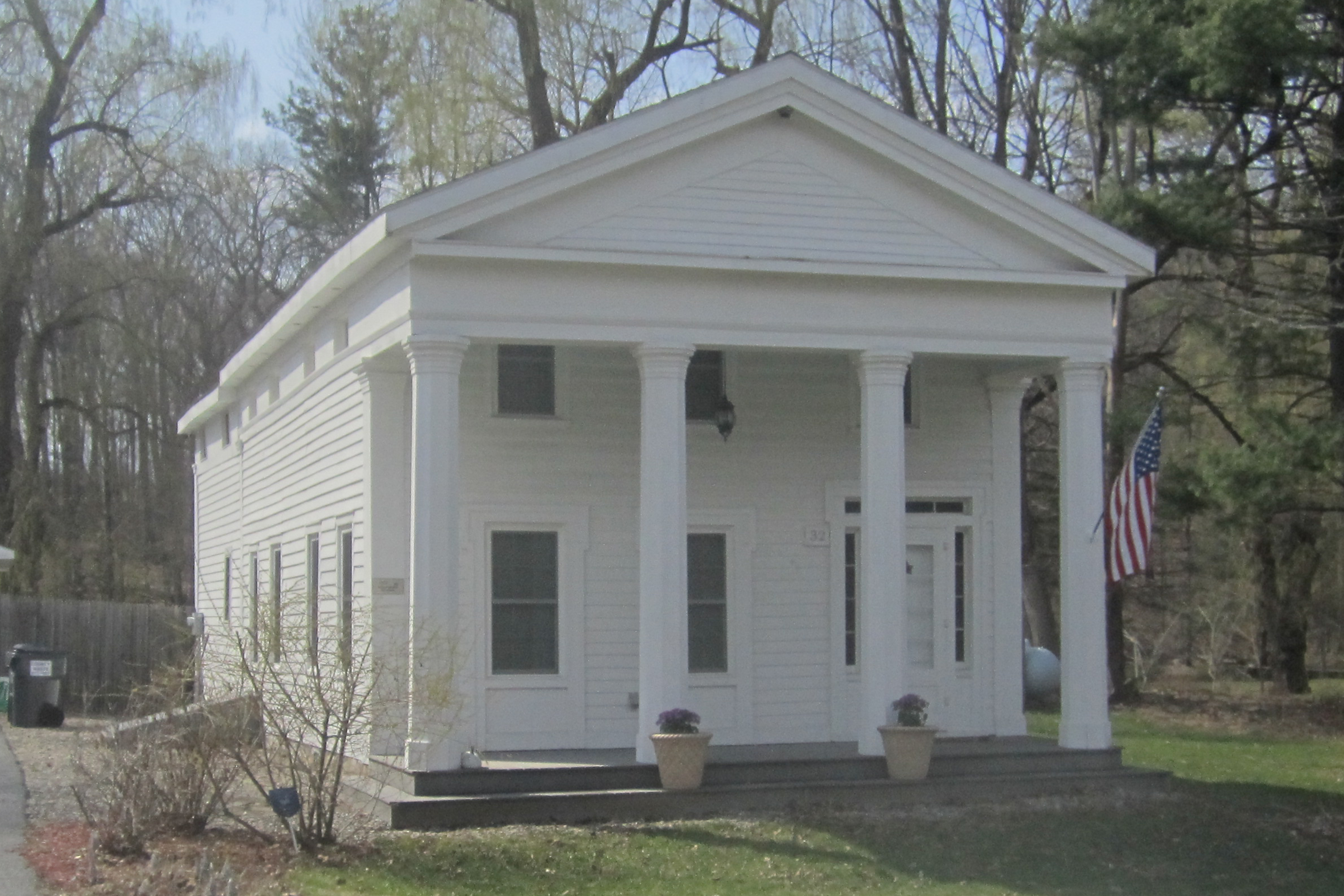
1850 house of Matthias Peters, ships' carpenter.

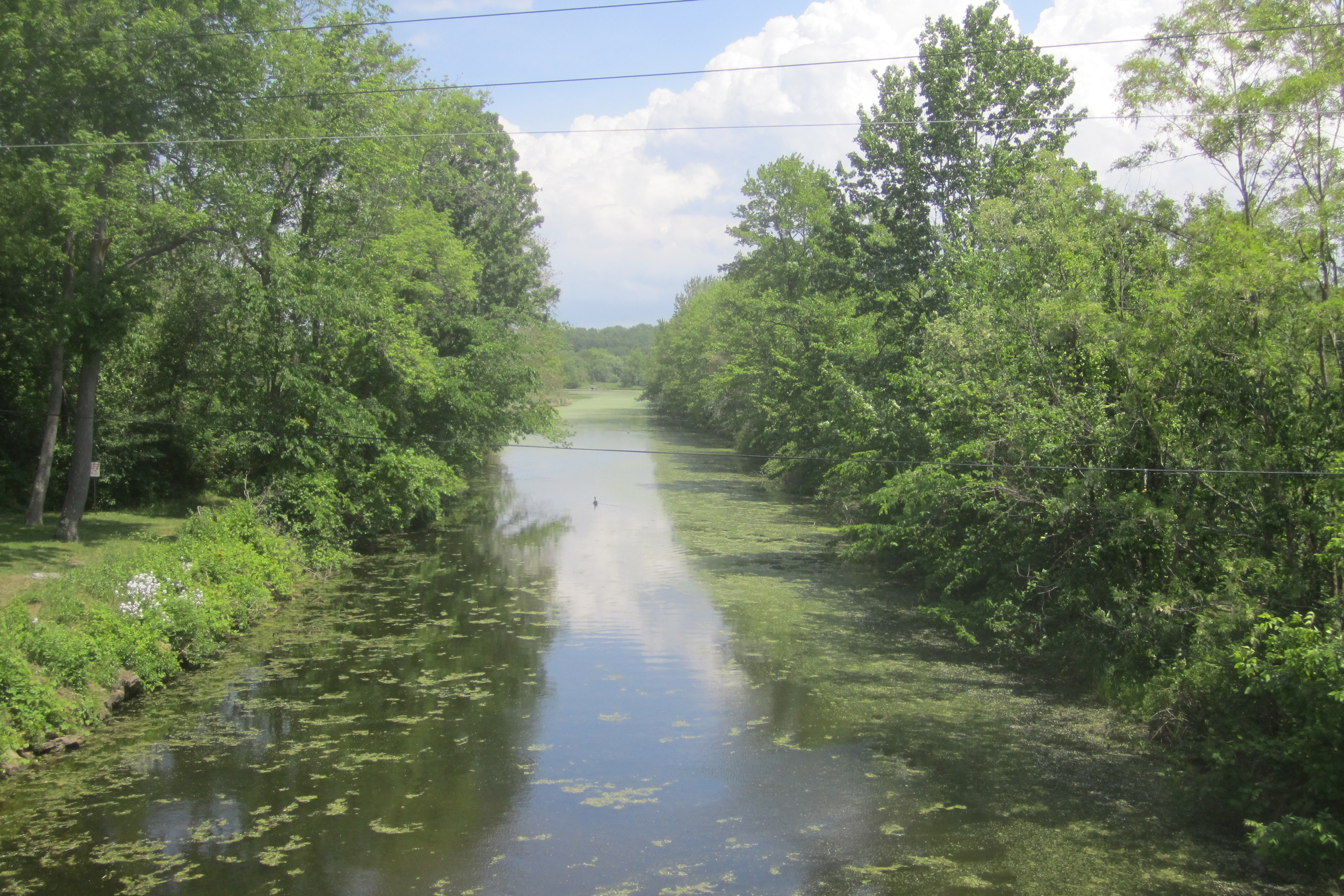
Erie Canal at Vischer Ferry
