= Niskayuna (CDP), New York =

Niskayuna, New York
- Census-designated place & hamlet
- Location in Schenectady County and the state of New York.
- Coordinates: 42°49′2″N 73°53′51″W
- Country: United States
- State: New York
- County: Schenectady

Area
  - Total: 12.34 sq mi (31.95 km^{2})
  - Land: 11.88 sq mi (30.76 km^{2})
  - Water: 0.46 sq mi (1.19 km^{2})
- Elevation: 292 ft (89 m)

Population (2020)
  - Total: 20,787
  - Density: 1,750.3/sq mi (675.79/km^{2})
- Time zone: UTC-5 (Eastern (EST))
  - Summer (DST): UTC-4 (EDT)
- ZIP code: 12309
- Area code: 518
- FIPS code: 36-51275
- GNIS feature ID: 0958621

Niskayuna is a hamlet (and census-designated place) in Schenectady County, New York, United States. The population was 20,787 at the 2020 census.

The hamlet of Niskayuna is in the town of Niskayuna.

== Geography ==
Niskayuna is located at 42°49′2″N 73°53′51″W (42.817226, -73.897575).

According to the United States Census Bureau, the CDP has a total area of 1.0 square mile (2.6 km^{2}), all land.

== Demographics ==
Historical population
| Census | Pop. | Note | %± |
|---|---|---|---|
| 2020 | 20,787 | | — |
U.S. Decennial Census

As of the census of 2000, there were 4,892 people, 1,940 households, and 1,435 families residing in the CDP. The population density was 4,817.4 inhabitants per square mile (1,860.0/km^{2}). There were 1,983 housing units at an average density of 1,952.8 per square mile (754.0/km^{2}). The racial makeup of the CDP was 94.66% White, 1.04% Black or African American, 0.06% Native American, 2.60% Asian, 0.08% Pacific Islander, 0.41% from other races, and 1.14% from two or more races. Hispanic or Latino of any race were 1.57% of the population.

There were 1,940 households, out of which 36.5% had children under the age of 18 living with them, 60.1% were married couples living together, 10.7% had a female householder with no husband present, and 26.0% were non-families. 22.3% of all households were made up of individuals, and 11.2% had someone living alone who was 65 years of age or older. The average household size was 2.51 and the average family size was 2.96.

In the CDP, the population was spread out, with 27.2% under the age of 18, 4.1% from 18 to 24, 27.8% from 25 to 44, 24.6% from 45 to 64, and 16.3% who were 65 years of age or older. The median age was 40 years. For every 100 females, there were 90.4 males. For every 100 females age 18 and over, there were 85.4 males.

The median income for a household in the CDP was $65,077, and the median income for a family was $72,526. Males had a median income of $51,801 versus $39,167 for females. The per capita income for the CDP was $29,786. About 0.9% of families and 1.3% of the population were below the poverty line, including 1.1% of those under age 18 and 0.5% of those age 65 or over.
