= Niskayuna, New York =

- Town
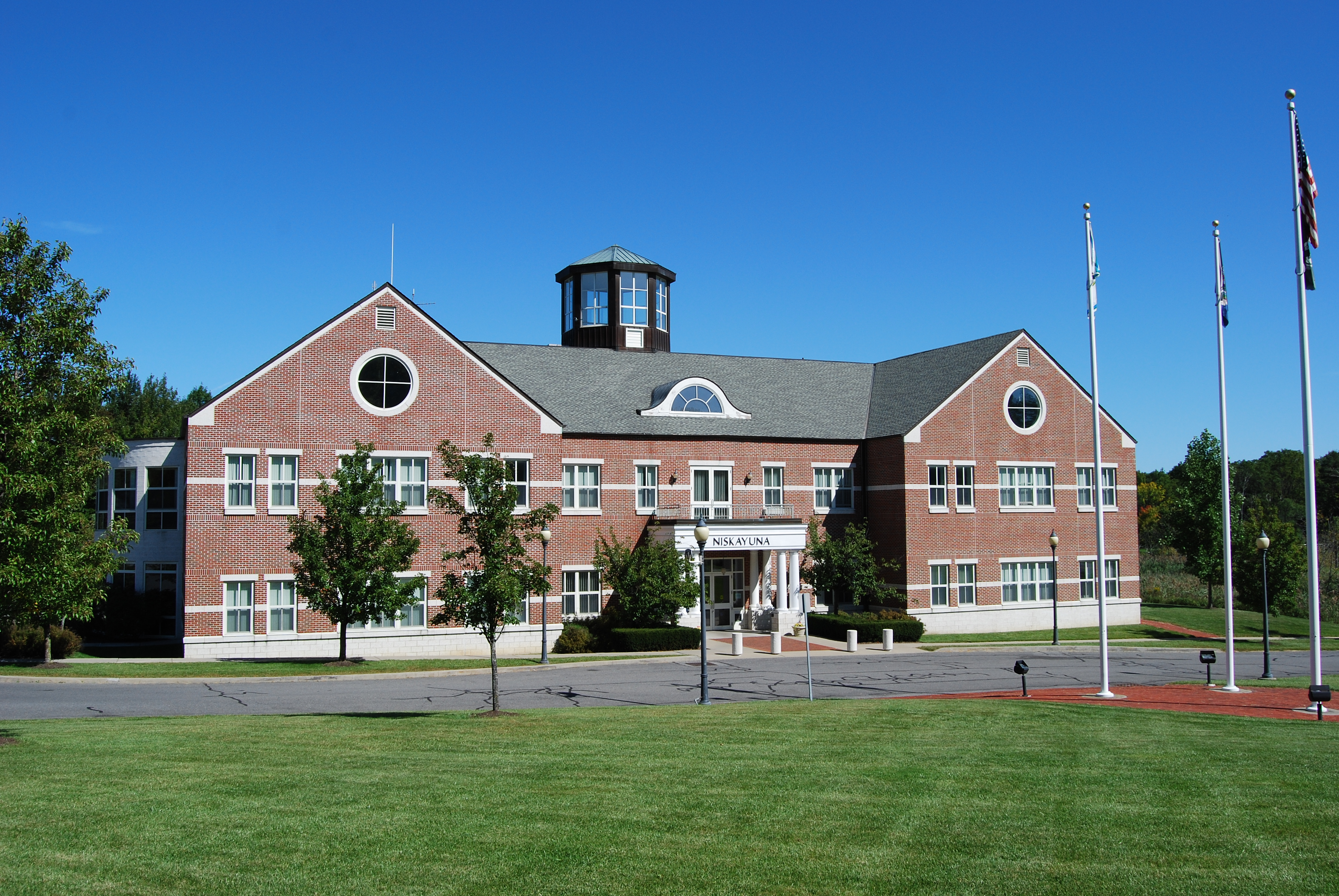
- Niskayuna town hall

- Location in Schenectady County and the state of New York

- Location within New York Location within the United States
- Coordinates: 42°48′1″N 73°52′51″W
- Country: United States
- State: New York
- County: Schenectady

Government
  - Type: Town board
  - Town supervisor: Erin Cassady-Dorion

Area
  - Total: 15.04 sq mi (38.95 km^{2})
  - Land: 14.15 sq mi (36.65 km^{2})
  - Water: 0.89 sq mi (2.31 km^{2})
- Elevation: 404 ft (123 m)

Population (2020)
  - Total: 23,278
  - Density: 1,645.0/sq mi (635.14/km^{2})
- Time zone: UTC-5 (Eastern (EST))
  - Summer (DST): UTC-4 (EDT)
- ZIP code: 12309
- Area code: 518
- FIPS code: 36-51264
- GNIS feature ID: 0979279
- Website: www.niskayuna.gov

Niskayuna is a town in Schenectady County, New York, United States. The population was 23,278 at the 2020 census. The town is located in the southeast part of the county, east of the city of Schenectady, and is the easternmost town in the county.

== History ==
The town of Niskayuna was created on March 7, 1809, from the town of Watervliet, with an initial population of 681. The town's name was derived from early patents to Dutch settlers: Nis-ti-go-wo-ne or Co-nis-tig-i-one, both derived from the Mohawk language. The 19th-century historians Howell and Munsell mistakenly identified Conistigione as an Indian tribe, but they were a band of Mohawk people known by the term for this location. The original meaning of the words translate roughly as "extensive corn flats", as the Mohawk for centuries cultivated maize fields in the fertile bottomlands along today's Mohawk River. They were the easternmost of the Five Nations of the Iroquois Confederacy.

Among the Mohawk chiefs who lived in the area were Ron-warrigh-woh-go-wa (meaning in English the great fault finder or grumbler), Ka-na-da-rokh-go-wa (a great eater), Ro-ya-na (a chief), As-sa-ve-go (big knife), and A-voon-ta-go-wa (big tree). Of these, Ron-warrigh-woh-go-wa strongly objected to selling communal lands to the whites. He ensured that the Mohawk retained the rights of hunting and fishing on lands they deeded to the Dutch and other whites. He was reported to have said that "after the whites had taken possession of our lands, they will make Kaut-sore [literally spoon-food or soup] of our bodies." He generally aided the settlers during the mid-18th century against the Canadians in the French and Indian War, the North American front of the Seven Years' War.

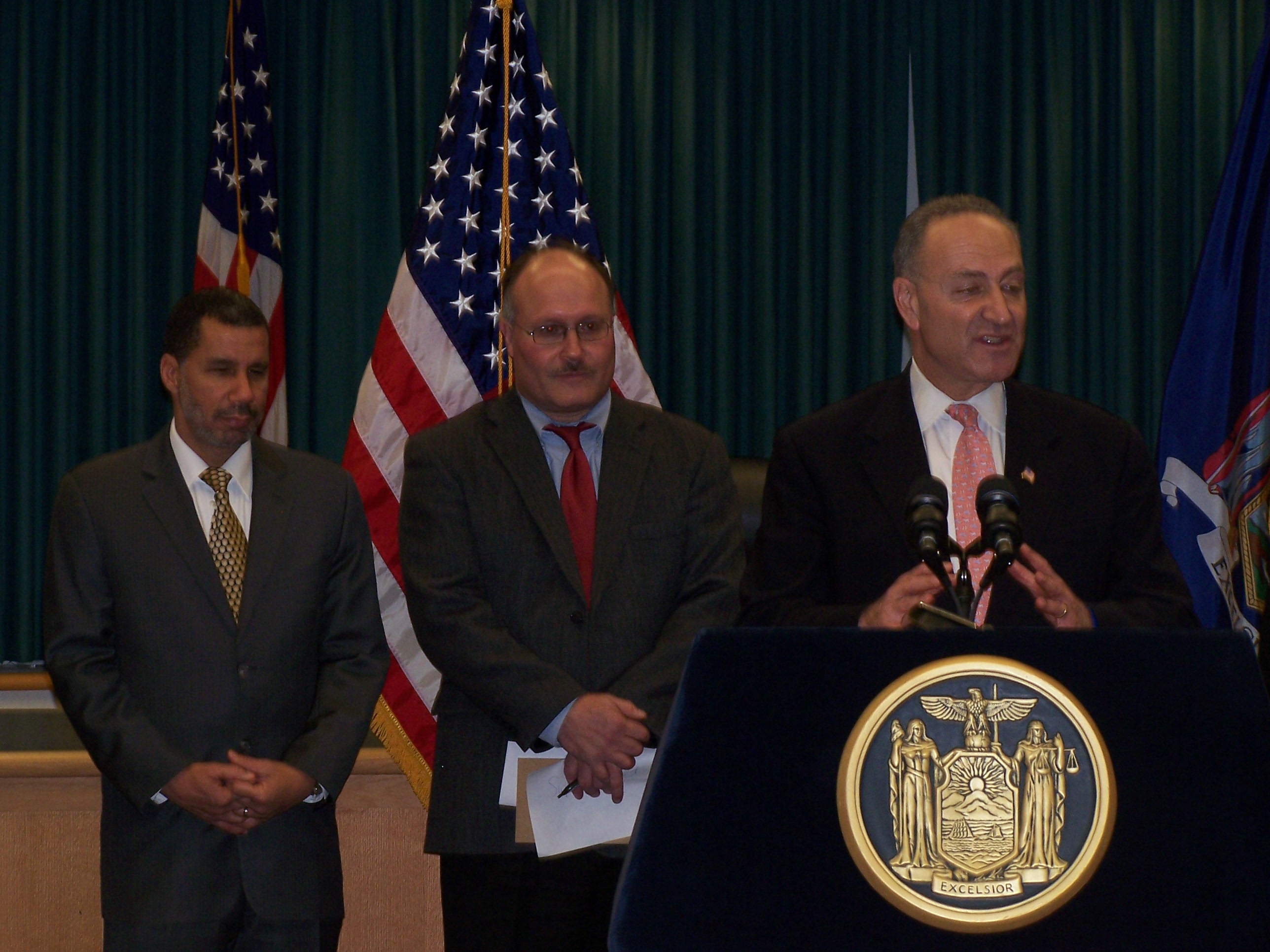
L to R: Governor David Paterson in Niskayuna with town Supervisor Landry and Senator Chuck Schumer at microphone, c. 2000s

The first European settlers of the town were Dutch colonists who chose to locate outside the manor of Rensselaerwyck to avoid the oversight of the patroons and the trading government of New Netherland. Harmon Vedder obtained a patent for some land in 1664, soon after the founders in 1661 gained land in what developed as the village and city of Schenectady. The traders of Fort Orange retained their monopoly, forbidding the settlers in the Schenectady area from fur trading. They developed mostly as farmers.

Among the early settlers were the ethnic Dutch Van Brookhoven, Claase, Clute, Consaul, Groot, Jansen, Krieger (Cregier), Pearse, Tymerson, Vedder, Van Vranken, and Vrooman families. Captain Martin Cregier, the first burgomaster of New Amsterdam, later settled in Niskayuna; he died in 1712.

Following the Revolutionary War, Yankee settlers entered New York, settling in the Mohawk Valley and to the west. The Erie Canal of 1825 and later enlargements brought increased traffic and trade through the valley. During the 19th and 20th centuries, industries developed along the Mohawk River, especially concentrated in Schenectady in this county. Farming continued in outlying areas. The headquarters of General Electric and Westinghouse Electric developed in the city of Schenectady, which became a center of broad-reaching innovation in uses of electricity and a variety of consumer products.

After World War II, the Knolls Atomic Power Laboratory was opened in 1946 in Niskayuna, under a contract between General Electric and the US government. In 1973, the General Electric Engineering Development Center moved from downtown Schenectady to River Road in Niskayuna. Today, it is one of the two world headquarters of GE Global Research with the other in Bangalore, India. Due to high-level scientific and technological jobs associated with these businesses, Niskayuna has a high level of education among its residents and a high per capita income of towns in the capital area.

The following sites in the town are listed on the National Register of Historic Places: George Westinghouse Jones House, Niskayuna Railroad Station, Niskayuna Reformed Church, and Rosendale Common School.

== Geography ==
The northern and eastern town lines are defined by the Mohawk River with Saratoga County, New York, on the opposite bank. The south town line is the town of Colonie in Albany County. Lock 7 of the Erie Canal is located in the town. The town is bordered by the city of Schenectady to the west.

According to the United States Census Bureau, the town has a total area of 15.1 square miles (39.0 km^{2}), of which 14.2 square miles (36.7 km^{2}) is land and 0.89 square miles (2.3 km^{2}), or 5.92%, is water.

Niskayuna previously received the designation of Tree City USA, though it is not listed on the current Tree City USA roster.

== Demographics ==
Historical population
Census	Pop.	Note	%±
1820	516		—
1830	446		−13.6%
1840	693		55.4%
1850	783		13.0%
1860	789		0.8%
1870	1,105		40.1%
1880	990		−10.4%
1890	1,040		5.1%
1900	1,327		27.6%
1910	1,907		43.7%
1920	3,149		65.1%
1930	4,931		56.6%
1940	6,348		28.7%
1950	9,442		48.7%
1960	14,032		48.6%
1970	17,879		27.4%
1980	17,471		−2.3%
1990	19,048		9.0%
2000	20,295		6.5%
2010	21,781		7.3%
2020	23,278		6.9%
U.S. Decennial Census

As of the census of 2020, there were 23,278 people, 7,285 single family homes,1,415 apartments, and a small number of town houses and condominiums. The population density was 1,438.3 inhabitants per square mile (555.3/km^{2}). There were 8,046 housing units at an average density of 570.2 per square mile (220.2/km^{2}). The town's population was 51.7% female and 48.3% male. The racial makeup of the town was 90.7% White, 6.0% Asian, 1.9% African-American, and 1.6% "Other."

There were 7,787 households, out of which 36.2% had children under the age of 18 living with them, 64.2% were married couples living together, 7.6% had a female householder with no husband present, and 25.6% were non-families. 22.1% of all households were made up of individuals, and 11.5% had someone living alone who was 65 years of age or older. The average household size was 2.56 and the average family size was 3.02.

In the town, the population was spread out, with 26.1% under the age of 18, 4.2% from 18 to 24, 25.4% from 25 to 44, 27.1% from 45 to 64, and 17.1% who were 65 years of age or older. The median age was 42 years. For every 100 females, there were 93.3 males. For every 100 females age 18 and over, there were 87.8 males.

The median income for a household in the town was $93,800, and the median income for a family was $94,539. Males had a median income of $59,738 versus $39,692 for females. The per capita income for the town was $33,257. The Town has many residents who commute about fifteen miles to work in Albany, the capital of New York State.

== Niska Day ==
Since 1980, the annual community holiday "Niska-Day" (or Nisky-Day) is traditionally celebrated on the first Saturday after the third Friday in May. The festival begins in the early morning with a family foot race. This is followed by a parade and a fair. The day concludes with fireworks (weather permitting). Community groups pick a new theme each year (e.g., in 2007: "Niska-unity"). The town has the goal of bringing the families together for a celebration to help them recognize and appreciate their shared identity as residents of the town of Niskayuna. It takes place at the Craig Elementary School soccer fields.

The celebration was established in 1980 by the Niskayuna Community Action Program (N-CAP), responding to a school district report on mental health needs, to reinforce shared community identification. Unlike many municipalities, the town of Niskayuna does not sponsor an official observation of the Fourth of July. "Niska-Day" serves as the local substitute.

== Education ==
The Niskayuna Central School District is based in town. The district includes five elementary schools, two middle schools, and one high school.

== Communities and locations ==
- Aqueduct – A hamlet at the northern tip of the town.
- Avon Crest – A large suburban development south of Troy-Schenectady Road.
- Avon Crest North – An extension of Avon Crest to the north of Troy-Schenectady Road.
- Catherine's Woods Estates – A small neighborhood on the east side of the town near the Mohawk River.
- Edison Woods – A small, newer, upscale suburban development near the Knolls Atomic Power Laboratory.
- Forest Oaks – A small, upscale development off Pearse Road which borders Albany County.
- Grand Blvd Estates – A neighborhood on either side of the tree-lined Grand Boulevard mall. Its center mall was once the route of a main trolley line from the Hillside Avenue trolley barns to downtown Schenectady.
- Hawthorne Hill – A suburban community east of Schenectady.
- Hexam Gardens - a small development between Balltown Rd, Rt. 7, and the Reist Bird Sanctuary.
- Karen Crest – A small development in the southwestern part of town near Hillside School.
- Merlin Park - A residential area bordered by Route 7 (south), Rosendale Road (north), Mohawk Road (west) and WTRY Road (east).
- Niska Isle – A peninsula along the Mohawk River
- Niskayuna – A hamlet and census-designated place in the southeast part of the town.
- "Old Niskayuna" – The area of the town west of Balltown Road and north of Union Street. The term is a misnomer; "Old Niskayuna" is actually the Niskayuna hamlet at the east end of town that once extended well into what is now the town of Colonie.
- Orchard Park – A small neighborhood situated between GE Global Research and Niskayuna High School and bordered by Balltown Road on the west and River Road to the north.
- Rosendale Estates – A large suburban development in the central part of the town near Rosendale Elementary school and Iroquois Middle School.
- Stanford Heights – A hamlet in the southwest corner of the town that contains a historic mansion once owned by the parents of Leland Stanford and then later by their son Charles Stanford.
- Windsor Estates – Another small, upscale development near GE Global Research and the Knolls Atomic Power Laboratory (KAPL). The front entrance leads to Van Antwerp Road, Niskayuna High School, and Town Hall, while the back entrance leads to River Road.
- Woodcrest – A suburban neighborhood located off VanAntwerp Road connected west of Rosendale Estates.

== Notable people ==
- Colin Angle – co-founder and CEO of iRobot
- Jeff Blatnick (1957–2012) – wrestler, Olympic gold medalist
- Brian Chesky – co-founder of Airbnb
- Ben Coccio – filmmaker and screenwriter, cowriter of Place Beyond the Pines and Zero Day
- André Davis – NFL wide receiver (played for Houston Texans)
- William A. Edelstein (1944–2014) – physicist, the primary inventor of spin-warp imaging, which is still used in all commercial MRI systems
- Kate Fagan – former ESPN sports reporter, podcast host, and author (Originally from Warwick, Rhode Island)
- Lawrence P. Flynn – Adjutant General of New York, lived in Niskayuna
- Ivar Giaever – Norwegian-American physicist, 1972 Nobel laureate (Originally from Bergen, Norway)
- Huh Yunjin (Jennifer Huh) – South Korean-American singer-songwriter, dancer, entertainer and K-pop idol, member of the South Korean K-pop girlgroup Le Sserafim (Originally from Irwon-dong, Gangnam-gu, Seoul, South Korea)
- Steve Katz – musician, Blues Project, and Blood, Sweat & Tears
- Gilbert King (born 1962) – author of Devil in the Grove (2012), winner of the 2013 Pulitzer Prize for General Nonfiction
- Marc LaBelle – musician, singer, songwriter, Dirty Honey
- Lyn Lifshin (1942–2019) – poet (Originally from Burlington, Vermont)
- Clarence Linder (1903–1994) – General Electric executive (Originally from Ogema, Wisconsin)
- Maureen O'Sullivan (1911–1998) – Irish-American actress, mother of Mia Farrow (Originally from Boyle, County Roscommon, Ireland)
- Gabriella Pizzolo – actress, appeared in Matilda the Musical and Fun Home on Broadway and Stranger Things
- Ron Rivest – cryptographer, co-inventor of the RSA encryption algorithm
- Louis Serafini, distance runner
- Kayla Treanor – lacrosse player and coach for Syracuse and USA Lacrosse
- Garrett Whitley – baseball prospect, drafted in first round of 2015 MLB draft by the Tampa Bay Rays (Originally from Melrose, Massachusetts)
- Andrew Yang – politician and entrepreneur

== Literary references ==
Herman Melville, in his novel Moby Dick, refers to a sailor on the ship Jeroboam who, according to a story relayed by Stubb, the second mate on the Pequod, "had been originally nurtured among the crazy society of Neskyeuna Shakers, where he had been a great prophet.”

== In popular culture ==
Niskayuna appears in a driving montage in The Simpsons episode "D'oh Canada." The background image named Baggage in the main menu of the computer game Counter Strike 2 shows a suitcase with a sticker that reads Niskayuna NY.
