= East Glenville, New York =

- Census-designated place
- Location in Schenectady County and the state of New York.
- Coordinates: 42°52′9″N 73°54′58″W
- Country: United States
- State: New York
- County: Schenectady

Area
  - Total: 10.36 sq mi (26.83 km^{2})
  - Land: 10.06 sq mi (26.06 km^{2})
  - Water: 0.30 sq mi (0.77 km^{2})
- Elevation: 360 ft (110 m)

Population (2020)
  - Total: 11,896
  - Density: 1,182.5/sq mi (456.55/km^{2})
- Time zone: UTC-5 (Eastern (EST))
  - Summer (DST): UTC-4 (EDT)
- ZIP code: 12302
- Area code: 518
- FIPS code: 36-22084
- GNIS feature ID: 0949081

East Glenville is a hamlet (and a census-designated place) in Schenectady County, New York, United States. As of the 2020 census, East Glenville had a population of 11,896. The CDP includes the adjacent hamlet of Alplaus.

East Glenville is in the town of Glenville .

== Geography ==
East Glenville is located at 42°52′9″N 73°54′58″W (42.869076, -73.916234).

According to the United States Census Bureau, the CDP has a total area of 7.5 square miles (19 km^{2}), of which 7.3 square miles (19 km^{2}) is land and 0.2 square miles (0.52 km^{2}), or 2.81%, is water.

== Demographics ==
Historical population
| Census | Pop. | Note | %± |
|---|---|---|---|
| 2020 | 11,896 | | — |
U.S. Decennial Census

=== 2020 census ===
As of the 2020 census, East Glenville had a population of 11,896. The median age was 46.0 years. 20.3% of residents were under the age of 18 and 24.3% of residents were 65 years of age or older. For every 100 females there were 93.7 males, and for every 100 females age 18 and over there were 90.6 males age 18 and over.

98.1% of residents lived in urban areas, while 1.9% lived in rural areas.

There were 4,994 households in East Glenville, of which 25.5% had children under the age of 18 living in them. Of all households, 50.7% were married-couple households, 16.4% were households with a male householder and no spouse or partner present, and 26.0% were households with a female householder and no spouse or partner present. About 30.5% of all households were made up of individuals and 17.8% had someone living alone who was 65 years of age or older.

There were 5,377 housing units, of which 7.1% were vacant. The homeowner vacancy rate was 2.1% and the rental vacancy rate was 9.5%.

Racial composition as of the 2020 census
| Race | Number | Percent |
|---|---|---|
| White | 10,454 | 87.9% |
| Black or African American | 242 | 2.0% |
| American Indian and Alaska Native | 11 | 0.1% |
| Asian | 293 | 2.5% |
| Native Hawaiian and Other Pacific Islander | 4 | 0.0% |
| Some other race | 121 | 1.0% |
| Two or more races | 771 | 6.5% |
| Hispanic or Latino (of any race) | 440 | 3.7% |

=== 2000 census ===
As of the census of 2000, there were 6,064 people, 2,181 households, and 1,613 families residing in the CDP. The population density was 834.5 inhabitants per square mile (322.2/km^{2}). There were 2,248 housing units at an average density of 309.3 per square mile (119.4/km^{2}). The racial makeup of the CDP was 97.16% White, 1.02% African American, 0.15% Native American, 1.07% Asian, 0.03% Pacific Islander, 0.08% from other races, and 0.48% from two or more races. Hispanic or Latino of any race were 1.20% of the population.

There were 2,181 households, out of which 30.7% had children under the age of 18 living with them, 65.1% were married couples living together, 6.6% had a female householder with no husband present, and 26.0% were non-families. 22.4% of all households were made up of individuals, and 9.9% had someone living alone who was 65 years of age or older. The average household size was 2.52 and the average family size was 2.95.

In the CDP, the population was spread out, with 22.1% under the age of 18, 4.8% from 18 to 24, 24.9% from 25 to 44, 27.0% from 45 to 64, and 21.1% who were 65 years of age or older. The median age was 44 years. For every 100 females, there were 93.3 males. For every 100 females age 18 and over, there were 87.0 males.

The median income for a household in the CDP was $62,447, and the median income for a family was $68,529. Males had a median income of $50,152 versus $27,201 for females. The per capita income for the CDP was $26,803. None of the families and 2.0% of the population were living below the poverty line, including no under eighteens and 1.4% of those over 64.
