= Garrett Whitley (baseball) =

American baseball player (born 1997)

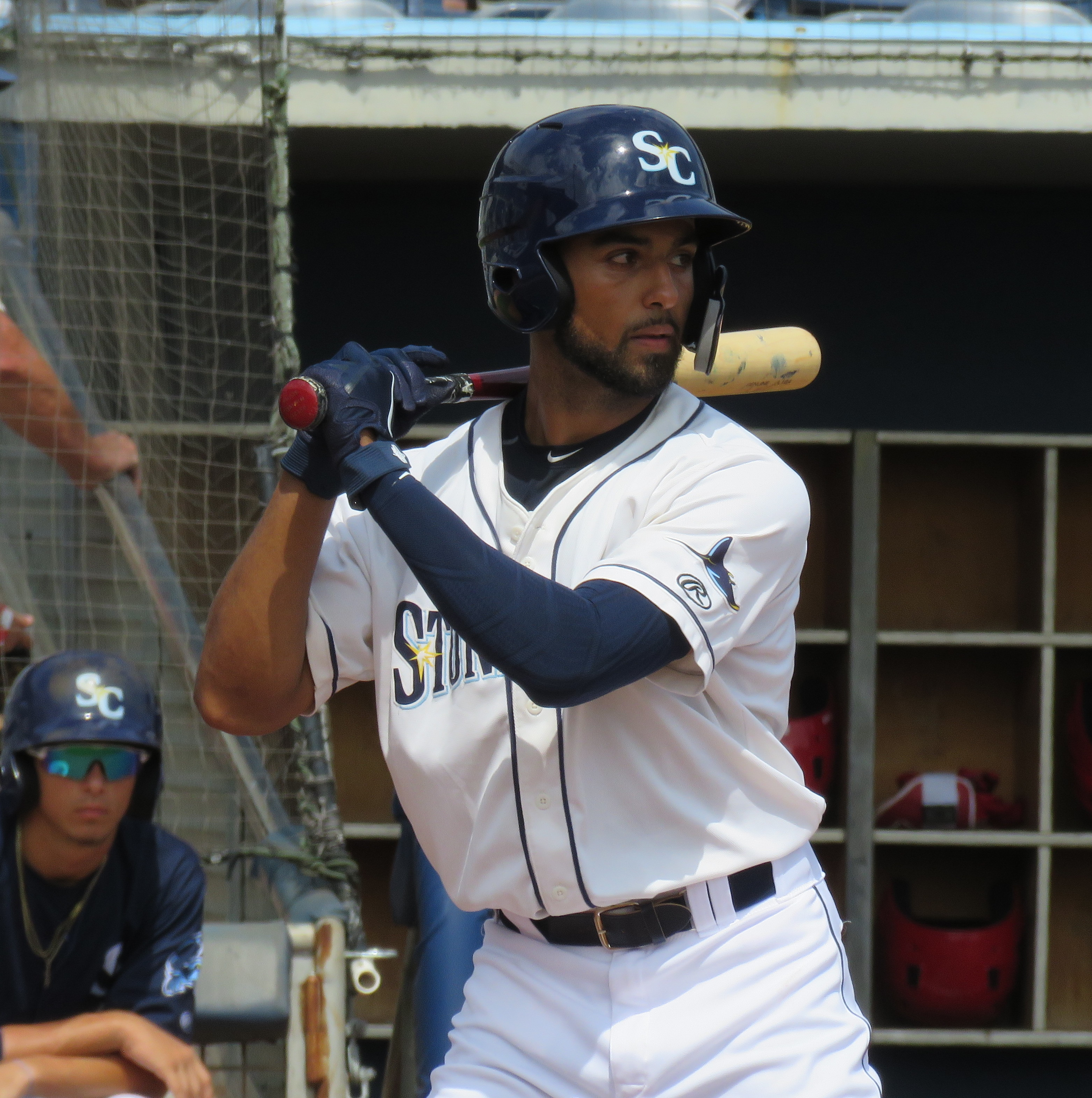
- Whitley with the Charlotte Stone Crabs in 2019
- Outfielder
- Born: March 13, 1997 (age 29); Melrose, Massachusetts, U.S.
- Bats: Right Throws: Right
- Stats at Baseball Reference

Garrett Alan Whitley (born March 13, 1997) is an American former professional baseball outfielder. He was drafted by the Tampa Bay Rays as the 13th selection in the first round of the 2015 Major League Baseball draft.

== Amateur career ==
Whitley attended Niskayuna High School in Niskayuna, New York. As a junior, he batted .474 with two home runs and 25 runs batted in (RBI). As a senior, he hit .356 with three home runs and 13 RBI.

Whitley was considered one of the top prospects for the 2015 MLB draft. He was drafted by the Tampa Bay Rays in the first round, 13th overall, of the draft. He committed to Wake Forest University to play college baseball but signed with the Rays.

== Professional career ==
=== Tampa Bay Rays ===
Whitley made his professional debut with the Gulf Coast Rays and was promoted to the Hudson Valley Renegades to end the season. He posted a combined .174 batting average with three home runs and 17 RBIs in 42 games between both teams. He returned to Hudson Valley in 2016, where he improved, batting .266 with one home run and 31 RBIs along with 21 stolen bases in 65 games. In 2017, he played for the Bowling Green Hot Rods where he posted a .249 batting average with 13 home runs, 61 RBIs, and 21 stolen bases over 104 games.

Whitley played with the Perth Heat for the 2017-18 Australian Baseball League season. He missed all of the 2018 season due to injury, but returned to play in 2019 with the Charlotte Stone Crabs, slashing .226/.339/.412 with ten home runs and forty RBIs over 114 games. He did not play a minor league game in 2020 due to the cancellation of the minor league season caused by the COVID-19 pandemic. Whitley split the 2021 season between the Montgomery Biscuits and Durham Bulls, slashing .229/.338/.444 with 13 home runs, 35 RBIs, and 12 stolen bases over 88 games. He elected free agency after the season's end.

=== Milwaukee Brewers ===
On December 9, 2021, Whitley signed a minor league contract with the Milwaukee Brewers. In 2022, Whitley played in 88 games split between the Double-A Biloxi Shuckers and Triple-A Nashville Sounds, hitting a cumulative .220/.355/.385 with 10 home runs, 35 RBI, and 19 stolen bases. He elected free agency following the season on November 10, 2022.

=== Philadelphia Phillies ===
On December 24, 2022, Whitley signed a minor league contract with the Philadelphia Phillies. He was assigned to the Double-A Reading Fightin Phils to begin the 2023 season, but struggled to a .161/.226/.232 batting line with one home run and 5 RBI in 15 games. He was released by the Phillies organization on May 25, 2023.
