= Alplaus, New York =

Hamlet in the state of New York, United States

- hamlet
- Location within the state of New York
- Coordinates: 42°51′10″N 73°53′58″W
- Country: United States
- State: New York
- County: Schenectady

Area
  - Water: 0.0 sq mi (0 km^{2})
- Elevation: 210 ft (64 m)
- Time zone: UTC-5 (Eastern (EST))
  - Summer (DST): UTC-4 (EDT)
- ZIP code: 12008
- Area code: 518

Alplaus is a hamlet located in Schenectady County, New York, United States. Its name is derived from the Dutch Aal Plaats, or "Place of the Eels."

Alplaus is in the southeast corner of the town of Glenville.

Some consider it part of the hamlet of East Glenville; however, it is generally recognized as a separate community. Alplaus is, however, part of the East Glenville census-designated place.

Census data for the ZIP Code Tabulation Area (ZCTA) associated with Alplaus for the 2000 census had a total population of 431 people in 175 households.

Alplaus has a Residents Association (ARA) which helps coordinate activities within the hamlet and manage relationships with town, county, and state government.

== Geography ==
Since Alplaus is not an incorporated area, its borders are not specific. Some consider the ZIP Code 12008 to define Alplaus, while others may say it is the Alplaus volunteer fire department (officially known as Glenville Fire District #2).

Alplaus is located at 42°51′19″N 73°53′58″W. It has an elevation of approximately 210 feet (64 m) at the Mohawk River.

Rexford, a hamlet in the town of Clifton Park in Saratoga County, borders Alplaus to the east. The Mohawk River borders on the south. Generally, the Glenridge and Schenectady County Airport represents the western border.

The major natural feature of the hamlet is the Alplaus Kill (creek), which is a tributary to the Mohawk River.

There is one main road (Alplaus Avenue), with several streets branching from it. On this road in the center of the hamlet are two important community facilities: the post office and the fire station.

== Airports ==
The Schenectady County Airport (FAA code KSCH) lies partially within Alplaus. The Stratton Air National Guard Base is located on this airport. The 109th Airlift Wing, based at Stratton, supports Arctic and Antarctic operations using C-130 aircraft.

The Wells Seaplane Base (FAA id 94D) is located at the Mohawk Marina near the mouth of the Alplaus Kill.

== History ==
In 1690, 114 Frenchmen and 96 Sault and Algonquin Indians encamped at the mouth of Alplaus Kill, prior to the Schenectady massacre.

From 1902 to 1941, the "longest trolley bridge in the world" crossed the Mohawk River at Alplaus. The trolley brought visitors from Schenectady to the fairgrounds in Rexford.

The Alplaus United Methodist Church was organized in 1914.

The Alplaus fire department was founded in 1930.

During World War II, the General Electric Company tested jet engines and electronic surveillance equipment at the Schenectady County Airport.

Kurt Vonnegut lived in Alplaus when he worked for General Electric in Schenectady, in the late 1940s. He was a member of the Alplaus Volunteer Fire Department. His recollections of the fire department's extra-loud siren can be found in his novel, God Bless You, Mr. Rosewater.
