= Gerald Solomon =

American politician (1930–2001)

Gerry Solomon
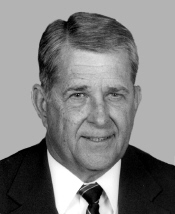

Chair of the House Rules Committee
- In office January 3, 1995 – January 3, 1999
- Preceded by: Joe Moakley
- Succeeded by: David Dreier

Member of the U.S. House of Representatives from New York
- In office January 3, 1979 – January 3, 1999
- Preceded by: Edward W. Pattison
- Succeeded by: John E. Sweeney
- Constituency: 29th district (1979–1983); 24th district (1983–1993); 22nd district (1993–1999)

Member of the New York State Assembly from the 110th district
- In office January 1, 1973 – December 31, 1978
- Preceded by: K. Daniel Haley
- Succeeded by: Joan B. Hague

Personal details
- Born: Gerald Brooks Hunt; August 14, 1930 Okeechobee, Florida, U.S.
- Died: October 26, 2001 (aged 71) Queensbury, New York, U.S.
- Resting place: Gerald B. H. Solomon Saratoga National Cemetery
- Party: Republican (before 1960, 1968–2001); Democratic (1960–1968)
- Spouse: Freda Parker (m. 1955)
- Children: 5
- Education: Siena College; St. Lawrence University

Military service
- Allegiance: United States
- Branch/service: United States Marine Corps; United States Marine Corps Reserve
- Years of service: 1951–1952 (Marines); 1952–1959 (Reserve)
- Rank: Lance Corporal
- Unit: 2nd Marine Division
- Solomon's voice Solomon on the importance of the U.S. military Recorded December 15, 1995

Gerald Brooks Hunt Solomon (August 14, 1930 – October 26, 2001) was an American businessman and politician most notable for his long service as a member of the United States House of Representatives from New York.

A veteran of the United States Marine Corps and the Marine Corps Reserve, and a successful insurance and investment broker, Solomon entered politics as a Democrat when he was elected town supervisor of Queensbury in 1968. He became a Republican in his first term, and won election to the New York State Assembly as a Republican in 1972.

After three terms in the Assembly, Solomon won election to the U.S. House. He became a high-profile advocate on defense and veterans' issues, and was best known for passage of his Solomon Amendment, which prohibited federal funding to colleges and universities that banned military recruiters from their campuses. After Republicans won control of the House in the 1994 elections, Solomon challenged Newt Gingrich for Speaker, but withdrew when it became clear that Gingrich had the support of a majority of the Republican caucus. Solomon became chairman of the House Rules Committee, a post he held from 1995 until retiring from the House in 1999. He was succeeded by fellow Republican John E. Sweeney.

After leaving Congress, Solomon operated a lobbying and strategic consulting firm. He died in Queensbury on October 26, 2001. He was buried at the national veteran's cemetery in Schuylerville, New York; he had spearheaded efforts to create the facility, which was named in his honor after his death.

== Early life ==
Solomon was born in Okeechobee, Florida, the son of Eugenia and Daniel Hunt. He was raised by his mother and stepfather, Seymour Solomon, and his family moved to New York when he was 15. He attended school in Florida and Delmar, New York, and graduated from Delmar's Bethlehem Central High School in 1948. He attended Siena College from 1949 to 1950 and St. Lawrence University from 1953 to 1954.

== Start of career ==
=== Military service ===
Solomon attempted to join the 1st Engineer Company of the United States Marine Corps Reserve in Albany, New York during the Korean War in 1950, but was deemed ineligible because of a childhood illness. He tried to enlist again in 1951 and was accepted. From 1951 to 1952, Solomon was a radio operator assigned to the 2nd Marine Division and stationed aboard the helicopter carrier USS Siboney in the Atlantic Ocean, and he attained the rank of private first class. He remained in the Marine Corps Reserve until 1959, and attained the rank of lance corporal.

=== Businessman ===
In the 1950s and 1960s Solomon was involved with M. Solomon, the women's clothing business owned by his stepfather. In the mid-1960s, he became a partner in the Associates of Glens Falls insurance company, as well as a partner in the Anchor Realty real estate brokerage. In addition he was president of Solomon, Veysey, Dixon, Gohn Associates, an investment brokerage. He also served as president of Queensbury's merchants association, and a member of the board of directors of the Glens Falls chamber of commerce. He was active in the Jaycees and the Boy Scouts, and was also involved in several charitable and civic causes. In addition, his fraternal memberships included the Marine Corps League, Masons, Shriners, and American Legion. The name recognition derived from his business and civic accomplishments provided Solomon with an entrée into local politics and government.

== Early political career ==
Originally a Democrat, In 1967, Solomon defeated incumbent John O. Webster to become Queensbury's Town Supervisor, which also made him a member of the Warren County Board of Supervisors. He was reelected in 1971 and served from January 1968 to December 1972, when he was succeeded by John A. DeLong Jr. In February 1968 he switched his party affiliation to Republican, arguing that he had been a Republican prior to the election of John F. Kennedy, that he joined the Democrats because he was inspired by Kennedy's goals and vision, but that he was returning to the Republicans because he perceived that Lyndon B. Johnson's presidency had moved too far from Kennedy's agenda. He was a member of the New York State Assembly from 1973 to 1978, sitting in the 180th, 181st and 182nd New York State Legislatures. As a fiscal conservative and advocate for limited government, Solomon was often at odds with the Assembly's Democratic majority.

== U.S. House of Representatives ==
In November 1978, Solomon was elected to the House of Representatives. In 1980, he was an early and avid supporter of Ronald Reagan's presidential campaign, and remained a Reagan stalwart, supporting his efforts to reduce taxes, revive the economy, halt Soviet expansionism and rebuild America's defenses. Solomon supported the line-item veto, a constitutional amendment to ban flag burning, a repeal of the Federal Assault Weapons Ban, and amendments that strengthened the Selective Service System. He was such an opponent of gun control that he once challenged fellow Representative Patrick J. Kennedy of Rhode Island to "step outside" to settle a dispute over the issue. Solomon attempted to run for Speaker of the House in 1994 but withdrew in favor of Newt Gingrich.

Solomon also supported creation of the Saratoga National Cemetery, which was named the Gerald B. H. Solomon Saratoga National Cemetery in his honor following his death. In addition, he was a longtime advocate of elevating the Veterans Administration to cabinet status, which resulted in creation of the United States Department of Veterans Affairs. Solomon was also a leader of former Marines in Congress who fought the construction of the United States Air Force Memorial through litigation and legislation at a site they considered to be too close to the USMC War Memorial. (The Air Force Memorial was ultimately constructed at a different location, on the grounds of Fort Myer near Arlington National Cemetery.)

=== Solomon Amendment ===
Solomon was also the originator and sponsor of the Solomon Amendment, a controversial amendment to United States Code that precluded the receipt of federal government funds by colleges and universities unless they provided equal access to military recruiters as they did private employers. The policy was a response to rules at many American law schools which excluded employers who discriminated based on categories such as sexual orientation. The Amendment was subject to extensive litigation in 2003 by plaintiffs; the Forum for Academic and Institutional Rights (FAIR) and the Society of American Law Teachers. This litigation included FAIR v. Rumsfeld, 390 F.3d 219 (3rd Cir. 2004). On March 6, 2006, the United States Supreme Court ruled in favor of the military and upheld the Solomon Amendment.

=== Rules Committee Chair ===
Solomon was named ranking Republican of the House Rules Committee in 1991. Even though Jimmy Quillen of Tennessee had far more seniority, the other Republicans on the committee thought Solomon was a more accomplished legislator. When he lost his bid for the Speakership in 1995, he became chairman of the Rules Committee, thus making him one of the three or four most powerful members of the House. He served as chairman from 1995 to 1999, when he retired.

In his district, which ran from the Hudson Valley near Poughkeepsie into the Adirondacks, including Lake Placid, he was a popular and respected figure. In the later years of his tenure he consistently drew the highest total vote of any member of the New York delegation. He was well known for his strong constituent work, and for facilitating federal investment in his mostly rural district, including dozens of housing projects for low income elderly.

After leaving Congress he formed the Solomon Group, a Washington consulting and lobbying business.

== Death and burial ==
On October 26, 2001, Solomon died of congestive heart failure at his home in Queensbury at the age of 71. His ability to maintain friendships across political lines resulted in several Democratic members of Congress attending his funeral, including Representative Charles Rangel, a fellow veteran. Solomon was buried at the national cemetery which is named for him.

== Family ==
In 1955 Solomon married Freda Parker of Monongahela, Pennsylvania. They were the parents of five children, Susan, Daniel, Robert, Linda and Jeffrey. In addition to his wife and children, Solomon was survived by six grandchildren and his brother Richard.

== General Reference ==
- Gerald B. H. Solomon Papers, 1978-1999. M.E. Grenander Department of Special Collections and Archives, University Libraries, University at Albany, State University of New York (hereafter referred to as the Solomon Papers).

== Sources ==
=== Newspapers ===
- "Seeks Election as Supervisor". Glens Falls Post-Star. Glens Falls, NY. May 11, 1967 – via Newspapers.com.
- "Solomon Elected By 59 Votes". The Post-Star. Glens Falls, New York. November 14, 1967. p. 3 – via Newspapers.com.
- "Supervisor Solomon Deserts Democrats; Enrolls in GOP". Glens Falls Post-Star. Glens Falls, NY. February 28, 1968 – via Newspapers.com.
- "Nearly All Incumbents Win Reelection to Board of Supervisors". The Post-Star. Glens Falls, New York. November 3, 1971. pp. 1, 12 – via Newspapers.com.
- "Initial Meeting Scheduled Today". Glens Falls Post-Star. Glens Falls, NY. November 17, 1971 – via Newspapers.com.
- Coleman, Lee (December 16, 1972). "Snowmobile Access Urged". The Post-Star. Glens Falls, New York. p. 13 – via Newspapers.com.
- Coleman, Lee (January 2, 1973). "Austin Appointed Supervisor; Little Is Town Attorney". The Post-Star. Glens Falls, New York. p. 1 – via Newspapers.com.
- "House votes to repeal assault weapons ban". The Times Recorder. Zanesville, OH. Associated Press. March 23, 1996 – via Newspapers.com.
- Isackson, Noah (September 18, 1997). "Marines Object To Site Of Air Force Memorial". Chicago Tribune. Chicago, IL.
- LEGI-SLATE News Service staff (April 24, 1998). "Key Player: Gerald B.H. Solomon". The Washington Post. Washington, DC.
- Pearson, Richard (October 28, 2001). "Rep. Gerald Solomon Dies". The Washington Post. Washington, DC.
- "Gerald B. Solomon - A Career In Public Service". The Post-Star. Glens Falls, NY. October 27, 2001.
- Marquis, Christopher (October 27, 2001). "Gerald Solomon, 71; Spurred Conservative Causes in House". The New York Times. New York, NY – via TimesMachine.
- "Gerald Solomon, longtime local congressman, dead at 71". Daily Freeman. Kingston, NY. October 27, 2001.
- "Gerald Brooks Hunt 'Jerry' Solomon, 1930–2001". The Post-Star. Glens Falls, NY. October 28, 2001.
- Randall, Thom (November 1, 2001). "Jerry Solomon laid to rest". The Post-Star. Glens Falls, NY.
- "U.S. Rep. Gerald Solomon Honored as Deceased Veteran of the Month". Glens Falls Post-Star. Glens Falls, NY. November 30, 2002.
- Denniston, Lyle (March 6, 2006). "Court upholds "Solomon Amendment"". SCOTUSblog. Washington, DC.

=== Internet ===
- Lamere, Clifford (August 31, 2017). "Obituaries for Deceased Graduates of Bethlehem Central High School, Delmar, New York". CliffLamere.com. Albany, NY: Cliff Lamere.
- "Air Force Memorial Foundation". AFA.org. Arlington, VA: Air Force Association.
- National Cemetery Administration. "Nationwide Gravesite Locator Entry, Gerald Brooks Hunt Solomon". VA.gov. Washington, DC: U.S. Department of Veterans Affairs. Archived from the original on June 1, 2019.
- "U.S. Marine Corps Muster Rolls, 1798–1958, July 1952 Entry for Gerald B. H. Solomon". Ancestry.com. Provo, Utah: Ancestry.com, LLC. July 20, 1952.
- "U.S. Marine Corps Muster Rolls, 1798-1958, July 1954 Entry for Gerald Solomon". Ancestry.com. Provo, Utah: Ancestry.com, LLC. July 20, 1954.
- "UAlbany Libraries Acquire U.S. Representative Gerald Solomon Papers". Albany.edy. Albany, NY: University at Albany. May 22, 2003.

=== Books ===
- Kalb, Deborah, ed. (2016). Guide to U.S. Elections (Seventh ed.). Washington, DC: CQ Press. ISBN 978-1-4833-8036-0 – via Google Books.
- U.S. Congress Joint Committee on Printing (1979). Official Congressional Directory. Washington, DC: US Government Printing Office.
- How Congress Works. Thousand Oaks, CA: CQ Press. 2013. ISBN 978-1-6087-1911-2 – via Google Books.

U.S. House of Representatives
Preceded by Edward W. Pattison	Member of the U.S. House of Representatives from New York's 29th congressional district 1979–1983	Succeeded by Frank Horton
Preceded by Richard Ottinger	Member of the U.S. House of Representatives from New York's 24th congressional district 1983–1993	Succeeded by John M. McHugh
Preceded by John Paul Hammerschmidt	Ranking Member of the House Veterans' Affairs Committee; 1987–1989	Succeeded by Bob Stump
Preceded by Jimmy Quillen	Ranking Member of the House Rules Committee; 1991–1995	Succeeded by Joe Moakley
Preceded by Ben Gilman	Member of the U.S. House of Representatives from New York's 22nd congressional district 1993–1999	Succeeded by John E. Sweeney
Preceded by Joe Moakley	Chair of the House Rules Committee; 1995–1999	Succeeded by David Dreier
