= Senator Dalessandro =

Senator Dalessandro may refer to:

- Andrea Dalessandro, Arizona State Senate
- Peter J. Dalessandro (1918–1997), New York State Senate
