= 105th Infantry Regiment (United States) =

105th Infantry Regiment (2nd New York)
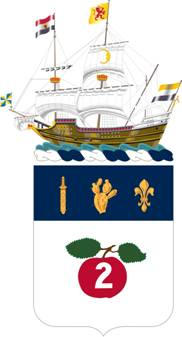
- Coat of Arms.
- Active: 1898; 1916-1919; 1921-1945; 1947-present
- Country: United States of America
- Allegiance: New York
- Branch: New York Army National Guard
- Type: Infantry regiment
- Mottos: Possumus et vincemus (We Are Able and Will Conquer)
- Engagements: World War I; Battle of the Lys (1918); Second Battle of the Somme (1918); Meuse-Argonne Offensive; World War II; Battle of Makin; Battle of Saipan; Battle of Okinawa

The 105th Infantry Regiment is an infantry regiment of the New York Army National Guard that saw combat in World War I and World War II. Originally, it was known as the 2nd New York Volunteer Infantry Regiment, but it was redesignated in 1916. The 105th fought as a part of the 27th Infantry Division during both World Wars, and was highly decorated for its actions during the Battle of Saipan, where its dogged defense against the largest Japanese Banzai charge of the war decimated its ranks.

== Spanish–American War ==
The 105th Infantry traces its origins to the 2nd New York Volunteer Infantry Regiment, first formed in 1898. (An earlier 2nd New York Volunteer Infantry, known as the Troy Regiment, had served in the Civil War; this was a different regiment with no connection to the later 2nd.) On 17 May 1898, the 2nd New York Infantry was reformed for service in the Spanish–American War.

== World War I ==
The 2nd New York was mustered up again for the Border War in 1916, and was thus prepared for when the US Army mobilized for the First World War in April 1917. The 2nd New York was redesignated as the 105th Infantry Regiment and was assigned to the 53rd Brigade of the 27th Infantry Division. Serving with the 105th in the 53rd Brigade was the 106th Infantry Regiment. At the beginning of the war, the 105th had a strength of 2,720 officers and men. The regiment shipped out for France in May 1918, and upon arrival, was sent to the East Poperinghe Line with the rest of the 27th Division. On 25 July 1918, the 105th rotated into the frontline to relieve elements of the British 6th Division. German offensives in the spring of 1918 had penetrated deep into the allied lines, and created salients near Amiens and Hazebrouck. On 31 August 1918, the Ypres-Lys Offensive commenced.

The assault began with the 105th on the left side of the advance (abreast with the 106th Infantry), and fighting continued for a few days until the regiment was relieved by the British 41st Division. The Second Somme Offensive began on 24 September 1918 and concluded on 21 October 1918. The two regiments of the 53rd Brigade made moderate gains near Guillemont, but were thrown back by a German counterattack. It was here, near Ronssoy, that 1LT William B. Turner earned the Medal of Honor. On 27 September 1918, 1LT Turner was leading his men in an attack, under terrific artillery and machine-gun fire, after they had become separated from the rest of the company in the darkness. He singlehandedly charged enemy machine-gun positions and led his men through three lines of trenches. He managed to capture a fourth and final trench-line, but was killed when the Germans counterattacked. On 29 September, the 105th attempted to capture a formidable German strongpoint known as "The Knoll," but were stalled by machine-gun fire from elevated German positions.

On 1 October, the 27th Division was moved to Prémont to serve with the II Corps and lead an assault against on 17 October 1918.

== Interwar period ==
The 105th Infantry arrived at the port of New York on 6 March 1919 on the USS Leviathan and was demobilized on 1 April 1919 at Camp Upton, New York. Per the terms of the National Defense Act of 1920, the 105th Infantry was reconstituted in the National Guard on 30 December 1920, assigned to the 27th Division, and allotted to the state of New York. It was reorganized on 1 June 1921 by redesignation of the 2nd Infantry, New York National Guard (organized 3 August 1919; headquarters organized 3 February 1920 and federally recognized at Troy, New York) as the 105th Infantry. The regiment conducted annual summer training most years at Camp Smith, Peekskill, New York, 1921–38.

== World War II ==
While Germany and Fascist Italy were in the process of conquering most of Europe in 1939 and 1940, and the Empire of Japan was grabbing territory in the Pacific and China, the United States felt unprepared in the event war was necessary to combat the Axis powers and began mobilizing its army in response. The Selective Training and Service Act of 1940, which allowed the government to draft US citizens, was passed, and all available National Guard Divisions were inducted into Federal Service within a year. The 105th Infantry Regiment was mustered for federal service and assigned to the 27th Infantry Division on 15 October 1940.

=== Composition in 1940 ===
- Headquarters: Troy
- Headquarters Company: Syracuse
- Antitank Company Whitehall
- Service Company: Troy
- Medical Detachment: Troy
- Headquarters, 1st Battalion: Troy
- Headquarters Detachment, 1st Battalion: Hoosick Falls
  - Co. A: Troy
  - Co. B: Cohoes
  - Co. C: Troy
  - Co. D: Troy
- Headquarters, 2nd Battalion: Schenectady
- Headquarters Detachment, 2nd Battalion: Schenectady
  - Co. E: Schenectady
  - Co. F: Schenectady
  - Co G: Amsterdam
  - Co. H: Schenectady
- Headquarters, 3rd Battalion: Schenectady
- Headquarters Detachment, 3rd Battalion: Saranac Lake
  - Co. I: Malone
  - Co. K: Glens Falls
  - Co. L: Saratoga Springs
  - Co. M: Gloversville

The regiment moved to Fort McClellan, Alabama after it was inducted, and then to Hawaii on 17 March 1942, after the Attack on Pearl Harbor. There, they trained for combat in the Pacific Theater against the Imperial Japanese Army.

=== Makin ===
The 105th Infantry Regiment earned its "baptism by fire" on Butaritari Island on 20 November 1943. Here, during the Battle of Makin, the 3rd Battalion (3-105) made an assault landing alongside the 165th Infantry Regiment. As the landing craft approached the beach, they began to receive small-arms and machine-gun fire from the island's defenders. The assault troops were also surprised to discover that even though they were approaching the beach at high tide as planned, a miscalculation of the lagoon's depth caused their small boats to go aground, forcing them to walk the final 250 yards (230 m) to the beach in waist-deep water. Equipment and weapons were lost or water-soaked, but only three men were killed approaching the beach, mainly because the defenders chose to make their final stand farther inland along the tank barriers. 3-105 fought with the 165th Infantry for the remainder of the battle, which lasted 4 days and cost the Americans 66 killed and 185 wounded. On 24 November 1943, the entire regiment left the atoll for Hawaii, where they arrived on 2 December 1943.

=== Saipan ===
Early on 18 June, the regiment assisted the 165th Infantry Regiment with clearing the island's southern airfield, Aslito Airfield, and took up defensive positions that night on the east of the field. On 19 June, 1-105 advanced on Nafutan Point under the command of LTC William J. O'Brien but became bogged down, and despite armored support and flanking maneuvers, the Japanese position was too strong. 1-105 was unable to breach the Japanese defenses at Nafutan point by 21 June, and were ordered to move north in order to press the advance, and 2-105 was slated with reducing the Nafutan position. At this point of the battle, the three American divisions moved north abreast of each other; the 2nd Marine Division advanced up the west coast, the 4th Marine Division advanced up the east coast, and the 27th Infantry Division advanced up the center of the island. At Nafutan Point, the 1,200 remaining Japanese attacked the 600 men of 2–105, but they were defeated when 3-105 arrived to help, and Nafutan was finally declared secure on 27 June. Meanwhile, on 23 June 1944, the units of the 27th Division advanced up what the soldiers called "Death Valley" and "Purple Heart Ridge" toward Mount Tapotchau. Elements of the 165th Infantry and 1-105 joined with elements of the 23rd Marine Regiment to capture the villages of Donnay and Hasigoru from 26 to 27 June. This high ground, known as "Obie's Ridge," was held by the 105th against repeated Japanese counterattacks.

While occupying Obie's Ridge, 1-105 was ordered to move up to 3-105's position and join the left flank of the 165th Infantry, and the right flank of the 106th Infantry. However, this required crossing 1,700 yards of open terrain. On 2 July, 1-105 marched at double time across the open ground and dug in at their objective. On 4 July, the 105th had secured Flores Point, and 2–105, which had been fighting at Nafutan Point, rejoined the regiment. The regiment attacked up the Tanapag Plain until they were roughly 1,200 yards south of Makunshka. This action on the Tanapag Plain has been studied by the United States Army Center of Military History and is well documented. 2-105 was dug in to the west of the railroad, but there was a considerable gap between the battalion, so LTC O'Brien concentrated his battalion's anti-tank weapons and machine-guns near the divide. During the evening and night of 6 July, the Japanese launched minor probing attacks against the 105th's lines to find weak points, and at 0445 on 7 July, they launched the largest Banzai charge of the war; it is estimated over 4,000 Japanese took part in the charge simultaneously. This charge hit the 105th directly and violently, and the two lead battalions were overrun. LTC O'Brien led the defense in the 1-105 area, with a pistol in each hand and even manning a nearby .50 Caliber machine-gun until he was killed. When his body was found, there were 30 dead Japanese around him, and he received a posthumous Medal of Honor. When the carnage of the final charge finally ended, 2,295 dead Japanese lay in front of the 105th's positions, and another 2,016 lay intermingled or in the rear of the 105th's positions for a total of 4,311 dead. US casualties were also heavy, and 1-105 and 2-105 suffered 406 KIA and 512 WIA. In 1–105, Lieutenant John Mulhearn of B Co. and Captain Lee G. Brown of C Co. were the only surviving officers, and in 2–105, all the company commanders and the entire battalion staff were killed, but the battalion commander (Maj. McCarthy) survived. During the fighting on 7 July, Private Thomas Baker fought with the Japanese although seriously wounded early in the attack, he refused to be evacuated and continued to fight in the close-range battle until running out of ammunition. When a comrade was wounded while trying to carry him to safety, Baker insisted that he be left behind. At his request, his comrades left him propped against a tree and gave him a pistol, which had eight bullets remaining. When American forces retook the position, they found the empty pistol and eight dead Japanese soldiers around Baker's body. Pvt. Baker received a posthumous Medal of Honor. Capt. Ben L. Salomon was the 105th's regimental dentist officer but on Saipan he was quickly needed as a surgeon. Salomon's aid station was set up only 50 yards behind the forward foxhole line on 7 July. Fighting was heavy and the Japanese assault soon overran the perimeter, then the aid station. Salomon was able to kill the enemy that entered the hospital tent and ordered the wounded to be evacuated, while he stayed to cover their withdrawal. When an Army team returned to the site days later, Salomon's body was found slumped over a machine gun with the bodies of 98 enemy troops piled up in front of his position. His body had 76 bullet wounds and many bayonet wounds, up to 24 of which may have been received while he was still alive. Salomon eventually received the Medal of Honor in 2002, and it is believed that the long delay was due to discriminatory practices arising from Salomon's Jewish faith. The fighting on 7 July decimated the regiment, and the memory of that night would define the character of the survivors, and set forth a courageous tradition for the future. The badly mauled 105th continued operations on Saipan against an enemy that was all but used up and the island was eventually declared secure on 9 July 1944.

=== Okinawa ===
Once the Battle of Saipan was completed, the 105th Infantry Regiment was assigned to garrison the island from 15 to 30 July. They then moved to Espiritu Santo for some much needed R&R on 4 September. The regiment had slowly begun refilling its ranks with replacement officers and men, but were definitely still understrength and weary by the time they departed for Okinawa on 25 March 1945. 3-105 was a little better off than their two sister battalions, so they were selected to assault the island of Tsugen Shima. In this engagement, on 10 April 1945, the Japanese lost 243 men killed while thirty escaped, and the Americans lost fourteen dead. These would be the opening shots of the 105th's involvement in Operation Iceberg. The 105th landed on Okinawa on 12 April, and moved to the south where they confronted the Shuri Line. The 27th Infantry Division comprised the XXIV Corps' western flank, and the 105th attacked the Japanese strongpoint at Kakazu Ridge, but the attack faltered. Here in southern Okinawa, the 105th was mired in mud, torrential rainfall, and static warfare reminiscent of the First World War. After pitched fighting across the Shuri Line, the exhausted 27th Infantry Division was relieved by the 1st Marine Division. According to one Marine veteran who relieved his Army compatriots; "Boy, they looked like hell coming off that line." After suffering heavy casualties at Okinawa, the beleaguered men of the 105th arrived in Japan on 12 September 1945 to serve a garrison role, and the regiment was inactivated on 12 December 1945 when it returned home to the United States.

=== Cold War ===
The 105th Infantry was reorganized on 4 March 1947 with headquarters at Troy, New York. As of 2001, the 1st Battalion was active with headquarters at Schenectady, New York, as an element of the 27th Infantry Brigade (Light).
