= William J. O'Brien (Medal of Honor) =

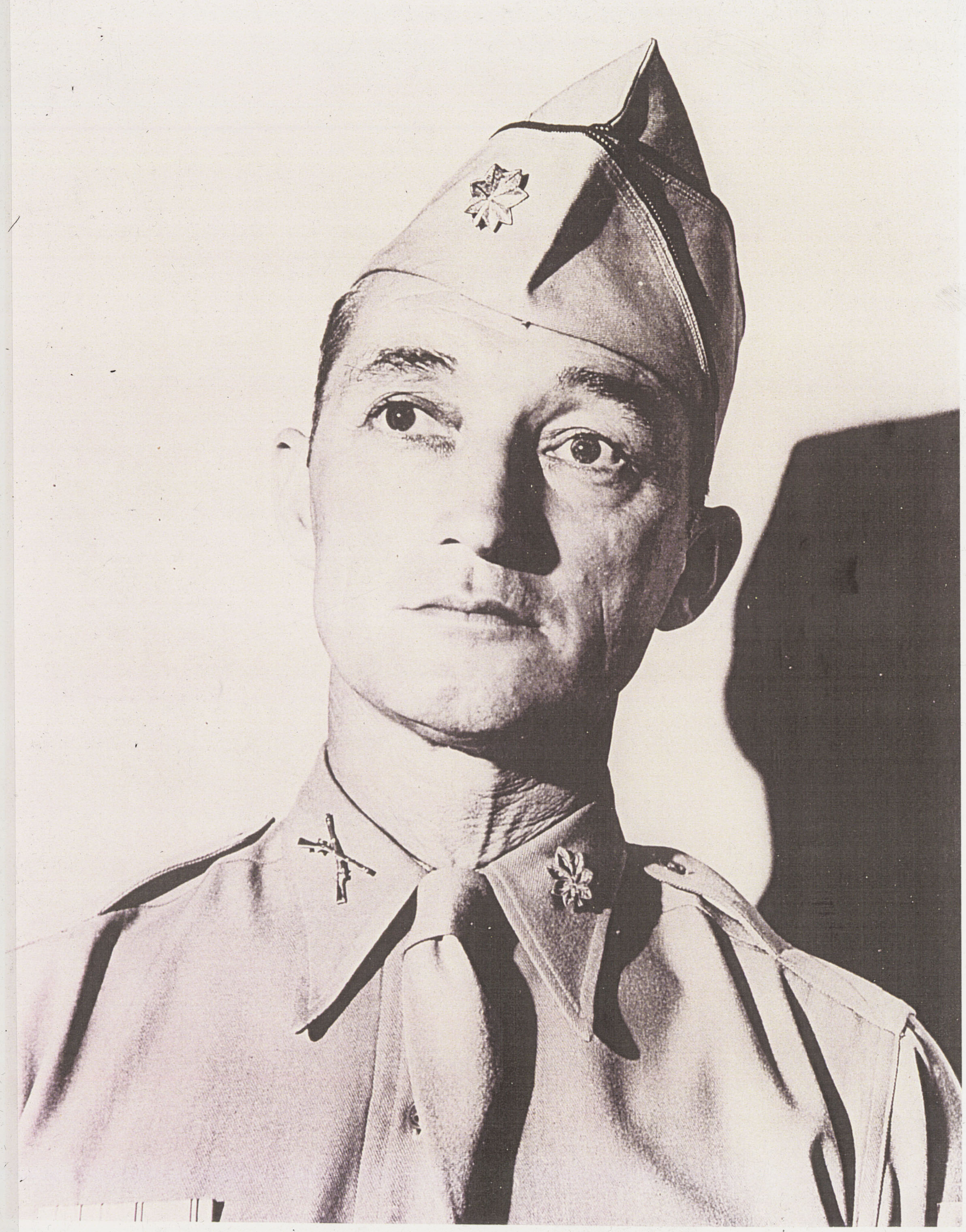
- Born: September 25, 1899; Troy, New York, US
- Died: July 7, 1944 (aged 44–45); Saipan, Northern Mariana Islands
- Burial place: Saint Peter's Cemetery Troy, New York
- Military career
- Allegiance: United States
- Branch: United States Army
- Rank: Lieutenant Colonel
- Commands: 1st Battalion, 105th Infantry Regiment, 27th Infantry Division
- Conflicts: World War II • Battle of Saipan †
- Awards: Medal of Honor

William Joseph O'Brien (September 25, 1899 - July 7, 1944) was a United States Army officer and a recipient of the United States military's highest decoration—the Medal of Honor—for his actions in World War II during the Battle of Saipan.

== Biography ==
In 1917, O'Brien enlisted in the New York State Guard, which was the replacement to the New York National Guard that had been activated and sent to Europe during World War I. He was discharged in 1922, and after some time, he enlisted in the New York National Guard, which had returned to New York after the war.

O'Brien was commissioned as an officer in 1926 and was promoted to captain by 1939. He married his wife, Mary, and had a son, William Jr, sometime during this period.

In October 1940, the New York National Guard mobilized for active duty with the Army's 27th Infantry Division. O'Brien was promoted to major in 1942 and then to lieutenant colonel by April 1943, when he was assigned to command the 1st Battalion, 105th Infantry Regiment, 27th Infantry Division.

On June 21, 1944, on Saipan in the Marianas Islands, he braved enemy fire to reach several American tanks which were unknowingly firing on their own troops. The next week, on June 28, he oversaw and personally led an attack on a Japanese held ridge. On July 7 his battalion came under attack from a much larger enemy force, the largest banzai charge of the Pacific War. He refused to leave the front lines even after being wounded and continued to rally his men until being overrun and killed. He was posthumously awarded the Medal of Honor on May 9, 1945, for his actions throughout the battle for Saipan.

O'Brien, aged 44 at his death, was buried at Saint Peter's Cemetery in his hometown of Troy, New York.

== Medal of Honor citation ==
Lieutenant Colonel O'Brien's official Medal of Honor citation reads:

For conspicuous gallantry and intrepidity at the risk of his life above and beyond the call of duty at Saipan, Marianas Islands, from 20 June through 7 July 1944. When assault elements of his platoon were held up by intense enemy fire, Lt. Col. O'Brien ordered 3 tanks to precede the assault companies in an attempt to knock out the strongpoint. Due to direct enemy fire the tanks' turrets were closed, causing the tanks to lose direction and to fire into our own troops. Lt. Col. O'Brien, with complete disregard for his own safety, dashed into full view of the enemy and ran to the leader's tank, and pounded on the tank with his pistol butt to attract 2 of the tank's crew and, mounting the tank fully exposed to enemy fire, Lt. Col. O'Brien personally directed the assault until the enemy strongpoint had been liquidated. On 28 June 1944, while his platoon was attempting to take a bitterly defended high ridge in the vicinity of Donnay, Lt. Col. O'Brien arranged to capture the ridge by a double envelopment movement of 2 large combat battalions. He personally took control of the maneuver. Lt. Col. O'Brien crossed 1,200 yards of sniper-infested underbrush alone to arrive at a point where 1 of his platoons was being held up by the enemy. Leaving some men to contain the enemy he personally led 4 men into a narrow ravine behind, and killed or drove off all the Japanese manning that strongpoint. In this action he captured 5 machine guns and one 77-mm. fieldpiece. Lt. Col. O'Brien then organized the 2 platoons for night defense and against repeated counterattacks directed them. Meanwhile he managed to hold ground. On 7 July 1944 his battalion and another battalion were attacked by an overwhelming enemy force estimated at between 3,000 and 5,000 Japanese. With bloody hand-to-hand fighting in progress everywhere, their forward positions were finally overrun by the sheer weight of the enemy numbers. With many casualties and ammunition running low, Lt. Col. O'Brien refused to leave the front lines. Striding up and down the lines, he fired at the enemy with a pistol in each hand and his presence there bolstered the spirits of the men, encouraged them in their fight and sustained them in their heroic stand. Even after he was seriously wounded, Lt. Col. O'Brien refused to be evacuated and after his pistol ammunition was exhausted, he manned a .50 caliber machine gun, mounted on a jeep, and continued firing. When last seen alive he was standing upright firing into the Japanese hordes that were then enveloping him. Some time later his body was found surrounded by enemy he had killed. His valor was consistent with the highest traditions of the service.

== Awards and decorations ==

Badge	Combat Infantryman Badge		
1st row	Medal of Honor		Bronze Star Medal
2nd row	Purple Heart	World War I Victory Medal	American Defense Service Medal
3rd row	American Campaign Medal	Asiatic-Pacific Campaign Medal with 1 Campaign star	World War II Victory Medal

== Honors ==
The U.S. Army ship USAT Col. William J. O'Brien, which served in the Pacific Ocean at the end of World War II, was named in his honor.

In November 2009, a memorial honoring O'Brien and fellow Troy natives Major General Ogden J. Ross and Sergeant Thomas Baker was installed in the Rensselaer County office building. Baker, like O'Brien a member of the 105th Infantry, was also posthumously awarded the Medal of Honor for his actions on Saipan; he died there within hours of O'Brien. Ross was a former commander of the 105th Infantry and an assistant divisional commander during the Battle of Saipan. The memorial includes replicas of the Medals of Honor awarded to O'Brien and Baker.

== See also ==
- List of Medal of Honor recipients for World War II
