= Solomon Amendment =

Several American law provisions sponsored by Gerald B.H. Solomon

The term Solomon Amendment has been applied to several provisions of U.S. law originally sponsored by U.S. Representative Gerald B. H. Solomon (R-NY).

The 1982 Solomon Amendment was an amendment to a federal education bill that made compliance with the registration requirements of the Military Selective Service Act a condition of eligibility for federal financial aid for higher education, and required applicants for aid to certify their compliance with any applicable Selective Service registration requirement. Rep. Solomon subsequently sponsored other "Solomon Amendments" making Selective Service registration a condition of federal employment and various other federal programs.

The 1996 Solomon Amendment is the popular name of 10 U.S.C. § 983, a United States federal law that allows the Secretary of Defense to deny federal grants (including research grants) to institutions of higher education if they prohibit or prevent ROTC or military recruitment on campus.

== History ==
In the 1980s, U.S. Representative Gerald B. H. Solomon (R-NY) sponsored a series of "Solomon amendments" that conditioned eligibility for federal financial aid for higher education and job training, federal government employment, and other federal benefits on certification by the individual that they either had registered with the Selective Service System or were not required to register. One of these laws was successfully challenged in federal District Court in 1983 on the grounds that it determined guilt and inflicted punishment without judicial process. The Supreme Court reversed that decision, in part because the plaintiffs were still young enough to "cure" their ineligibility by registering, in Selective Service System v. Minnesota Public Interest Research Group (1984). In 2012, the Supreme Court heard a case involving a challenge to the Solomon Amendment requiring Selective Service registration as a condition of Federal employment, Elgin et al. v. U.S. Treasury et al., 567 U.S. 1. The named plaintiff in that case had been fired from a Federal job he had held for many years, after he was too old to be allowed to register. The Supreme Court decided the case on procedural grounds, and has yet to rule on the Constitutionality of the Solomon Amendments as applied to men over age 26. "From 1982 to 2021, males were required to register with Selective Service System in order to receive Title IV Federal student aid.... This requirement was eliminated by the FY 2021 Consolidated Appropriations Act.... [F]ailing to register with Selective Service System no longer impacts students’ eligibility for Title IV student aid. Effective July 1, 2022, applicants will no longer be able to register with Selective Service System via the FAFSA."

The Solomon Amendment relating to ROTC and military recruiting was passed in 1996. It denied federal grants from 8 federal agencies, including research grants, to colleges and universities that prohibit or prevent the U.S. armed forces from recruiting on campus in a manner "at least equal in quality and scope" as other employers or that fail to allow for ROTC programs as part of their academic programs subject to the same standards as other academic programs. It was recodified in 1999. The law was amended in 2002 to cover recruiting by the Coast Guard as part of the Department of Homeland Security. It also provides an exception for any institution with "a longstanding policy of pacifism based on historical religious affiliation."

It was revised in later years, most importantly in 1999, when Rep. Barney Frank (D-MA) sponsored an exemption for financial aid funding (Pub L. 106-79 Sec. 8120), and again in 2001, when the Republican leadership of the House Armed Services Committee included language denying all federal funding to a university if any of its schools blocked access to recruiters. This alteration significantly strengthened the reach of the Solomon Amendment, since recruiters were most often denied access to law schools, which receive little federal money.

== Constitutional challenge ==
Since 1991, the Association of American Law Schools, the principal consortium of United States law schools, required that all of its member institutions establish a policy prohibiting discrimination on the basis of sexual orientation and that member schools require the same policy of any employer to which it grants access for recruiting employees. Many law schools used to oppose military recruitment on campus because the military's "don't ask, don't tell" policy denying employment in the military to open gays and lesbians contradicted their non-discrimination policies.

In 2004, the U.S. Third Circuit Court of Appeals found for the Forum for Academic and Institutional Rights, a group representing law schools, led by Professor Kent Greenfield of Boston College Law School, opposed to the presence of military recruiters on campus.

On appeal, the U.S. Supreme Court in Rumsfeld v. FAIR upheld the Solomon Amendment in a unanimous decision on March 6, 2006. Chief Justice John Roberts, writing for the majority, wrote: "As a general matter, the Solomon Amendment regulates conduct, not speech. It affects what law schools must do—afford equal access to military recruiters—not what they may or may not say."

At least two institutions, Vermont Law School, and William Mitchell College of Law, in response to the military's "don't ask, don't tell" policy had declined to allow military recruiting on campus. These schools received smaller allocations of federal funds compared to large research universities, making it more feasible to forgo the federal funding. With the repeal of "don't ask, don't tell" in 2011, both schools removed their bans on campus military recruiting.
