= William L. Nelson (Medal of Honor) =

William Nelson
- Born: February 22, 1918; Dover, Delaware
- Died: April 24, 1943 (aged 25) near Sedjenane, French Tunisia
- Burial place: Silverbrook Cemetery, Wilmington, Delaware
- Military career
- Allegiance: United States
- Branch: United States Army
- Service years: 1941–1943
- Rank: Sergeant
- Unit: 60th Infantry Regiment
- Conflicts: World War II; Tunisian campaign; Battle of Sedjenane †
- Awards: Medal of Honor; Purple Heart

Sergeant William Lloyd Nelson (February 22, 1918–April 24, 1943) was an American combat soldier who was posthumously awarded the Medal of Honor, the nation's highest decoration for valor, for his actions on April 24, 1943, during World War II.

Nelson was born in Delaware, on February 22, 1918. Drafted into the United States Army in January 1941, he trained at Fort Dix, New Jersey.

Nelson was killed in action during the final weeks of the Tunisian campaign while serving as a sergeant and a member of the 2nd Battalion, 60th Infantry Regiment, part of the 9th Infantry Division. Nelson is interred at Silverbrook Cemetery in Wilmington, Delaware

== Medal of Honor ==
His Medal of Honor citation read as follows:

For conspicuous gallantry and intrepidity at risk of life, above and beyond the call of duty in action involving actual conflict at Djebel Dardys, northwest of Sedjenane, Tunisia. On the morning of April 24, 1943, Sgt. WILLIAM NELSON led his section of heavy mortars to a forward position where he placed his guns and men. Under intense enemy artillery, mortar, and small-arms fire, he advanced alone to a chosen observation position from which he directed the laying of a concentrated mortar barrage which successfully halted an initial enemy counterattack. Although mortally wounded in the accomplishment of his mission, and with his duty clearly completed, Sgt. WILLIAM NELSON crawled to a still more advanced observation point and continued to direct the fire of his section. Dying of hand grenade wounds and only 50 yards from the enemy, Sgt. WILLIAM NELSON encouraged his section to continue their fire and by doing so they took a heavy toll of enemy lives. The skill which Sgt. WILLIAM NELSON displayed in this engagement, his courage, and self-sacrificing devotion to duty and heroism resulting in the loss of his life, was a priceless inspiration to our Armed Forces and were in keeping with the highest tradition of the U.S. Army.|William Nelson, United States Army

== Awards and decorations ==

Badge	Combat Infantryman Badge		
1st row	Medal of Honor		Bronze Star Medal Retroactively Awarded, 1947
2nd row	Purple Heart	Army Good Conduct Medal	American Defense Service Medal
3rd row	American Campaign Medal	European–African–Middle Eastern Campaign Medal with 1 Campaign star	World War II Victory Medal
Unit awards	Presidential Unit Citation		

== Namings ==
- The US Army Barracks in Neu-Ulm, Germany was named after Sgt. Nelson.
- A liberty ship was named after him (?)
- The Middletown, Delaware National Guard armory
- A housing project at Fort Dix, New Jersey
- A recreational center at Fort Lewis, Washington
- VFW Post #3792, Middletown, Delaware

== See also ==
- List of Medal of Honor recipients for World War II
