= John E. Sweeney =

American politician (born 1955)

John Sweeney
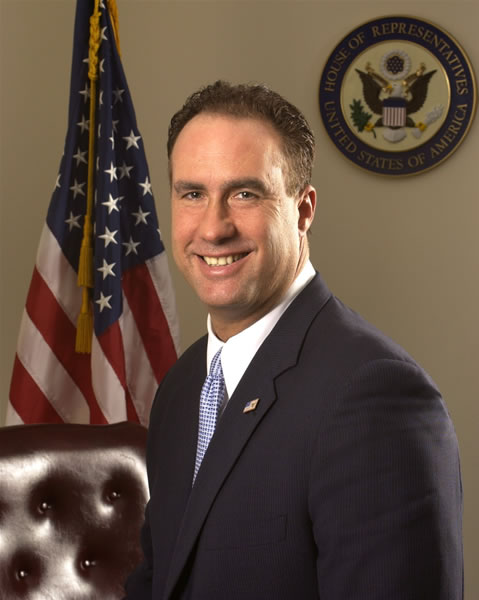
- Official portrait, 2006

Member of the U.S. House of Representatives from New York
- In office January 3, 1999 – January 3, 2007
- Preceded by: Gerald Solomon
- Succeeded by: Kirsten Gillibrand
- Constituency: 22nd district (1999–2003); 20th district (2003–2007)

Commissioner of the New York State Department of Labor
- In office January 17, 1995 – June 11, 1997
- Governor: George Pataki
- Preceded by: John Hudacs
- Succeeded by: James Dillon

Personal details
- Born: John Edward Sweeney; August 9, 1955 (age 71) Troy, New York, U.S.
- Party: Republican
- Spouse(s): Betty Sweeney; Gaia Sweeney; Erin Sweeney
- Education: Hudson Valley Community College; Sage College (BA); Western New England University (JD)

John Edward Sweeney (born August 9, 1955) is an American politician from the U.S. state of New York. He was a member of the U.S. House of Representatives, representing New York's 20th congressional district from 1999 to 2007.

A Republican, he previously served as the Commission of the New York State Department of Labor under George Pataki from 1995 to 1997. He was dubbed "Congressman Kick-Ass" by President George W. Bush for his take-no-prisoners style. He was defeated for reelection in 2006 by Democrat Kirsten Gillibrand.

== Early life and education ==
Sweeney was born in Troy, New York and graduated from Lansingburgh High School in 1973. He is of Irish and Armenian descent. He received an associate degree from Hudson Valley Community College in 1978 and a bachelor's degree in Political Science and Criminal Justice from the Sage College of Albany in 1981. In 1991, he received a J.D. from Western New England College School of Law.

In 2000, Toby Eglund wrote:

"Sweeney ... embodies that embarrassment of the Left: the rightward drift of America's white working class males. The son of a shirt factory worker active in the Amalgamated Shirt Cutters Union, and a sometime resident of a housing project, Sweeney grew up in the old, gritty industrial city of Troy, New York. He put himself through law school, and toiled as a minor county bureaucrat until, one day, he was discovered by Republican State Chairman William Powers who made him executive director of the New York state GOP in 1992."

== Political career ==
=== Early career and New York Republican Party executive director ===
Sweeney was "Rensselaer County's one-time STOP-DWI coordinator."

He was the Executive Director & Chief Counsel of the New York Republican Party from 1992 to 1995, a period of tremendous success for the state GOP. During Sweeney's tenure at state Republican headquarters, Rudy Giuliani was elected mayor of New York City (the first Republican to win the mayor's office in 28 years) and George Pataki was elected governor (the first Republican to win the Governor's Mansion in 20 years) and Republicans made gains in both houses of the state legislature and at the local level. Sweeney was Governor Pataki's first Commissioner of the State Department of Labor, from 1995 to 1997, then he moved to Governor Pataki's inner-circle staff as Deputy Secretary to the Governor, from 1997 until he resigned to run for Congress.

=== State Commissioner of Labor under Pataki administration ===
As Governor George Pataki's Commissioner of Labor, Sweeney was the point-man on successful efforts to reform the Empire State's Workers' Compensation laws. Before the reforms, enacted in 1996, New York's workers' comp system had long been considered one of the most costly in the nation—57 percent higher than the national average, 53 percent higher than neighboring Massachusetts, 59 percent than neighboring Connecticut and 85 percent higher than neighboring New Jersey.

New York's "landmark" workers' comp reforms created the Office of Workers' Compensation Fraud, an Inspector General, and a workers' compensation fraud unit at the State Insurance Department and elevated workers' comp fraud from a misdemeanor to a felony punishable by fines, restitution and incarceration.

=== Congressional career ===
==== Election to U.S. House of Representatives in 1998 ====
Prior to the 1998 election, Sweeney moved from Cohoes to Speigletown, to run for the seat in the district of Republican Representative Gerald Solomon who was retiring. Sweeney was born, raised and lived most of his life in Solomon's Congressional District. Solomon endorsed and campaigned for Sweeney, as did every Republican elected official and organization in the district.

Sweeney was elected to the US House in 1998, winning with 55 percent of the vote over Democratic challenger Jean Bordewich, despite the fact that President Bill Clinton carried the district over U.S. Senator Bob Dole in 1996 by a 46 percent to 41 percent margin.

==== Re-elections ====
In 2000, Sweeney defeated Democrat Kenneth McCallion, receiving 68 percent of the vote.

In 2002, he defeated Frank Stoppenbach, getting 73 percent of the vote.

In 2004, he defeated Doris F. Kelly, receiving 66 percent of the vote.

==== Tenure and political positions ====
Sweeney generally, but not invariably, supported the positions of his fellow Republicans in the House. Sweeney opposed same-sex marriage (asserting that "a handful of activist judges have decided to undermine the will of the people"), and in 2004 called for a federal constitutional amendment to ban recognition of same-sex marriage. Sweeney subsequently voted against such a constitutional amendment. Sweeney enjoyed a measure of support from organized labor. He received the endorsement of the Civil Service Employees Union and enjoyed good relations with the Teamsters. He opposed NAFTA, and in 2006 was one of 28 House Republicans to vote against the Oman–United States Free Trade Agreement, although he voted for CAFTA. He supported the George W. Bush administration's position on the Iraq War, which was a focus of criticism from his opponent, Kirsten Gillibrand, in the 2006 race.

Sweeney opposed gun control.

He voted for prayer in public schools on numerous occasions and the National Education Association gives him an 18% approval rating.

After the September 11, 2001 terrorist attack, Sweeney and U.S. Representative James T. Walsh were two Republicans who cross party-lines to vote with Democrats on an effort in the House of Representatives to send $20 billion in emergency federal aid to New York City (the measure failed in the Appropriations Committee by a 33–31 vote). Although an ally of President George W. Bush, he called for the resignation of Bush's Homeland Security Secretary Michael Chertoff over proposed cuts in New York's share in homeland security funding.

In 1999 and 2001, Sweeney introduced legislation (the "Anti-Drug Legalization Act") that would ban all federal funding for research pertaining to drug legalization; the legislation did not advance. He voted against the Rohrabacher–Farr amendment.

Before being elected to Congress, Sweeney was considered a moderate Republican who favored abortion rights; by 2000, he was considered a strong abortion opponent, with a 90% anti-abortion record. He voted in favor of legislation that would make it a federal crime to transport minors across state lines for an abortion and thus circumvent state "parental consent" laws.

=== 2006 re-election campaign loss ===
In August 2006, Sweeney's allies filed successfully against signatures on Libertarian opponent Eric Sundwall's ballot petitions, resulting in Sundwall's name being removed from the general election ballot. However, Sweeney still lost the general election on November 7, 2006, to Democrat Kirsten Gillibrand with 47% of the vote.

=== Political activity after leaving Congress ===
Following his congressional tenure, Sweeney returned to the political process both locally and nationally as an election and compliance lawyer and strategist.

In 2012, Sweeney worked for Newt Gingrich's unsuccessful campaign for the Republican presidential nomination.

In April 2016, Sweeney was hired by Donald Trump's campaign to help organize New York during the primary and do compliance work.

After Trump's election day victory, Sweeney, as the campaign's deputy counsel, led the effort on the ground in Wisconsin and Michigan to protect the campaign's advantage in those two key swing states during the recounts initiated by Jill Stein, the Green Party candidate, and supported by Hillary Clinton's campaign.

In December 2016, Sweeney joined the executive committee of Trump's transition team. Sweeney was later promoted to a four-member "Tiger Team" for Trump, tasked with conducting interviews with potential nominees for ambassadorships and other high-level positions in various federal departments and agencies.

== Controversies ==
=== Role in Florida recount in 2000 ===
During the 2000 election, Sweeney allegedly helped earn his nickname from President Bush, "Congressman Kick-Ass," by organizing the so-called Brooks Brothers riot that disrupted the Florida elections commissioners. He was said to have led the charge on the third recount in Miami, flying in GOP operatives and instructing them to "shut it down!" by raising a clamor and pounding on the election commission's doors. Sweeney used the words "thugs" to describe the Florida officials involved in the recount. He defended his actions in connection with the incident as "completely and absolutely legitimate" and declared that his intent was only to stop the canvassing board from withdrawing its activities from public view.

Former Republican National Committee Chairman Ed Gillespie, in his book Winning Right, wrote that the night before the recount began in Miami-Dade County, Sweeney was one of about a dozen Bush campaign operatives who gathered at Joe's Stone Crab in South Beach, that set out the campaign's media strategy. Gillespie recalled that "[Sweeney] said, 'I know what I'm going to say tomorrow morning. I'm going to say that Joseph Stalin said, "It doesn't matter who casts the votes, it only matters who counts the votes." And these people are worse than Stalin.' He ended up holding the Stalin quotation until the 5:30 pm wrap-up."

=== Congressional ethics controversies ===
In September 2006, the Citizens for Responsibility and Ethics in Washington (CREW) included Sweeney on its annual list of "The 20 Most Corrupt Members of Congress," citing ethical concerns arising from a "ski trip to New York, the exchange of legislative assistance for campaign contributions and the hiring of his wife as a campaign fundraiser."

==== Wife as fundraiser ====
On April 11, 2003, Sweeney began paying a company called Creative Consulting for fund-raising. The company had been founded a day earlier by Gaia "Gayle" Ford. Between April 2003 and December 2003, Sweeney's campaign paid $42,570 to the firm. Sweeney proposed to Ford in September 2003 and married her in 2004.

Sweeney spokeswoman Melissa Carlson said the congressman considers his wife "his best representative in the district when he's fund-raising." She said Ford, who had no previous fund-raising experience, receives a 10 percent commission on whatever she raises. Between January 2005 and April 2006, Ford was paid $30,879. Sweeney also has had a fundraising consultant on monthly retainer since June 2004, who is paid $8,583 a month.

Ford also works for Powers & Company, the lobbying firm of former state GOP Chairman William Powers, Sweeney's longtime political ally and onetime boss.

==== Publicly funded ski trips ====
The Winter Challenge was started in 1998 by Sweeney's House predecessor, Gerald Solomon, with the declared purpose of showcasing the Olympic facilities at Lake Placid, New York to congressmen and their staffers in hopes of getting federal funds; Sweeney has hosted the annual event since 1999.

In January 2006, Sweeney, his wife, and about 60 other people spent a four-day weekend at the facilities, competing against each other in skating, downhill skiing and bobsledding events. The group included Representative Pete Sessions (R-TX), a close friend of Sweeney and his wife; and aides to U.S. Senator Hillary Clinton (D-NY), Senator Harry Reid (D-NV), Representative Randy Kuhl (R-NY), and Representative Bart Stupak (D-MI). The weekend cost the Olympic Regional Development Authority (ORDA) $27,500, plus in-kind services it provided and the costs of operating the Olympic venues for the competition (exact figures for the latter two were unavailable). ORDA is a part of the New York State government.

In the fall of 2005, the House ethics panel told Sweeney in a letter that he should be careful to let the Olympics groups invite guests to avoid the appearance of an endorsement by the House. "Once the ORDA and the U.S. Olympic Committee — without your involvement — have issued an initial invitation to House members and staff to take part in the trip, you may send a follow-up to that invitation", the ethics panel, known formally as the Committee on Standards of Official Conduct, wrote to Sweeney.

Invitations to the event officially come from ORDA and the U.S. Olympic Committee, a nonprofit group chartered by Congress. ORDA says the impetus for the event comes from the U.S. Olympic Committee. The U.S. Olympic Committee said it's really Sweeney's event. Three committees of the NY State Assembly have launched investigations of the Challenge, focusing on whether public money was put to good use. ORDA President Ted Blazer, speaking at one such hearing, said Sweeney's office helped assemble lists of possible invitees to the event.

Documents show that at least eight members of Congress, all Republicans, were also invited to attend the 2006 event but declined.

The official invitation for the event read: "While this trip has proven itself to be an enjoyable one for delegation members in the past, it is, nevertheless, an official trip authorized by the House and Senate Ethics Committees . . . intended to provide an opportunity for Members of Congress and Congressional staff to inspect and evaluate the manner in which federal funds have been used to strengthen the area's tourism industry."

Despite the House ethics rule requiring all travel paid by others to relate to members' official duties, and the ethics panel's letter that said that recreational activities must be "merely incidental to the trip", Sweeney has said that the panel said "it's perfectly appropriate for me to promote the event."

The group attending the event included at least 15 registered lobbyists, including Pete Card, a former staffer of Sweeney's and the brother of former White House Chief of Staff Andrew Card, and Lisi Kaufman, a lobbyist for United Technologies Corporation, the sister of Andrew and Pete. In his request to the House ethics committee, Sweeney did not ask about lobbyists. A spokesman for ORDA said he does not know why the lobbyists were invited.

Seven of the lobbyists had contributed a total of $12,400 to Sweeney's campaign in 2005.

==== Ties to Allen Stanford ====
Sweeney was part of a group of lawmakers known as the Caribbean Caucus, sponsored by disgraced financier Allen Stanford. The group, formed to promote relations with Caribbean nations, took 11 trips to places like St. Croix, Montego Bay and Key Biscayne. The meetings, which included receptions with lobster, caviar and wine, cost $311,307 and were paid for by the Inter-American Economic Council, a non-profit funded by Stanford. Other members of the Caucus included convicted influence peddler Rep. Bob Ney and close Sweeney friend Rep. Pete Sessions. In 2004, Stanford hosted a wedding reception for Sweeney and wife at the Pavilion Restaurant, owned by Stanford. At the time, Sweeney told the Antigua Sun "If it wasn't for Allen, I certainly would not be here today."

=== Disputed domestic violence report ===
On October 31, 2006, the Albany Times Union reported on a 9-1-1 call made by Sweeney's wife in December 2005, in which she complained that her husband had been "'knocking her around' during a late-night argument at the couple's home." The responding officers filed a domestic incident report, which states that Sweeney allegedly grabbed his wife "by the neck" and pushed her around the house.

John and Gaia Sweeney subsequently said they would give the New York State Police permission to release a report about the incident. They said that the report was inaccurate but have not disputed its contents. On November 17, 2006, the Times Union reported that there were two versions of the domestic violence report that had been prepared by the State Police, one that was sent to them, doctored and lacking details, and the original report.

On July 22, 2007, the Albany Times Union reported that Gaia Sweeney, who was contesting a divorce action by her husband, said that he was often verbally abusive and at times physically abused her during their marriage. She also said that a statement she made on the eve of last fall's election, denying marital abuse, was "coerced". Sweeney denied that he had been abusive; he had recently obtained a judicial order of protection against his wife.

Sweeney's first wife, Betty Sweeney, of Schaghticoke, told the Times-Union that she had "never observed any kind of behavior like that towards me or anybody else."

The State Police moved to demote a State Police captain weeks after the November 2006 election, alleging that he had leaked the police report on Sweeney. The captain denied leaking the report, saying he was wrongly accused, and the captain was supported by the New York State Police Benevolent Association (PBA), who called the captain a scapegoat. The officer was ultimately not demoted, but was transferred to a different role that resulted in lower pay.

=== Alcohol issues ===
==== Attendance at college fraternity party ====
In April 2006, news outlets reported that Sweeney had attended a party at Union College's Alpha Delta Phi house in Schenectady; photographs surfaced of the congressman at the party, and the student newspaper Concordiensis cited witnesses stating that he was visibly intoxicated. Democrats ridiculed Sweeney over the embarrassing photos; Sweeney said through a spokeswoman that he had briefly spoken to students and posed for photos before departing, and that he was not drinking during the event.

==== DWI convictions in 2007 and 2009 ====
Sweeney was charged with aggravated DWI when he was arrested by New York State Police at 1:19 a.m. on November 11, 2007, on the Adirondack Northway, a stretch of Interstate 87. Sweeney's car had reportedly been swerving and a 24-year-old woman was seated partially on his lap when spotted by a state trooper. Sweeney's blood alcohol content registered at .18 percent, more than double the legal limit. Sweeney issued an apology, and on November 14, 2007, Sweeney pleaded guilty to drunk driving after his attorney vocally and publicly denied he had even been drinking that evening. Sweeney paid a US$1,000 fine, but avoided jail time. His license was suspended for six months and had to attend a victim impact panel for drunken drivers.

Early on the morning of April 5, 2009, Sweeney was pulled over by state police for speeding. He refused a breathalyzer test ordered by the officer, and according to a newspaper report, "Sweeney allegedly told the officers he would not pass the sobriety test, adding he was in 'big trouble.'" Sweeney was charged with felony DWI (since he had a prior DWI conviction within the past 10 years). in a February 2010 plea deal, Sweeney admitted to driving drunk and pleaded guilty to lesser charges, specifically a misdemeanor count. The agreement allowed Sweeney to avoid a felony conviction and thus avoid disbarment. He was sentenced to 30 days in county jail, and was released in April 2010 after serving 17 days. In addition to jail, Sweeney was also sentenced to three years of probation, 300 hours of community service, and was ordered to pay $2,000 in fines and surcharges. His driver's license was revoked, and Sweeney also had to wear an ankle bracelet to detect alcohol consumption.

==== Recovery from alcoholism ====
In 2011, Sweeney told a reporter that he had been sober since April 6, 2009. He stated that others had spoken to him about his drinking since the late 1990s and that he had been a "highly functional alcoholic" during his career in elected office. He described making amends with his family, describing his biggest loss from drinking as not the loss of his seat in Congress, but "the loss of myself and the loss of everything that went with it, the harm and hurt I created for people around me who I love and love me."

2019 Troy Mayoral Election

In November 2019, leaked audio from a verbally abusive private meeting between McLaughlin, several of his top political and governmental aides, Sweeney, and then-Republican candidate for Troy mayor Thomas Reale, was published by the Times Union. During the meeting, McLaughlin, County Director of Operations Richard Christ, County Director of Purchasing James Gordon, and Sweeney pressured Reale to drop out of the mayoral race and endorse Rodney Wiltshire, a third-party candidate defeated in the Democratic primary by incumbent Democratic Mayor Patrick Madden. Mr. Reale remained in the race and was defeated by Madden in the general election.

== Personal life ==
Sweeney has three adult children from his first marriage. He lives in Clifton Park, New York. He has two young children with his wife, Erin, and two step-children from her prior marriage.

Sweeney's father was the leader of a shirt-cutter's union in Troy, NY.

== Election results ==
1998 United States House of Representatives elections in New York: District 22
Party	Candidate	Votes	%	±%
Republican	John E. Sweeney	106,919	55.3	−5.2
Democratic	Jean P. Bordewich	81,296	42.1	+2.6
Right to Life	Francis A. Giroux	5,051	2.6	+2.6
Margin of victory		25,623	13.3	−7.7
Turnout		193,266	?	−18.9
Republican hold		Swing	?	

2000 United States House of Representatives elections in New York: District 22
Party	Candidate	Votes	%	±%
Republican	John E. Sweeney (Incumbent)	167,368	67.9	+12.6
Democratic	Kenneth F. McCallion	79,111	32.1	−10.0
Margin of victory		88,257	35.8	+22.5
Turnout		246,479	?	+27.5
Republican hold		Swing	?	

2002 United States House of Representatives elections in New York's 20th district
Party	Candidate	Votes	%	±%
Republican	John E. Sweeney	140,238	73.3%	+15.7%
Democratic	Frank Stoppenbach	45,878	24.0%	−16.1%
Green	Margaret Lewis	5,162	2.7%	+2.7%
Majority		94,360	49.3%	+31.8%
Turnout		191,278	100%	−19.0%

2004 United States House of Representatives elections in New York's 20th district
Party	Candidate	Votes	%	±%
Republican	John E. Sweeney (incumbent)	188,753	65.8%	−7.5%
Democratic	Doris F. Kelly	96,630	33.7%	+9.7%
Centrist Party	Morris N. Guller	1,353	0.5%	+0.5%
Majority		92,123	32.1%	−17.2%
Turnout		286,736	100%	+49.9%

2006 United States House of Representatives elections in New York's 20th district
Party	Candidate	Votes	%	±%
Democratic	Kirsten Gillibrand	125,168	53.1%	+19.4%
Republican	John E. Sweeney (incumbent)	110,554	46.9%	−18.9%
Majority		14,614	6.2%	−25.9%
Turnout		235,722	100%	−17.8%

== Notes ==
U.S. House of Representatives
Preceded by Gerald Solomon	Member of the U.S. House of Representatives from New York's 22nd congressional district 1999–2003	Succeeded by Maurice D. Hinchey
Preceded by Benjamin A. Gilman	Member of the U.S. House of Representatives from New York's 20th congressional district 2003–2007	Succeeded by Kirsten Gillibrand
U.S. order of precedence (ceremonial)
Preceded by Rick Lazio as Former U.S. Representative	Order of precedence of the United States as Former U.S. Representative	Succeeded by John Katko as Former U.S. Representative
