= Thomas Baker (Medal of Honor) =

US Army Medal of Honor recipient (1916–1944)

Thomas A. Baker
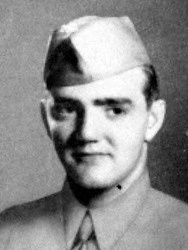
- Born: June 25, 1916; Troy, New York, US
- Died: July 7, 1944 (aged 28); Saipan, Marianas Islands
- Burial place: Saratoga National Cemetery, Schuylerville, New York
- Military career
- Allegiance: United States of America
- Branch: United States Army
- Service years: 1940–1944
- Rank: Sergeant (posthumous)
- Units: A Company, 1st Battalion, 105th Infantry Regiment, 27th Infantry division
- Conflicts: World War II: Pacific War; Mariana and Palau Islands campaign; Battle of Saipan †
- Awards: Medal of Honor

Thomas Alexander Baker (June 25, 1916 – July 7, 1944) was a United States Army soldier who posthumously received the U.S. military's highest decoration, the Medal of Honor, for his actions in World War II during the Battle of Saipan.

Baker was born in 1916 in Troy, New York, and joined the U.S. Army after graduating from high school. After Army basic training he was sent to fight in World War II. While serving as a member of the 27th Infantry Division he was injured and refused to be evacuated. He was later found dead with an empty pistol and the bodies of eight Japanese soldiers around him.

== Biography ==
Baker was born on June 25, 1916, in Troy, New York, and joined the Army from that city in October 1940. By June 19, 1944, he was serving as a private in Company A of the 105th Infantry Regiment, 27th Infantry Division. On that day, on Saipan in the Marianas Islands, he advanced ahead of his unit with a bazooka and destroyed a Japanese emplacement which was firing on his company. Several days later, he single-handedly attacked and killed two groups of Japanese soldiers. On July 7, Baker's position came under attack by a large Japanese force. Although seriously wounded early in the attack, he refused to be evacuated and continued to fight in the close-range battle until running out of ammunition. When a comrade was wounded while trying to carry him to safety, Baker insisted that he be left behind. At his request, his comrades left him propped against a tree and gave him an M1911 pistol, which had eight bullets remaining. When American forces retook the position, they found the pistol, then empty, and eight dead Japanese soldiers around Baker's body.

Baker was posthumously promoted to sergeant and, on May 9, 1945, awarded the Medal of Honor for his actions throughout the battle for Saipan. He was buried at Gerald B. H. Solomon Saratoga National Cemetery in Schuylerville, New York.

== Medal of Honor citation ==
For conspicuous gallantry and intrepidity at the risk of his life above and beyond the call of duty at Saipan, The Mariana Islands, 19 June to 7 July 1944. When his entire company was held up by fire from automatic weapons and small-arms fire from strongly fortified enemy positions that commanded the view of the company, Sgt. (then Pvt.) Baker voluntarily took a bazooka and dashed alone to within 100 yards of the enemy. Through heavy rifle and machine gun fire that was directed at him by the enemy, he knocked out the strong point, enabling his company to assault the ridge. Some days later while his company advanced across the open field flanked with obstructions and places of concealment for the enemy, Sgt. Baker again voluntarily took up a position in the rear to protect the company against a surprise attack and came upon two heavily fortified enemy pockets manned by two officers and ten enlisted men which had been bypassed. Without regard for such superior numbers, he unhesitatingly attacked and killed all of them. Five hundred yards farther, he discovered six men of the enemy who had concealed themselves behind our lines and destroyed all of them. On 7 July 1944, the perimeter of which Sgt. Baker was a part was attacked from 3 sides by from 3,000 to 5,000 Japanese. During the early stages of this attack, Sgt. Baker was severely wounded, but he insisted on remaining in the line and fired at the enemy at ranges sometimes as close as 5 yards until his ammunition ran out. Without ammunition and with his weapon battered to uselessness from hand-to-hand combat, he was carried about 50 yards to the rear by a comrade, who was then himself wounded. At this point Sgt. Baker refused to be moved any further stating that he preferred to be left to die rather than risk the lives of any more of his friends. A short time later, at his request, he was placed in a sitting position against a small tree. Another comrade, withdrawing, offered assistance. Sgt. Baker refused, insisting that he be left alone and be given a soldier's pistol with its remaining eight rounds of ammunition. When last seen alive, Sgt. Baker was propped against a tree, pistol in hand, calmly facing the foe. Later Sgt. Baker's body was found in the same position, gun empty, with 8 Japanese lying dead before him. His deeds were in keeping with the highest traditions of the U.S. Army.

== Honors ==
In November 2009, a memorial honoring Baker and fellow Troy natives Major General Ogden J. Ross and Lieutenant Colonel William J. O'Brien was installed in the Rensselaer County office building. O'Brien, like Baker a member of the 105th Infantry, was also posthumously awarded the Medal of Honor for his actions on Saipan; he died there within hours of Baker. Ross was a former commander of the 105th Infantry and an assistant divisional commander during the Battle of Saipan. The memorial includes replicas of the Medals of Honor awarded to Baker and O'Brien.

== See also ==
- List of Medal of Honor recipients for World War II
