= USNS Colonel William J. O'Brien =

Cargo ship of the United States Navy

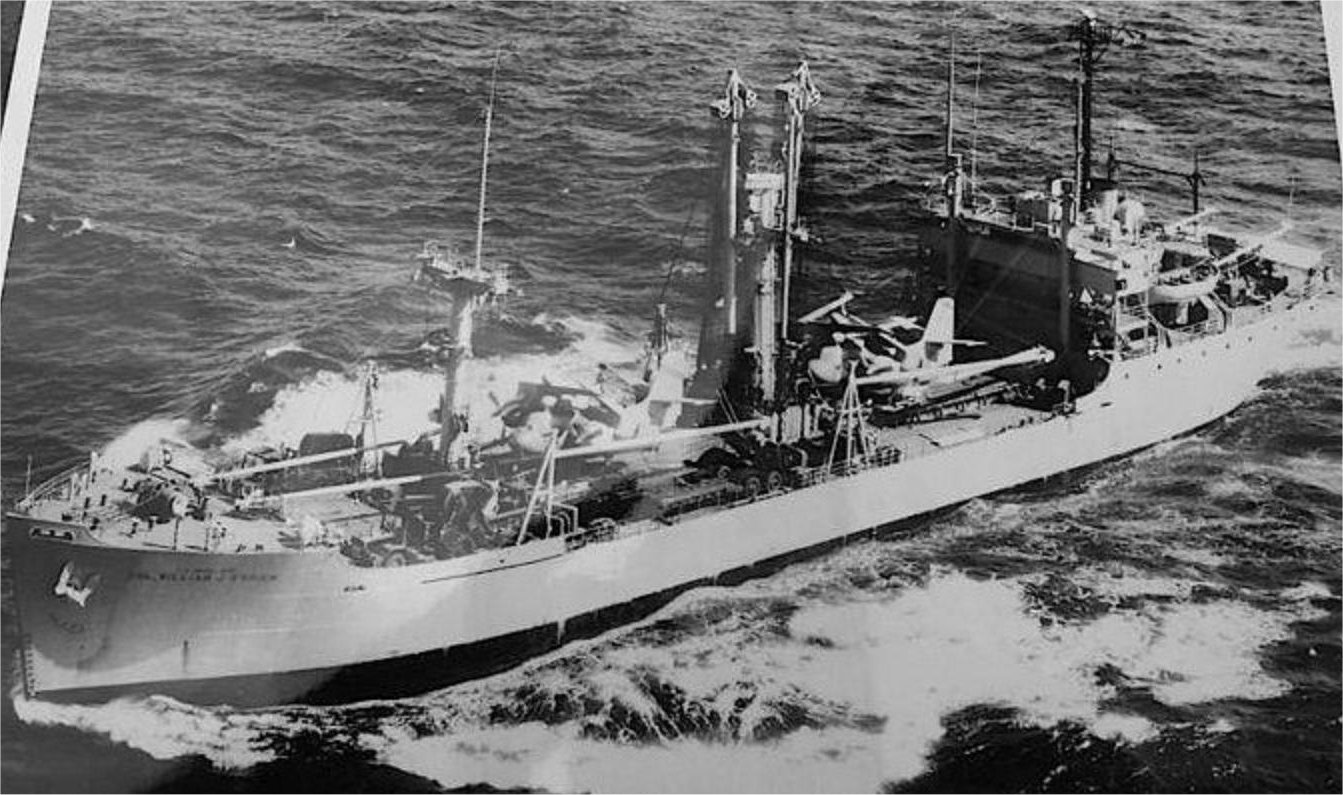
- USNS Colonel William J. O'Brien (T-AK-246), underway, date and location unknown.

History

United States
- Name: Maiden's Eye (never received name)
- Namesake: Maiden's Eye (a type of knot)
- Ordered: as type (C1-M-AV1) hull, MC hull 2323
- Builder: Consolidated Steel Corporation, Long Beach, California
- Yard number: 1228
- Laid down: 17 January 1945
- Launched: 13 February 1945
- Commissioned: delivered to War Shipping Administration (WSA) prior to commissioning, 10 April 1945
- Identification: Hull symbol: AK-246 (never received number); Code letters: NSSU
- Fate: Delivered to the Army Transportation Service (ATS), 11 July 1946

History

United States
- Name: Colonel William J. O’Brien
- Namesake: Lieutenant Colonel William J. O’Brien, awarded Medal of Honor
- Operator: ATS
- Acquired: 11 July 1945
- In service: 11 July 1945
- Out of service: 1 March 1950
- Fate: Transferred to the US Navy, 1 March 1950

History

United States
- Name: Colonel William J. O’Brien
- Operator: MSTS
- Acquired: 1 March 1950
- In service: 1 March 1950
- Out of service: 1 September 1973
- Stricken: 1 September 1973
- Identification: Hull symbol: T-AK-246
- Fate: Sold for scrapping, 9 November 1973

General characteristics
- Class & type: Alamosa-class cargo ship
- Type: C1-M-AV1
- Tonnage: 5,032 long tons deadweight (DWT)
- Displacement: 2,382 long tons (2,420 t) (standard); 7,450 long tons (7,570 t) (full load)
- Length: 388 ft 8 in (118.47 m)
- Beam: 50 ft (15 m)
- Draft: 21 ft 1 in (6.43 m)
- Installed power: 1 × Nordberg, TSM 6 diesel engine; 1,750 shp (1,300 kW)
- Propulsion: 1 × propeller
- Speed: 11.5 kn (21.3 km/h; 13.2 mph)
- Capacity: 3,945 t (3,883 long tons) DWT; 9,830 cu ft (278 m^{3}) (refrigerated); 227,730 cu ft (6,449 m^{3}) (non-refrigerated)
- Complement: 15 Officers; 70 Enlisted

USNS Colonel William J. O’Brien (T-AK-246) was a US Maritime Administration (MARCOM) C1-M-AV1 type coastal cargo ship, originally planned as an Alamosa-class cargo ship. Constructed as Maiden's Eye for the MARCOM, completed in August 1945 and placed in operation by the War Shipping Administration (WSA). After the war Maiden's Eye was transferred to the US Army and renamed USAT Colonel William J. O’Brien who kept her in service until transferred to the US Navy in 1950 for operation as USNS Colonel William J. O’Brien (T-AK-246) by the Military Sea Transportation Service (MSTS) until 1973.

== Construction ==
The ship was laid down as Maiden's Eye, one of the "Knot" ships named for a type of splice, on 17 January 1945 and launched, sponsored by Mrs. Thomas S. Middleton, on 13 February 1945 at Consolidated Steel Corporation, Long Beach, California, as a type (C1-M-AV1) under MARCOM contract, MC hull 2323. She was acquired by the US War Shipping Administration (WSA) on 10 April 1945 with operation by Grace Line as WSA's agent.

== US military service ==
On 11 July 1946, Maiden's Eye was assigned to the U.S. Army under bareboat charter for operation as USAT Colonel William J. O'Brien until transferred to the US Navy 1 March 1950. The Army name was retained with the ship immediately transferred to the MSTS as USNS Colonel William J. O’Brien (T-AK-246) for permanent assignment. USNS Colonel William J. O’Brien was stricken from the Navy List on 1 September 1973.

== Disposition ==
Title was returned to the Maritime Administration (MARAD) on 9 November 1973 with sale to B. V. Intershitra of the Netherlands for $223,550 for scrapping.

== Notes ==
Citations

== Bibliography ==
Online resources

- "Colonel William J. O'Brien (T-AK-246)". Dictionary of American Naval Fighting Ships. Naval History and Heritage Command. 30 June 2015. This article incorporates text from this source, which is in the public domain.
- "C1 Cargo Ships". www.ShipbuildingHistory.com. 28 August 2009.
- "USNS Colonel William J. O'brien (AK-246)". NavSource. 14 February 2014.
- "MAIDEN'S EYE". United States Department of Transportation. Archived from the original on November 2, 2014.
- "COLONEL WILLIAM J. O'BRIEN". United States Department of Transportation. Archived from the original on November 4, 2016.
- Long Beach Independent (14 February 1945). "326 Foot Vessel Launched Sideways". Long Beach Independent, Long Beach, California.
