= Battle of Sedjenane =

1943 military conflict in Sedjenane, Tunisia

- Part of Tunisia Campaign of World War II
| Date | February – March 1943; April – May 1943 |
| Location | Sedjenane, Tunisia 37°03′0″N 9°14′0″E |
| Result | Allied victory |

Belligerents
| United Kingdom | Germany; Italy |
- Location in Tunisia

Sedjenane is a town in northern Tunisia, on the railway line to Mateur and the port of Bizerta. The Battle of Sedjenane was fought during World War II between the Allies and Axis for control of a town in northern Tunisia, on the railway line to Mateur and the port of Bizerta. The battle was part of the Tunisia Campaign.

== First battle of Sedjenane, February–March 1943 ==
The town became of strategic importance during the Allied invasion of North Africa in World War II. Following the initial landings of Operation Torch, the Allied run for Tunis was halted by German paratroops (operating in the ground role) in the hills east of the town in November 1942. British troops of the 8th Battalion, Argyll and Sutherland Highlanders, part of 36th Brigade of British 78th Division, were ambushed as they advanced on the road through the hills on November 29, 1942, and their wrecked Universal Carriers in No man's land became a grim symbol of the ensuing stalemate to Allied troops over the following several months of the Tunisia Campaign. These dominant hills, known to the Allies, as "Green Hill", "Baldy" and "Sugarloaf" were a barrier to further Allied advances in the north through to February 1943. Alan Moorehead a war correspondent wrote in African Trilogy (1944),

Sejenane was a wayside railway town in the wet cork forests on the way to Mateur. Whoever held Mateur held Bizerta, and whoever held Green and Bald Hills outside Sedjenane held Mateur."

— Alan Moorehead

On February 26, 1943, the Germans broke the stalemate with Operation Ochsenkopf (Ox Head) offensive, a complementary blow to the Kasserine Pass offensive earlier that month. In a subsidiary operation Unternehmen Ausladung, the Axis attempted to outflank the British troops in Sedjenane and on the high ground opposite "Green Hill", with an attack on the hilly coastal strip to the north between the town and Cap Serrat, which was only lightly held by poorly-equipped French troops of the Corps Francs d'Afrique.

The German advance, led by Colonel Rudolf Witzig's Parachute Engineer Battalion, was held by a series of counter-attacks by the 16th Battalion, Durham Light Infantry, of 139th Brigade of British 46th Division, and two troops of No. 1 Commando on February 27, 1943, supported by the 70th Field and 5th Medium Regiments, Royal Artillery. 16 DLI mounted a further, disastrous counter-attack at dawn on March 2, 1943, in which it suffered severe casualties. That afternoon, the Germans also successfully advanced from the east towards Sedjenane and broke through the ranks of the 5th Battalion, Sherwood Foresters, also of 139th Brigade. According to Associated Press war correspondent Don Whitehead, an Italian infantry battalion (from the 10th Bersaglieri Regiment) supported by 30 tanks counterattacked in the British sector on 3 March, but lost half its strength killed to machine-gun fire.

The 6th Battalion, Lincolnshire Regiment, of 138th Brigade of 46th Division, several Churchill tanks of the North Irish Horse, of 25th Army Tank Brigade, plus elements of No. 1 Commando and 16 DLI were involved in the defence of the town, which finally fell to the Germans and Italians on March 4.

== Second battle of Sedjenane, April–May 1943 ==
The town was retaken by the Allies on April 1, 1943. The several Allied counter-attacks through March 1943, to first stem the German advance and then to retake Sedjenane, represented the first time that British and German parachute troops had fought each other. The use of the term 'Red Devil' to describe a British paratrooper reputedly has its origins in these engagements, fought by men of the 1st Parachute Brigade.

American forces took over the positions in the Sedjenane area and in front of 'Green Hill' on April 12, 1943, through to the conclusion of the North African Campaign in May 1943.

U.S. Army Sergeant William L Nelson, H Company, 2nd Battalion, 60th Infantry Regiment, U.S. 9th Infantry Division, was posthumously awarded the Medal of Honor for his actions at Djebel Dardys, northwest of Sedjenane, on April 24, 1943. The 2nd Battalion, 60th infantry Regiment also received a Presidential Unit Citation for its actions on April 23 and 24.
