= Gerald B. H. Solomon Saratoga National Cemetery =

Veterans cemetery in Saratoga County, New York

- Interactive map of Gerald B. H. Solomon Saratoga National Cemetery

Details
- Established: July 9, 1999
- Location: Schuylerville, New York
- Country: United States
- Coordinates: 43°01′45″N 73°36′30″W
- Type: Public
- Owned by: U.S. Department of Veterans Affairs
- Size: 351.7 acres (1 km^{2})
- No. of interments: >23,000
- Website: Official
- Find a Grave: Gerald B. H. Solomon Saratoga National Cemetery

Gerald B. H. Solomon Saratoga National Cemetery is a United States National Cemetery located in the village of Schuylerville in Saratoga County, New York. Administered by the United States Department of Veterans Affairs, it encompasses 351.7 acres (142.3 ha), and as of 2021 had over 23,000 interments.

== Location ==
The Gerald B.H. Solomon Saratoga National Cemetery is located on Duell Road in the town of Saratoga, New York. The closest village is Schuylerville, part of the town of Saratoga. The postal address is Stillwater, New York. The National Cemetery is within a mile of Saratoga National Historical Park's battlefield unit.

== History ==
Dedicated on July 9, 1999, as Saratoga National Cemetery, it was the 116th National Cemetery. It was renamed to Gerald B. H. Solomon Saratoga National Cemetery on January 24, 2002, in honor of Congressman Gerald B. H. Solomon, who was known for his support of veterans' causes, and who is interred there. During his tenure in the U.S. House of Representatives, he sponsored the legislation which created the Department of Veterans Affairs and secured approval for the creation of the national cemetery now named for him. He served in Congress from 1979 to 1999, and was Chairman of the powerful Rules Committee in the House at the time of his retirement. As of the end of 2005, only the first 60 acres (240,000 m^{2}) were developed for interments.

== Notable monuments ==
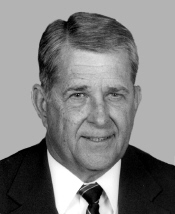
Gerald B. H. Solomon, U.S. Congressman from New York, 1979 to 1999.

- The ship’s bell from the USS Saratoga.
- A pyramidal memorial made of granite, erected in 2002 and dedicated to Congressman Gerald B.H. Solomon.

== Notable interments ==
- Medal of Honor recipients
  - Sergeant Thomas A. Baker, for action in World War II
  - Technical Sergeant Peter J. Dalessandro, for action in World War II
  - Specialist Four Raymond R. Wright, for action in the Vietnam War
- Others
  - Joseph E. Persico, author
  - Gerald B. H. Solomon, US Congressman
  - Jack Briggs, actor
