= John E. Butts =

United States Army Medal of Honor recipient (1922–1944)

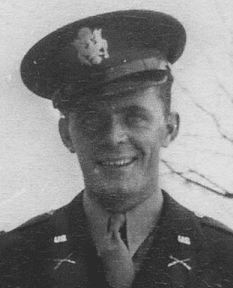
- 2nd Lieutenant John E. Butts, U.S. Army
- Born: August 4, 1922; Medina, New York
- Died: June 23, 1944 (aged 21); Normandy, France
- Burial place: St. Mary's Cemetery, Medina, New York
- Military career
- Allegiance: United States
- Branch: United States Army
- Service years: 1939–1944
- Rank: Second Lieutenant
- Units: E Company, 2nd Battalion, 60th Infantry, 9th Infantry Division
- Conflicts: World War II: North African Campaign; Invasion of Sicily; Battle of Normandy †
- Awards: Medal of Honor; Bronze Star; Purple Heart (3)

John Edward Butts (August 4, 1922 – June 23, 1944) was a United States Army second lieutenant and rifle platoon leader who received the Medal of Honor posthumously for his actions above and beyond the call of duty during the Normandy Campaign in World War II.

Butts was one of five brothers to serve in the war and the only one to be killed in action.

== Biography ==
Butts was born on August 4, 1920, in Medina, New York. He was one of six sons of Jerry and Anna (Hogan) Butts. He attended Medina High School where he played football.

He joined the National Guard in Medina at age 17, in 1939. He began National Guard training at Fort McClellan in Alabama in October 1940. After training, he was assigned to F Company, 2nd Battalion, 108th Infantry. In February 1942, he was sent to Hawaii. He returned to the United States in November to attend Officer Candidate School at Fort Benning, Georgia. He was commissioned a second lieutenant on November 29, at age 19.

He requested overseas duty and participated in the North Africa Campaign. Afterwards, he was part of the invasion of Sicily where he was decorated for bravery. During these campaigns and the Normandy Campaign in June 1944, he was a platoon leader of E Company, 2nd Battalion, 60th Infantry Regiment, 9th Infantry Division.

Butts was wounded on June 14 near Orglandes, France. He was wounded again on June 16 as his unit crossed the Douve River. On June 23, he was fatally wounded by machine gun fire while attacking a well defended enemy held hill. For his heroic actions and leadership under enemy fire on June 14, 16, and 23, he was posthumously awarded the Medal of Honor.

His body was buried in the United States Military Cemetery at Normandy. In 1948, his remains were removed and re-interred in St. Mary's Cemetery in Medina.

== Military Awards ==
Lt. Butts' medals and memorabilia are on display at the Lee-Whedon Memorial Library in Medina, NY.

His military decorations and awards include:

Combat Infantryman Badge
Medal of Honor	Bronze Star Medal	Purple Heart with two Bronze Oak Leaf Clusters
Army Good Conduct Medal	American Defense Service Medal	American Campaign Medal
European-African-Middle Eastern Campaign Medal with four 3/16" bronze stars	World War II Victory Medal	French Croix de Guerre with Palm (Citation only)
Presidential Unit Citation with one bronze oak leaf cluster

== Medal of Honor citation ==
Lt. Butts' Medal of Honor citation reads:

Rank and organization: Second Lieutenant, U.S. Army, Co. E, 60th Infantry, 9th Infantry Division.
Place and date: Normandy, France, 14, 16, and June 23, 1944.
Entered service at: Buffalo, N.Y. Birth: Medina, N.Y.
G.O. No.: 58, July 19, 1944.

The President of the United States takes pride in awarding the MEDAL OF HONOR posthumously to

SECOND LIEUTENANT JOHN E. BUTTS,
COMPANY E, 60TH INFANTRY
UNITED STATES ARMY

for service as set forth in the following
CITATION:

Lieutenant Butts heroically led his platoon against the enemy in Normandy, France, on 14, 16, and 23 June 1944. Despite being painfully wounded on the 14th near Orglandes and again on the 16th while spearheading an attack to establish a bridgehead across the Douve River, he refused medical aid and remained with his platoon. A week later, near Flottemanville Hague, he led an assault on a tactically important and stubbornly defended hill studded with tanks, anti-tank guns, pillboxes, and machinegun emplacements, and protected by concentrated artillery and mortar fire. As the attack was launched, Lieutenant Butts, at the head of his platoon, was critically wounded by German machinegun fire. Although weakened by his injuries, he rallied his men and directed one squad to make a flanking movement while he alone made a frontal assault to draw the hostile fire upon himself. Once more he was struck, but by grim determination and sheer courage continued to crawl ahead. When within ten yards of his objective, he was killed by direct fire. By his superb courage, unflinching valor and inspiring actions, Lieutenant Butts enabled his platoon to take a formidable strong point and contributed greatly to the success of his battalion's mission.

Harry Truman

== Legacy ==
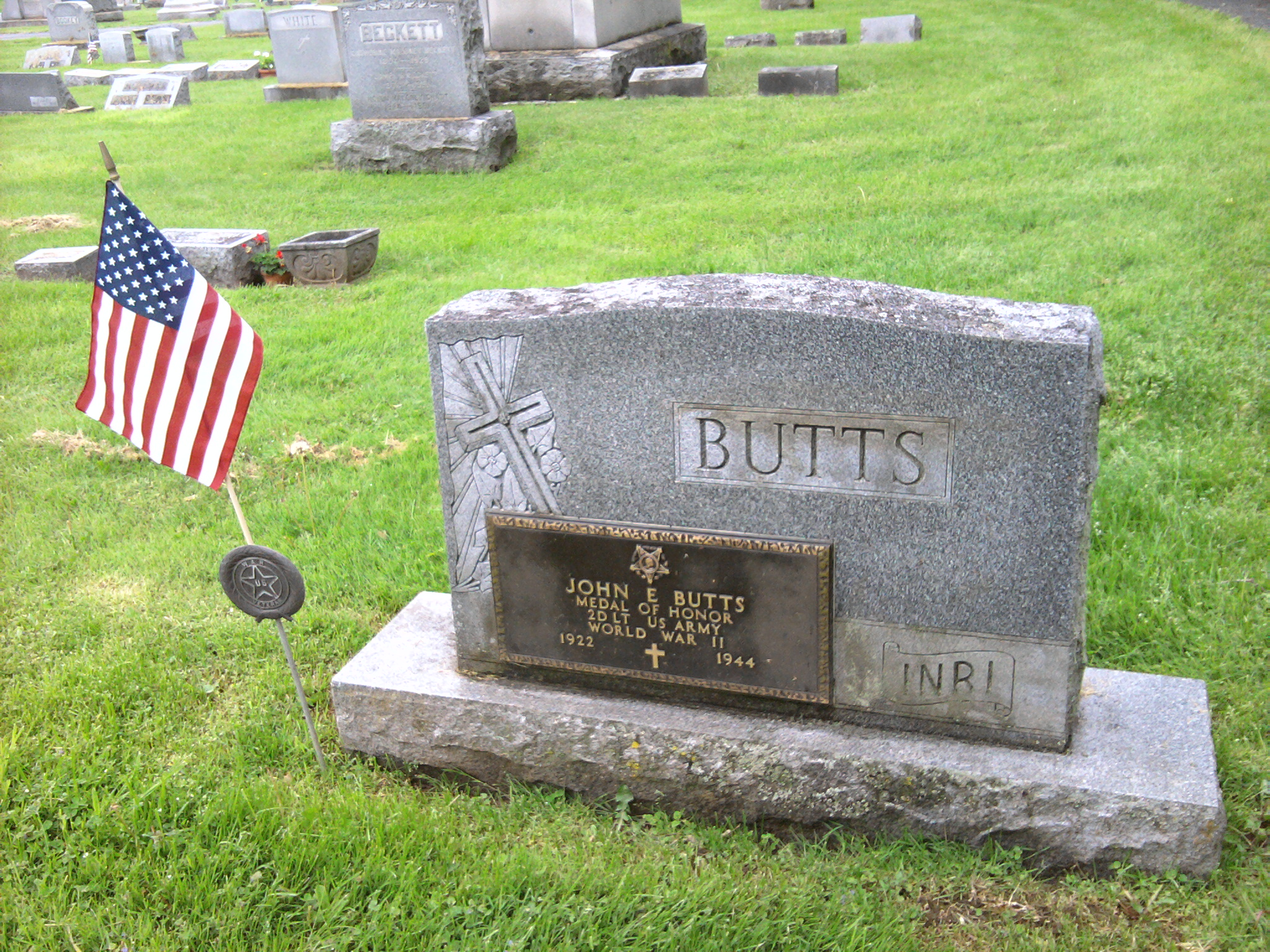
Gravestone of 2nd Lt. John E. Butts

Lt. Butts' received several military and public honors, including having two streets, an airfield, an American Legion Post, a park, an athletic field, and an ocean going ship named after him:

- Fort Carson, Colorado, Fort Benning, Georgia, and Fort Dix, NJ, all have roads named after Lt. Butts.
- In 1946, an athletic field in Augsburg, Germany, was dedicated in Lt. Butts' honor.
- In 1954, the James P. Clark American Legion Post #204 in Medina, New York, changed its name to the Butts-Clark American Legion Post #204.
- In 1957, the Army airfield at Fort Carson, Colorado, was named the Butts Army Airfield.
- In 1980, Medina dedicated a village park, the John E Butts Memorial Park.

== See also ==
- List of Medal of Honor recipients
- List of Medal of Honor recipients for World War II
