= Leonard B. Keller =

United States Army Medal of Honor recipient

Leonard Bert Keller
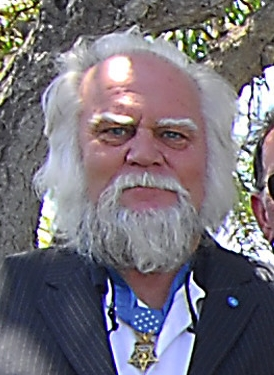
- Keller in July 2009
- Born: February 25, 1947; Rockford, Illinois
- Died: October 18, 2009 (aged 62); Pensacola, Florida
- Burial place: Arlington National Cemetery
- Military career
- Allegiance: United States of America
- Branch: United States Army
- Service years: 1966–1968
- Rank: Sergeant
- Nickname: "Len"
- Units: 60th Infantry Regiment, 9th Infantry Division
- Conflicts: Vietnam War
- Awards: Medal of Honor

Leonard Bert Keller (February 25, 1947 – October 18, 2009) was a United States Army soldier and a recipient of the United States military's highest decoration—the Medal of Honor—for his actions in the Vietnam War.

== Biography ==
A native of Rockford, Illinois, Keller was drafted into the U.S. Army from Chicago in the spring of 1966. He attended basic training at Fort Campbell, Kentucky, and advanced infantry training at Fort Polk, Louisiana. Sent to Vietnam that summer with the 60th Infantry Regiment, 9th Infantry Division, Keller and his unit performed reconnaissance missions in the Mekong Delta.

By May 2, 1967, Keller was serving as a sergeant in Company A, 3rd Battalion, 60th Infantry Regiment, 9th Infantry Division. On that day, in the Ap Bac Zone, Republic of Vietnam, Keller and fellow soldier Specialist Four Raymond R. Wright stormed a series of enemy bunkers which were firing on their unit. For their actions, both Keller and Wright were awarded the Medal of Honor. The medal was formally presented to him on September 19, 1968, by President Lyndon B. Johnson during a ceremony at the White House.

After being discharged from the military in August 1968, Keller married a United States Navy veteran and eventually moved to Milton, Florida. For more than 20 years, he was supervisor of the supply department at Naval Air Station Whiting Field, a primary flight training base northeast of Naval Air Station Pensacola.

== Death ==
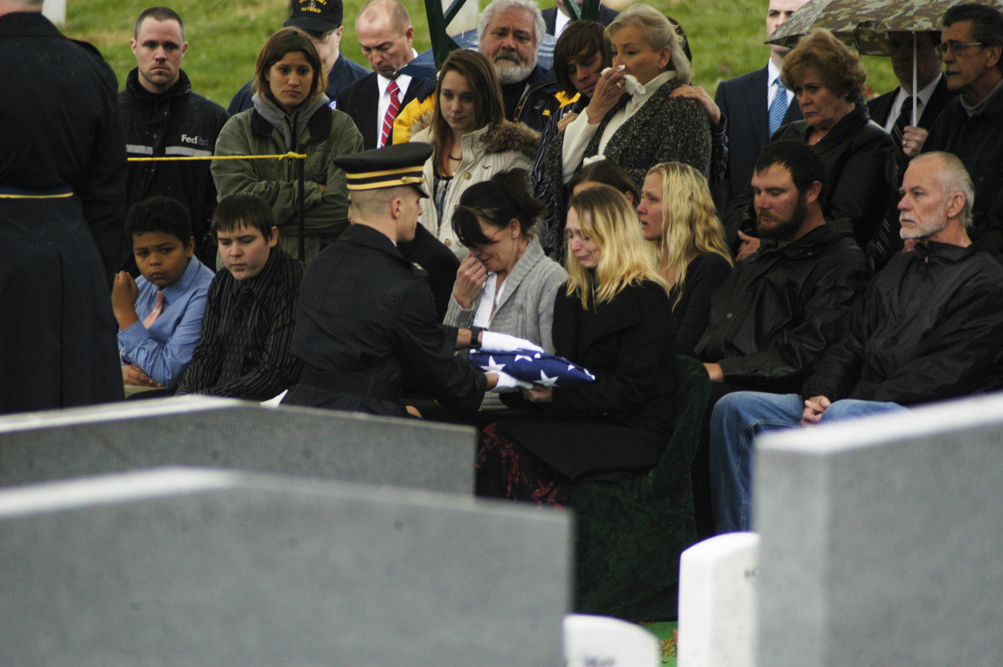
Keller's daughter accepts a folded flag during his burial ceremony at Arlington National Cemetery.

Keller died on October 18, 2009, at the age of 62 after a motorcycle accident in Milton. He was leaving a Fleet Reserve Association veterans' club when he lost control of his three-wheeled Harley-Davidson. The vehicle rolled several times and landed on top of him. He was taken to Sacred Heart Hospital in Pensacola, where he died. On November 30, 2009, Keller was buried at Arlington National Cemetery.

== Medal of Honor citation ==
Sergeant Keller's official Medal of Honor citation reads:

For conspicuous gallantry and intrepidity in action at the risk of his life above and beyond the call of duty. Sweeping through an area where an enemy ambush had occurred earlier, Sgt. Keller's unit suddenly came under intense automatic weapons and small-arms fire from a number of enemy bunkers and numerous snipers in nearby trees. Sgt. Keller quickly moved to a position where he could fire at a bunker from which automatic fire was received, killing 1 Viet Cong who attempted to escape. Leaping to the top of a dike, he and a comrade charged the enemy bunkers, dangerously exposing themselves to the enemy fire. Armed with a light machine gun, Sgt. Keller and his comrade began a systematic assault on the enemy bunkers. While Sgt. Keller neutralized the fire from the first bunker with his machine gun, the other soldier threw in a hand grenade killing its occupant. Then he and the other soldier charged a second bunker, killing its occupant. A third bunker contained an automatic rifleman who had pinned down much of the friendly platoon. Again, with utter disregard for the fire directed to them, the 2 men charged, killing the enemy within. Continuing their attack, Sgt. Keller and his comrade assaulted 4 more bunkers, killing the enemy within. During their furious assault, Sgt. Keller and his comrade had been almost continuously exposed to intense sniper fire as the enemy desperately sought to stop their attack. The ferocity of their assault had carried the soldiers beyond the line of bunkers into the treeline, forcing snipers to flee. The 2 men gave immediate chase, driving the enemy away from the friendly unit. When his ammunition was exhausted, Sgt. Keller returned to the platoon to assist in the evacuation of the wounded. The 2-man assault had driven an enemy platoon from a well-prepared position, accounted for numerous enemy dead, and prevented further friendly casualties. Sgt. Keller's selfless heroism and indomitable fighting spirit saved the lives of many of his comrades and inflicted serious damage on the enemy. His acts were in keeping with the highest traditions of the military service and reflect great credit upon himself and the U.S. Army.

== See also ==
- List of Medal of Honor recipients for the Vietnam War
