= Raymond R. Wright =

United States Army Medal of Honor recipient

Raymond Richard Wright
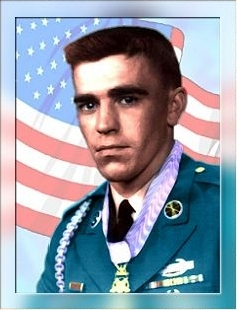
- Raymond Wright
- Born: December 15, 1945; Moriah, New York
- Died: September 24, 1999 (aged 53)
- Burial place: Gerald B. H. Solomon Saratoga National Cemetery
- Military career
- Allegiance: United States of America
- Branch: United States Army
- Rank: Specialist Four
- Nickname: Buzz
- Units: 60th Infantry Regiment, 9th Infantry Division
- Conflicts: Vietnam War
- Awards: Medal of Honor; Silver Star

Raymond Richard Wright (December 5, 1945 – September 24, 1999) was a United States Army soldier from New York and a recipient of the United States military's highest decoration—the Medal of Honor—for his actions in the Vietnam War.

== Biography ==
Wright joined the Army from his birth city of Moriah, New York, and by May 2, 1967, was serving as a Specialist Four in Company A of the 3d Battalion, 60th Infantry Regiment, 9th Infantry Division. On that day, in Ap Bac Zone, Republic of Vietnam, Wright and fellow soldier Sergeant Leonard B. Keller stormed a series of enemy bunkers which were firing on their unit. For their actions, both Wright and Keller were awarded the Medal of Honor.

Wright died at age 53 and was buried in Gerald B. H. Solomon Saratoga National Cemetery, Schuylerville, New York.

On November 4, 2000, a former World War I Veterans park, in the hamlet of Mineville, Town of Moriah, New York, was renamed in honor of Wright. Among the additions to the park was a monument in tribute to Wright and a monument honoring five servicemen from the Town of Moriah that died serving in Vietnam:

- John P. Drake, PFC US Army
- David L. Jarvis, HM3 US Navy
- Joseph J. Ribeiro, PFC US Army
- Marcus W. Stoddard, PFC USMC
- Michael D. Baker, SN US Navy.

== Medal of Honor citation ==
Specialist Four Wright's official Medal of Honor citation reads:

For conspicuous gallantry and intrepidity at the risk of his life above and beyond the call of duty. While serving as a rifleman with Company A, Sp4 Wright distinguished himself during a combat patrol in an area where an enemy ambush had occurred earlier. Sp4 Wright's unit suddenly came under intense automatic weapons and small-arms fire from an enemy bunker system protected by numerous snipers in nearby trees. Despite the heavy enemy fire, Sp4 Wright and another soldier leaped to the top of a dike to assault the position. Armed with a rifle and several grenades, he and his comrade exposed themselves to intense fire from the bunkers as they charged the nearest one. Sp4 Wright raced to the bunker, threw in a grenade, killing its occupant. The 2 soldiers then ran through a hail of fire to the second bunker. While his comrade covered him with his machinegun, Sp4 Wright charged the bunker and succeeded in killing its occupant with a grenade. A third bunker contained an automatic rifleman who had pinned down much of the friendly platoon. While his comrade again covered him with machinegun fire, Sp4 Wright charged in and killed the enemy rifleman with a grenade. The 2 soldiers worked their way through the remaining bunkers, knocking out 4 of them. Throughout their furious assault, Sp4 Wright and his comrade had been almost continuously exposed to intense sniper fire from the treeline as the enemy desperately sought to stop their attack. Overcoming stubborn resistance from the bunker system, the men advanced into the treeline forcing the snipers to retreat, giving immediate chase, and driving the enemy away from the friendly unit so that it advanced across the open area without further casualty. When his ammunition was exhausted, Sp4 Wright returned to his unit to assist in the evacuation of the wounded. This 2-man assault had driven an enemy platoon from a well prepared position, accounted for numerous enemy casualties, and averted further friendly casualties. Sp4 Wright's extraordinary heroism, courage, and indomitable fighting spirit saved the lives of many of his comrades and inflicted serious damage on the enemy. His acts were in keeping with the highest traditions of the military service and reflect great credit upon himself and the U.S. Army.

== See also ==
- List of Medal of Honor recipients
- List of Medal of Honor recipients for the Vietnam War
