= 60th Infantry Regiment (United States) =

- Coat of arms
- Active: 1917–21; 1927–46; 1947–present
- Country: United States
- Branch: United States Army
- Type: Basic training
- Part of: 193rd Infantry Brigade
- Garrison/HQ: Fort Jackson
- Nickname: "Go Devils"
- Motto: "To the Utmost Extent of Our Power"
- Engagements: World War I World War II; Vietnam War

Commanders
- Current commander: 2nd Bn LTC Richard Bailey; 3rd Bn LTC Jarrod Parker

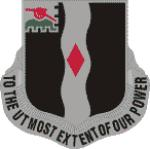
Distinctive unit insignia

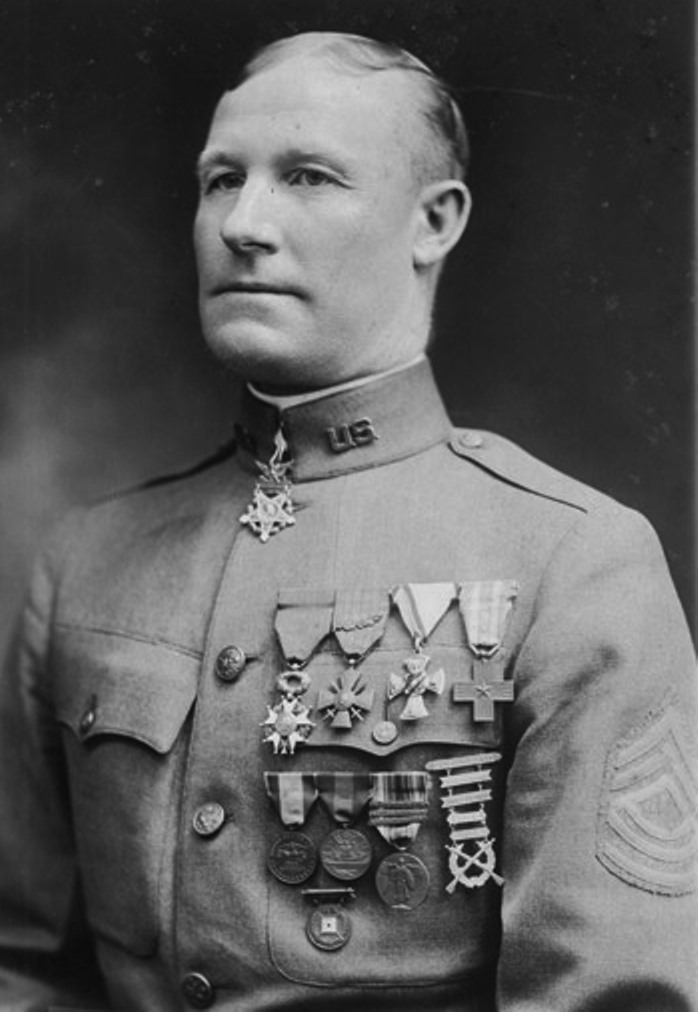
M/Sgt Samuel Woodfill

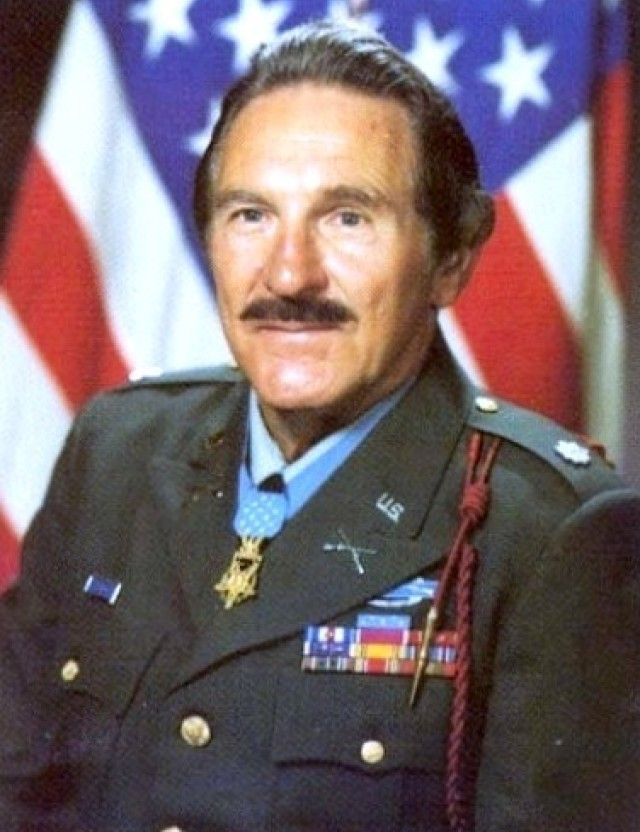
Lt Col Matt Urban

The U.S. 60th Infantry Regiment is a regimental unit in the United States Army. Its 2nd and 3rd Battalion conduct Basic Combat Training.

Participating in three wars on three continents, the 60th has played a conspicuous role in the achievements of 5th Division in World War I and 9th Infantry Division in World War II and Vietnam. The regimental crest reflects this. The cannon in the embattled canton refers to the 7th Infantry Regiment that provided the cadre who activated the regiment; it is a principal charge in the 7th's arms. The silver vertical wavy line makes reference to the Regiment's crossing of the Meuse River in World War I; and the red diamond is the unit patch for the US Fifth Infantry Division, to which the 60th was assigned in the First World War.

== World War I ==
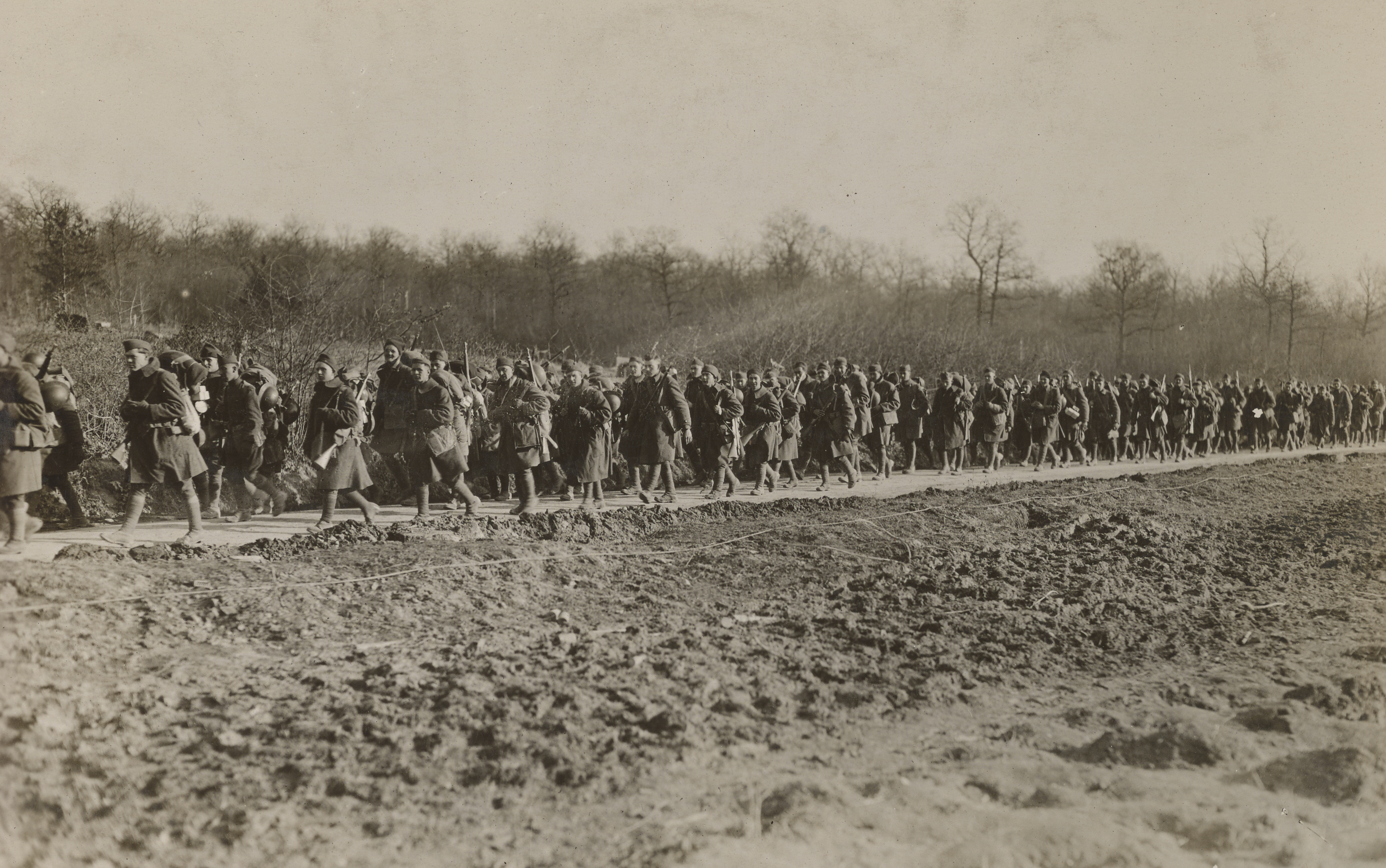
Doughboys of the 3rd Battalion, 60th Infantry, 5th Division near Louppy-sur-Loison, Meuse, France, November 23, 1918.

The 60th Infantry was organized in June 1917, two months after the American entry into World War I, from cadre furnished by the 7th Infantry Regiment. In November it was assigned to the 5th Division and underwent its baptism of fire on the Western Front the following year. The regiment participated in the campaigns of St. Mihiel, Alsace and Lorraine and finally in the Meuse–Argonne offensive. During this battle, First Lieutenant Samuel Woodfill, later called by General John J. "Black Jack" Pershing, Commander-in-Chief (C-in-C) of the American Expeditionary Forces (AEF) on the Western Front, "the outstanding doughboy of the war", was awarded the Medal of Honor for leading his men in the destruction of enemy positions in the Bois de la Pultiere near Cunel, Meuse, France. Lieutenant Woodfill personally killed a German officer and two members of a machine gun crew using his pistol, his trench knife, and a pickaxe. He and his men also captured a number of enemy soldiers and their weapons.

== Interwar period ==
The 60th Infantry arrived at the port of New York on 20 July 1919 on the RMS Aquitania and was transferred on 26 July 1919 to Camp Gordon, Georgia. The regiment was transferred on 6 October 1920 to Camp Jackson, South Carolina, and was inactivated on 2 September 1921 and allotted to the Fifth Corps Area; the 6th Infantry Regiment had previously been designated as "Active Associate" on 27 July 1921, and would provide the personnel with which the 60th Infantry would be reconstituted in the event of war. The personnel of the 60th Infantry were concurrently transferred to the 6th Infantry. The 6th Infantry was relieved as Active Associate on 17 July 1922 and the 10th Infantry was designated as Active Associate. The 10th Infantry was relieved as Active Associate on 28 February 1927, and with the abandonment of the Active Associate concept, the headquarters, 60th Infantry, was organized about June 1927 with Organized Reserve personnel as a "Regular Army Inactive" unit with headquarters at Columbus, Ohio.

The 60th Infantry was relieved from the 5th Division on 15 August 1927 and assigned to the 8th Division. It was affiliated with the Ohio State University Reserve Officers' Training Corps (ROTC) program on 28 April 1930 and organized at Columbus with Regular Army personnel assigned to the ROTC Detachment and Reserve officers commissioned from the program. The regiment was relieved from the 8th Division on 1 October 1933 and assigned to the 5th Division. It conducted a mobilization test 13–26 October 1935 at Columbus. It was relieved on 16 October 1939 from the 5th Division and assigned on 1 August 1940 to the 9th Division. The regiment conducted summer training at Fort Thomas, Kentucky, and some years at Fort Benjamin Harrison, Indiana, or Fort Knox, Kentucky, and also conducted infantry Citizens Military Training Camps some years at Fort Thomas or Fort Benjamin Harrison as an alternate form of summer training.

== World War II ==
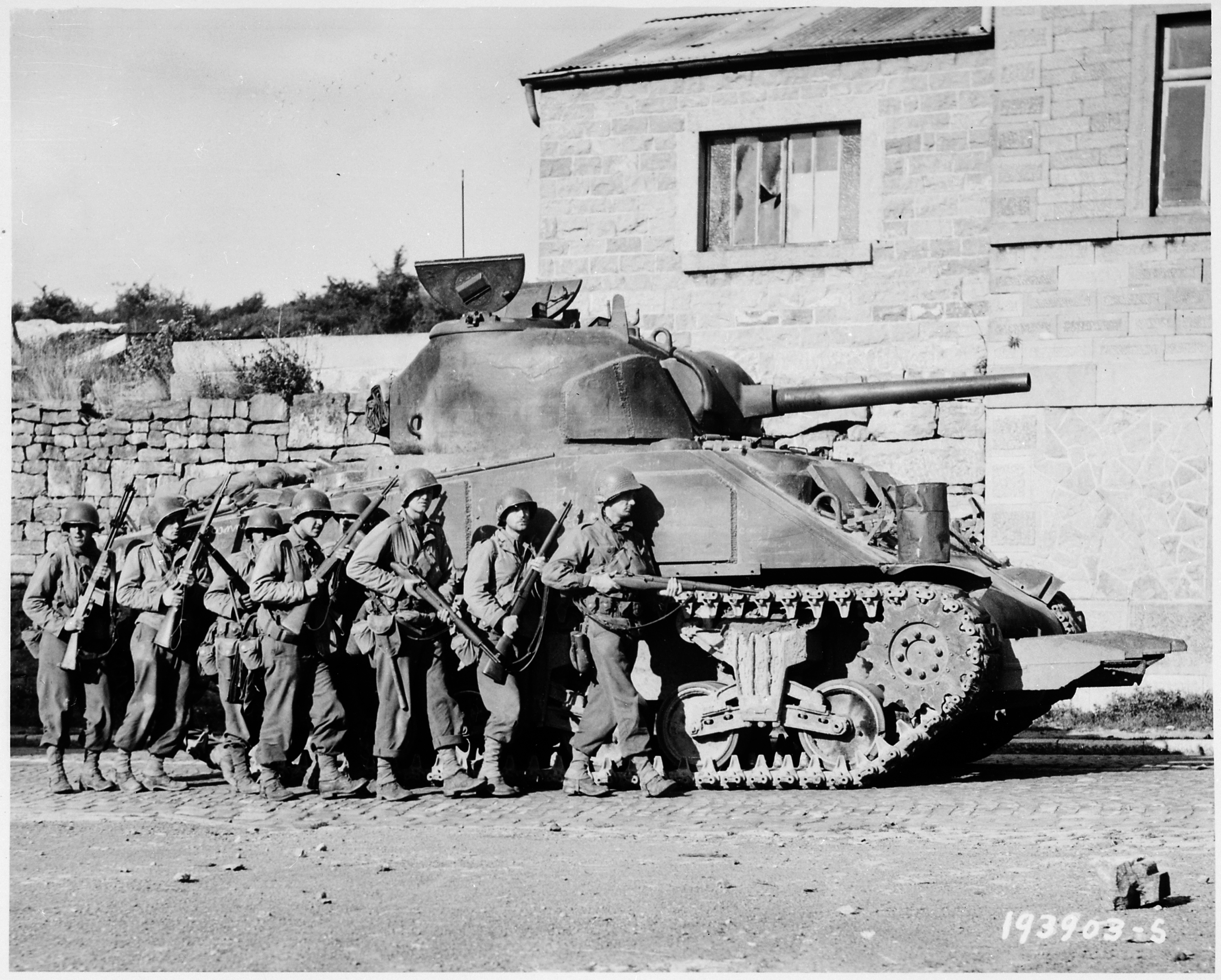
G.I.'s of the 60th Infantry Regiment in Belgium, 9 September 1944, supported by a modified Sherman.

A generation later during World War II, in August 1940, war in Europe resulted in a rapid expansion of the U.S. Army. The 60th Infantry was reactivated on 10 August 1940, less Reserve personnel, at Fort Bragg, North Carolina.

The 60th Infantry spearheaded the November 1942, Allied invasion of French Morocco at Port Lyautey during Operation Torch, crediting each member of the unit that made the amphibious assault landing the arrowhead device. The landing under fire laid the basis for its nickname 'Scouts Out'. At the time of the invasion, there was great confusion among the Navy coxswains about the landing sites. They either placed the infantry units in the wrong sector, or put them on the beaches very late. The 60th Infantry, for example, landed at 05:30, 40 minutes late, giving the defending Vichy French time to organize. The 60th Infantry's 1st Battalion landed 2,800 yards north of their assigned beach, and were engaged by French light tanks once ashore. Its 2nd and 3rd Battalions were strafed by French planes. Company E, 2nd Battalion, was stopped completely at a strongpoint, the Port Lyautey lighthouse. The 2nd Battalion's eventual objective was to take an ancient fortress called the Kasba. Once the landing points were completely secured, engagements were fought between small units and opposing batteries. The 60th Infantry culminated its successful North African campaigns with a defense on 18 April 1943 (Easter Sunday) against a massive German attack.

The 2nd Battalion, 60th Infantry earned the regiment's and the 9th Division's, first Presidential Unit Citation for its actions on 23 and 24 April during the Battle of Sedjenane. The Germans hit the 2nd Battalion from all four sides with two infantry battalions supported by artillery. After a four-hour attack that failed, the Germans left 116 dead, 48 wounded, and many prisoners in American hands. During the 60th Infantry's drive along the Tunisia-Algeria border, the regiment captured a German general's diary which gave the regiment its nickname, the "Go Devils". In his account of American actions against the Germans, the general wrote, "Look at those devils go!" The 60th Infantry thereafter became known as the "Go Devils". During the battle Sergeant William L. Nelson was posthumously awarded the Medal of Honor.

During the Allied invasion of Sicily, the 60th Infantry continued its victorious ways, culminating in the famous Silent March ("Ghost March"), where the regiment infiltrated enemy lines and broke open the last of the German resistance. On 5 August 1943, the 60th Infantry landed at Palermo, Sicily. Their first combat action there was the first of the infiltrations they would make in Sicily. The 60th Infantry flanked the city of Troina, which forced the German artillery protecting their infantrymen in the city to withdraw, allowing other U.S. divisions to easily swallow up the Germans in the city. Next, the 60th Infantry chased the retreating Germans east towards Randazzo. The pursuit was hindered by a number booby traps, demolitions, anti-tank and personnel mines, craters and blown bridges. Regardless, the 60th Infantry completed its flanking movement around Randazzo, which allowed the 39th Infantry Regiment, 9th Infantry Division, to take Randazzo and open the road to Messina which was taken on 17 August. Rest and further training followed for some two months. On 11 November 1943, the 60th Infantry embarked for Winchester, Hampshire, England.

On 11 June 1944, the 60th Infantry debarked at Utah Beach on the Cotentin Peninsula, Normandy, France. On 12 June, driving hard toward the St. Colombe in France, the 2nd Battalion, 60th Infantry completely outdistanced the rest of the 9th Division. For a time, the 60th Regiment was believed to be lost. Actually, its 2nd Battalion had overrun the German defenses in the face of murderous fire and had cut the main highway to the northwest. Instead of withdrawing, the battalion set up a bridgehead on the Douve River and held the position for seven hours until the rest of the 9th Division caught up to them, thus facilitating the cutting of the peninsula. Due to this demonstration of rapid penetration and maneuver, the "Scouts Out" motto originated for the 2nd Battalion. "Scouts Out" is the official greeting of the 2nd Battalion, 60th Infantry.

In France during June 1944, the 60th Infantry once again led the way for the 9th Division as it spearheaded the American advance out of the beachhead that cut the Contentin Peninsula. While the 39th and 47th Infantry Regiments of the 9th Division secured the vital Port of Cherburg, the 60th Infantry cleared Cape La Hague, northwest of Cherbourg, where Medal of Honor recipient Second Lieutenant John E. Butts was killed. At the pivotal crossing of the Douve River, Lieutenant Butts earned the Medal of Honor and the 2nd Battalion earned its second Presidential Unit Citation. Following the breakout at St. Lo, the 60th Infantry rushed south during Operation Cobra and helped relieve the battered 30th Infantry Division, that had been surrounded by the Germans in their own counterattack (Operation Luttich). Next, the 60th Infantry turned east and helped in the closure and clearing of the Falaise pocket. Continuing east, the 60th Infantry crossed the Marne, Aisne, and the Seine Rivers in a matter of days. Next the 60th Infantry entered Belgium and made its second combat crossing of the Meuse River. In this action, Medal of Honor recipient, Lieutenant Colonel Matt Urban was wounded for the seventh time after having gone AWOL from a hospital to rejoin the 2nd Battalion and lead them in combat.

After the bitter and bloody struggle in the Huertegen Forest, the 60th Infantry fell back to the Monschau area where its efforts won it a third Presidential Unit Citation in the snow and bitter cold of the Battle of the Bulge. The 60th Infantry then was the first to capture the Schwammanuel Dam on the Roer River. Continuing south, the regiment was one of the first to cross the Rhine at Remagen. After expanding the bridgehead, the regiment shot northeast, where they helped seal and destroy the Ruhr Pocket. Continuing northeast, the 60th Infantry advanced toward the Harz Mountains, where for the first time the regiment had attached to them a platoon of black volunteers. While destroying a German roadblock, one of the volunteers, Private First Class Jack Thomas, won the Distinguished Service Cross for extraordinary heroism. After relieving the 3rd Armored Division, the 60th Infantry held that line until VE day, and met up with Russian soldiers soon after. For their actions in Central Europe, the regiment was awarded a fourth Presidential Unit Citation. The 60th Infantry was inactivated in November 1946 while on occupation duty in Germany.

== Vietnam War ==
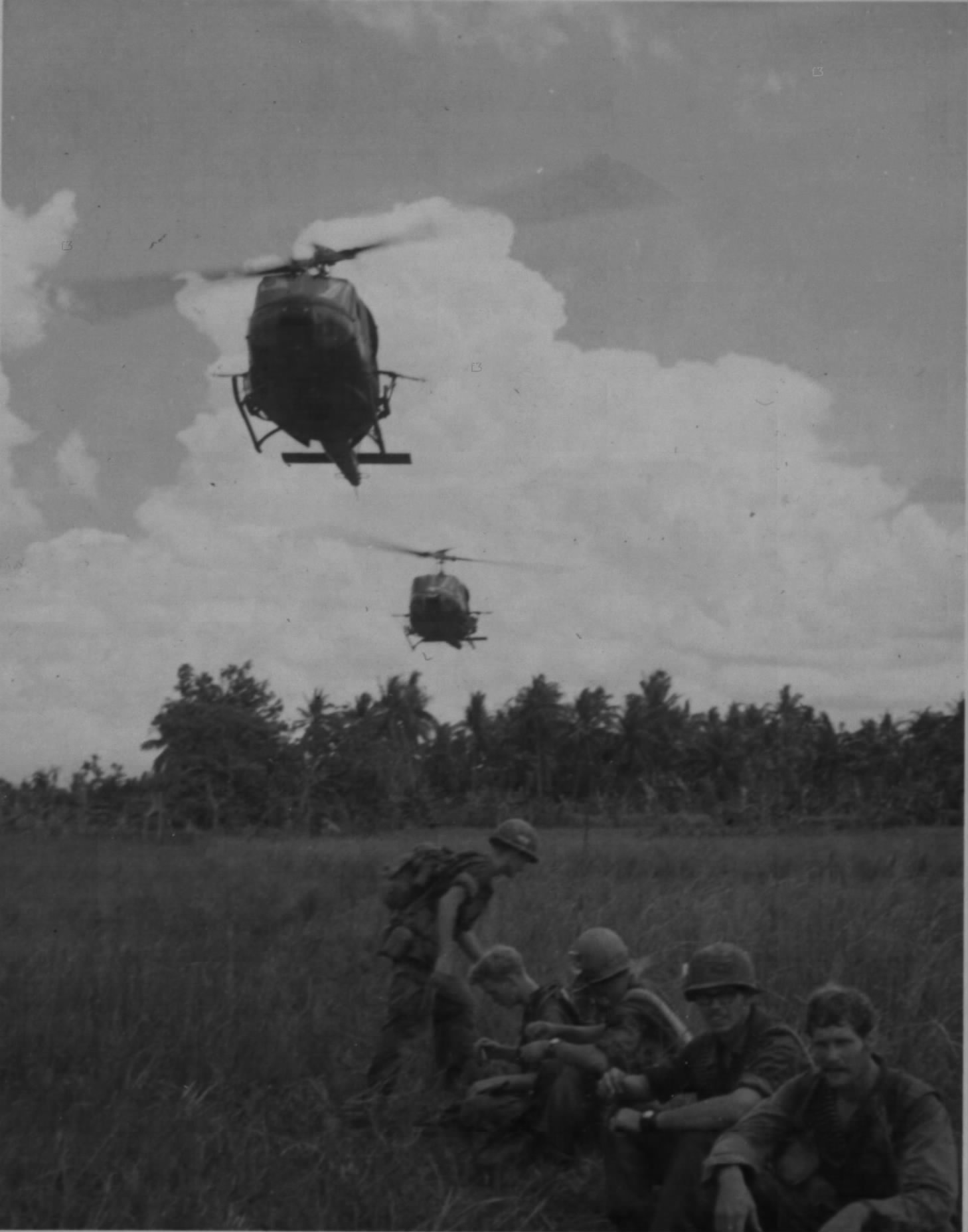
UH-1D helicopters come in to pick up members of Company "D", 3rd Battalion, 60th Infantry, 2 July 1969

After service as the 2nd Battle Group, 60th Infantry from 1958 to 1962, three battalions (2/60, 3/60, and 5/60 Mechanized) were activated at Fort Riley, Kansas, and assigned to the 9th Infantry Division for its deployment to the Republic of Vietnam in December 1966. The 9th Division was the only major U.S. combat unit to conduct operations in the Mekong Delta. On 13 September 1968, the 5th/60th Mech was "swapped" with the 1st/16th of the 1st Infantry Division. From then until August 1970, the 5th/60th operated as a "straight leg" infantry unit. The battalions of the 60th Infantry participated in both Riverine operations and "jitterbug tactics" which featured split-second timing of airmobile insertions in close proximity to enemy units. These operations enabled the battalions to be awarded unit citations and campaign streamers, including one Presidential Unit Citation. Beginning with the 3rd Brigade in July 1969, the 9th Infantry Division was the first US Division to be withdrawn from Vietnam. [Although 'Old Reliables' were returning to the United States, from the Summer of 1969 on into the Fall of 1970, units of the 3rd Brigade remained in the Mekong Delta; operating under the command of the 25th Infantry Division in Cu Chi] The Division returned to Ft. Lewis, Washington, in 1970 where its battalions were inactivated.

During the 1960s and 1970s the 1st Battalion, 60th Infantry was active as an element of the 172d Infantry Brigade in Alaska and did not deploy to Vietnam. The unit existed into the early 1980s when it was reflagged as a battalion of the 327th Infantry, as were the other two battalions of the brigade, forming the 4th, 5th and 6th Battalions, 327th Infantry. These were aligned with the 1st, 2d and 3d Battalions, 327th, then under the 1st Brigade, 101st Airborne Division (Air Assault) at Fort Campbell, KY.

== Cold War ==
The 1st Battalion, 60th Infantry was assigned to the 172d Infantry Brigade at Fort Richardson, Alaska. The 2d Battalion, 60th Infantry was reactivated on 21 October 1972 at Fort Lewis where it became the first motorized unit in the Army. It was used as an advanced training unit in highly maneuverable tactics using newly outfitted Humvees with TOW missile systems, Mk-19s and M2s.

The 3d Battalion, 60th Infantry was located at Fort Lewis from 1972 to 1988 and was primarily a "straight leg" (regular) infantry unit trained in airmobile operations until the unit with equipped TOW missile systems mounted on Humvees in the latter part of 1986. From November 1985 to June 1986 the 3-60th was deployed to the Sinai in Egypt, replacing the 101st Airborne Division (Air Assault) as the first regular infantry unit deployed for Multinational Force and Observers (MFO) service (attached to the 101st Airborne Division).

== Desert Shield/Storm ==
The unit was mobilized to NTC at Fort Irwin, CA, in preparation for deployment to the Middle East during Desert Shield and was used to train National Guard units at the start of Desert Storm. It was then inactivated at Fort Lewis and relieved from assignment to the 9th Infantry Division in February 1991. During the drawdown of the 9th Infantry Division at Fort Lewis in 1991–1992, a residual brigade, based around the division's 3d Brigade, was briefly active as the 199th Infantry Brigade (Separate)(Motorized). The brigade's 2-60th Infantry was reorganized and reflagged as 1-33d Armor; later the entire brigade was reorganized and reflagged as the 2d Armored Cavalry Regiment.

== Currently ==
The 60th Infantry Regiment was assigned to the Training and Doctrine Command on 27 August 1996, with the 2d Battalion activated at Fort Jackson, South Carolina.

The 2d Battalion "Scouts Out" and 3d Battalion, 60th Infantry Regiment "River Raiders" are currently assigned to the 193d Infantry Brigade at Fort Jackson, South Carolina, along with the 1st, 2d, and 3d Battalions, 13th Infantry Regiment. The battalions are organized for basic combat training with Companies A through F in each battalion.

== Lineage ==
- Constituted 15 May 1917 in the Regular Army as the 60th Infantry
- Organized 10 June 1917 at Gettysburg National Park, Pennsylvania
- Assigned 17 November 1917 to the 5th Division
- Inactivated 2 September 1921 at Fort Jackson, South Carolina
- Relieved 15 August 1927 from assignment to the 5th Division and assigned to the 8th Division.
- Relieved 1 October 1933 from assignment to the 8th Division and assigned to the 5th Division
- Relieved 16 October 1939 from assignment to the 5th Division
- Assigned 1 August 1940 to the 9th Division (later redesignated as the 9th Infantry Division)
- Activated 10 August 1940 at Fort Bragg, North Carolina
- Moved to Chester, South Carolina, for maneuvers, and returned to Fort Bragg.
- Transferred to Norfolk, Virginia, on 18 September 1942 for Amphibious Training.
- Departed Hampton Roads Port of Embarkation on 27 October 1942 for North Africa.
- Assaulted North Africa on 8 November 1942.
- Landed in Sicily on 31 July 1943.
- Arrived in England on 25 November 1943.
- Landed in France on 11 June 1944.
- Crossed into Belgium on 2 September 1944.
- Entered Germany on 15 September 1944.
- Attached to 104th Infantry Division from 18 December 1944 to 21 December 1944.
- Attached to 2nd Armored Division from 22 December 1944 to 23 December 1944.
- Attached to 9th Armored Division from 4 March 1945 to 5 March 1945.
- Attached to 7th Armored Division from 8 March 1945 to 9 March 1945.
- Attached to 3rd Armored Division from 22 April 1944 to 24 April 1945.
- On Occupation Duty at Geisenfeld, Germany on VJ Day
- Inactivated 30 November – 28 December 1946 in Germany
- Activated 15 July 1947 at Fort Dix, New Jersey
- Relieved 1 December 1957 from assignment to the 9th Infantry Division and reorganized as a parent regiment under the Combat Arms Regimental System
- Activated December 1966 and assigned to the 9th Infantry Division for deployment to Vietnam
- Withdrawn 1970 from Vietnam and inactivated
- Activated 1976 9th Infantry Division, 2nd Brigade (Triple Threat), Fort Lewis, Washington
- Withdrawn 16 June 1986 from the Combat Arms Regimental System and reorganized under the United States Army Regimental System
- Transferred 15 April 1996 to the United States Army Training and Doctrine Command
- Present Day: Assigned to 193rd Infantry Brigade, Ft Jackson, South Carolina

== Medal of Honor recipients ==
Nine soldiers of the 60th Infantry were awarded the Medal of Honor:

World War I

- Captain Edward Allworth
- First Lieutenant Samuel Woodfill

World War II

- Second Lieutenant John E. Butts, Company E, 2nd Battalion
- Sergeant William L. Nelson, 2nd Battalion
- Captain Matt Urban, 2nd Battalion

Vietnam War

- Sergeant Leonard B. Keller, Company A, 3rd Battalion
- Private First Class Thomas James Kinsman, Company B, 3rd Battalion
- Private First Class Clarence Sasser, Headquarters Company, 3rd Battalion
- Specialist Four Raymond R. Wright, Company A, 3rd Battalion

== Campaign participation credit ==
World War I (4)

- St. Mihiel
- Meuse-Argonne
- Alsace 1918
- Lorraine 1918

World War II (8)

- Algeria-French Morocco (Arrowhead device)
- Tunisia
- Sicily
- Normandy
- Northern France
- Rhineland
- Ardennes-Alsace
- Central Europe

Vietnam (11)

- Counteroffensive, Phase II
- Counteroffensive, Phase III
- Tet Counteroffensive
- Counteroffensive, Phase IV
- Counteroffensive, Phase V
- Counteroffensive, Phase VI
- Tet 69/Counteroffensive
- Summer-Fall 1969
- Winter-Spring 1970
- Sanctuary Counteroffensive
- Counteroffensive, Phase VII

== Unit awards ==
US unit decorations

- Presidential Unit Citation (Army), 2nd Battalion, 23–24 April 1943, for SEDJENANE VALLEY
- Presidential Unit Citation (Army), 2nd Battalion, June 1943, for STE. COLOMBE
- Presidential Unit Citation (Army), 3rd Battalion, 1944, for SCHWAMMANAUEL DAMS
- Presidential Unit Citation (Army) for MEKONG DELTA
- Presidential Unit Citation (Army) for DINH TUONG PROVINCE
- Valorous Unit Award for SAIGON
- Valorous Unit Award for FISH HOOK

Foreign unit decorations

- French Croix de Guerre with Palm for COTENTIN PENINSULA, WW II
- Belgian Fourragere 1940, 2nd Battalion, for being cited twice, WW II
- Belgian Croix de guere with Palm; cited in the Order of the Day of the Belgian Army for action at the Meuse River
- Cited in the Order of the Day of the Belgian Army for action in the Ardennes
