= Peter J. Dalessandro =

US Army Medal of Honor recipient and politician (1918–1997)

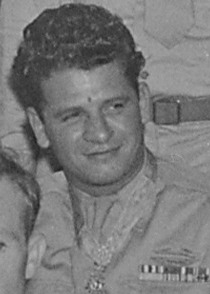
- Peter Dalessandro after receiving his Medal of Honor from President Harry S. Truman on August 23, 1945
- Born: May 18, 1918; Watervliet, New York, U.S.
- Died: October 15, 1997 (aged 79)
- Burial place: Gerald B.H. Solomon Saratoga National Cemetery, Schuylerville, Saratoga County, New York
- Military career
- Allegiance: United States of America
- Branch: United States Army
- Rank: Technical Sergeant
- Units: 1st Battalion, 39th Infantry Regiment
- Conflicts: World War II
- Awards: Medal of Honor; Silver Star; Purple Heart
- Other work: Prisoner of war New York State Senator

Medal of Honor

Peter Joseph Dalessandro (May 18, 1918 – October 15, 1997) was a United States Army soldier who earned the United States' highest military honor – the Medal of Honor – on December 22, 1944, for action occurring in the European Theatre of Operations during World War II.

== Medal of Honor citation ==
Rank and organization: Technical Sergeant, U.S. Army, Company E, 39th Infantry, 9th Infantry Division.
Place and date: Near Kalterherberg, Germany, December 22, 1944.
Entered service at: Watervliet, N.Y.
Born: May 19, 1918, Watervliet, N.Y.
G.O. No.: 73, August 30, 1945.

Citation:

He was with the 1st Platoon holding an important road junction on high ground near Kalterherberg, Germany, on 22 December 1944. In the early morning hours, the enemy after laying down an intense artillery and mortar barrage, followed through with an all-out attack that threatened to overwhelm the position. T/Sgt. Dalessandro, seeing that his men were becoming disorganized, braved the intense fire to move among them with words of encouragement. Advancing to a fully exposed observation post, he adjusted mortar fire upon the attackers, meanwhile firing upon them with his rifle and encouraging his men in halting and repulsing the attack. Later in the day the enemy launched a second determined attack. Once again, T/Sgt. Dalessandro, in the face of imminent death, rushed to his forward position and immediately called for mortar fire. After exhausting his rifle ammunition, he crawled 30 yards over exposed ground to secure a light machine gun, returned to his position, and fired upon the enemy at almost point blank range until the gun jammed. He managed to get the gun to fire 1 more burst, which used up his last round, but with these bullets he killed 4 German soldiers who were on the verge of murdering an aid man and 2 wounded soldiers in a nearby foxhole. When the enemy had almost surrounded him, he remained alone, steadfastly facing almost certain death or capture, hurling grenades and calling for mortar fire closer and closer to his outpost as he covered the withdrawal of his platoon to a second line of defense. As the German hordes swarmed about him, he was last heard calling for a barrage, saying, "OK, mortars, let me have it – right in this position!" The gallantry and intrepidity shown by T/Sgt. Dalessandro against an overwhelming enemy attack saved his company from complete rout.

He was captured during the battle and spent the rest of the war as a prisoner of war.

== After the war ==
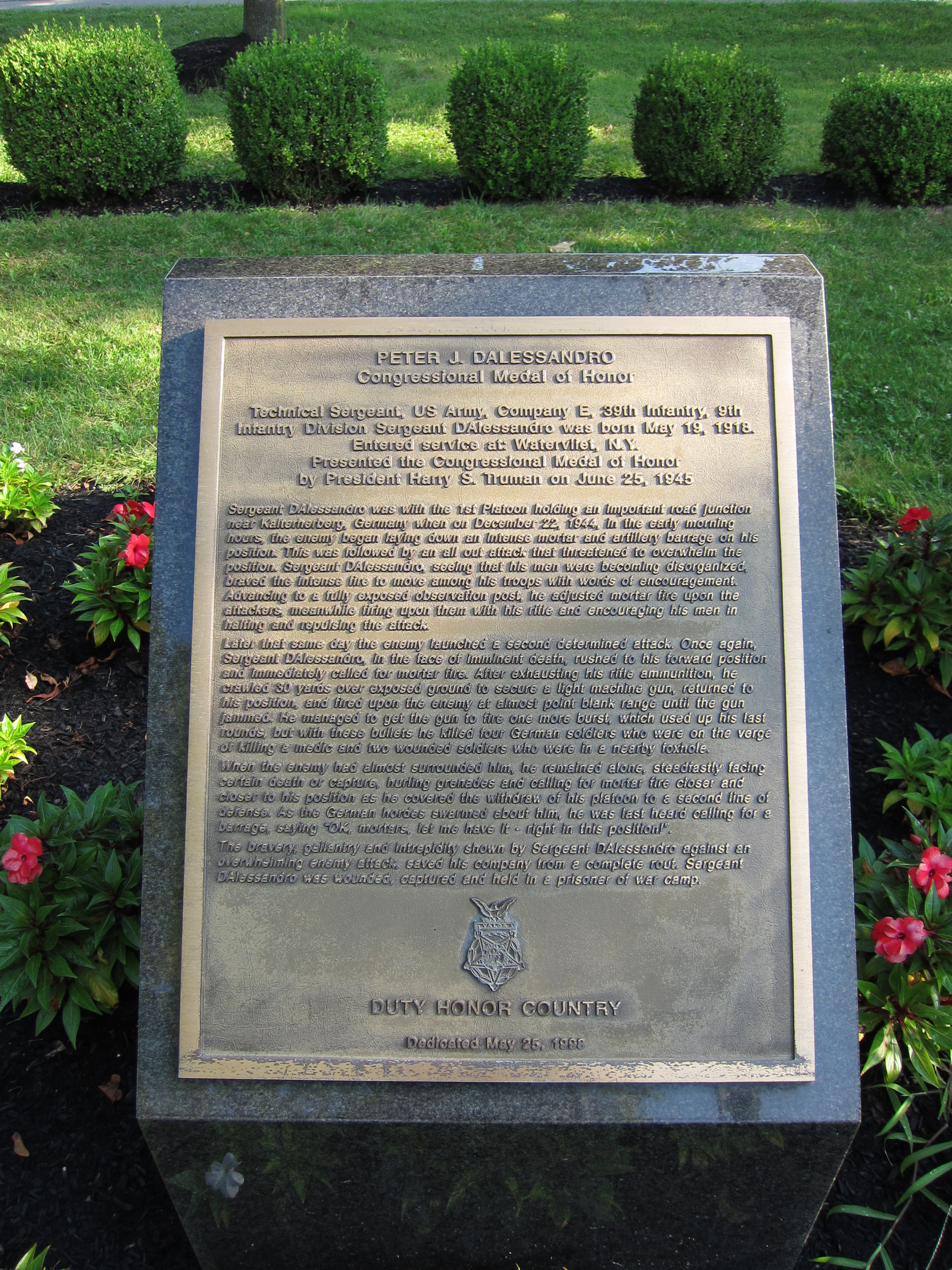
Peter J. Dalessandro memorial in Watervliet, New York

After returning home a war hero, Dalessandro was elected as a Democrat to the New York State Senate in 1947, representing the 35th district from 1947 to 1954 and the 36th from 1955 until his resignation in 1957. He was a member of the American Legion, Catholic War Veterans, Veterans of Foreign Wars and the Elks.

He died in 1997 and was buried in the Gerald B.H. Solomon Saratoga National Cemetery, Schuylerville, Saratoga County, New York.

== Honors ==
A portion of County Route 151 alongside Albany International Airport has been named in his honor in Colonie, New York.

== See also ==
- List of Medal of Honor recipients
- List of Medal of Honor recipients for World War II

New York State Senate
Preceded by Mortimer A. Cullen	New York State Senate; 35th District; 1947–1954	Succeeded by Ernest I. Hatfield
Preceded by Gilbert T. Seelye	New York State Senate; 36th District; 1955–1957	Succeeded by Julian B. Erway
