= Rumsfeld v. Forum for Academic & Institutional Rights, Inc. =

Rumsfeld v. Forum For Academic and Institutional Rights, Inc.
- Supreme Court of the United States

Argued December 6, 2005 Decided March 6, 2006
- Full case name: Donald H. Rumsfeld, Secretary of Defense, et al. v. Forum for Academic and Institutional Rights, Inc., et al.
- Docket no.: 04-1152
- Citations: 547 U.S. 47 (more) 126 S. Ct. 1297; 164 L. Ed. 2d 156; 2006 U.S. LEXIS 2025; 74 U.S.L.W. 4159; 2006 WL 521237
- Decision: Opinion

Case history
- Prior: Defendant's motion to dismiss denied, 291 F. Supp. 2d 269 (D.N.J. 2003), rev'd, 390 F.3d 219 (3d Cir. 2004), cert. granted, 125 S. Ct. 1977 (2005).

Holding
- Because Congress could require law schools to provide equal access to military recruiters without violating the schools' freedoms of speech and association, the Third Circuit erred in holding that the Solomon Amendment likely violates the First Amendment.

Court membership
- Chief Justice John Roberts Associate Justices John P. Stevens · Antonin Scalia; Anthony Kennedy · David Souter; Clarence Thomas · Ruth Bader Ginsburg; Stephen Breyer · Samuel Alito

Case opinion
- Majority: Roberts, joined by Stevens, Scalia, Kennedy, Souter, Thomas, Ginsburg, Breyer
- Alito took no part in the consideration or decision of the case.

Laws applied
- U.S. Const. amend. I; 10 U.S.C. § 983(b)(1) (Solomon Amendment)

Rumsfeld v. Forum for Academic and Institutional Rights, Inc., 547 U.S. 47 (2006), was a United States Supreme Court case in which the Court ruled that the federal government, under the Solomon Amendment, could constitutionally withhold funding from universities if they refuse to give military recruiters access to school resources. Law schools were unwilling to allow recruiters onto campus because they considered the military's so-called "Don't ask, don't tell" policy discriminatory. The Supreme Court held oral arguments on December 6, 2005, and issued an 8–0 decision on March 6, 2006, finding the Solomon Amendment constitutional.

== Background ==
In 1993, Congress passed the "Don't ask, don't tell" policy, codified at 10 U.S.C. § 654, which required that the military discharge a member who (with certain exceptions):

[H]as engaged in, attempted to engage in, or solicited another to engage in a homosexual act or acts ... [Or if] the member has stated that he or she is a homosexual or bisexual, or words to that effect, unless there is a further finding ... [made] [t]hat the member has demonstrated that he or she is not a person who engages in, attempts to engage in, has the propensity to engage in, or intends to engage in homosexual acts ... [Or if] the member has married or attempted to marry a person known to be of the same biological sex.

Many law schools had policies denying campus access to recruiters from employers who did not comply with their anti-discrimination policies. Objecting to the military's "Don't ask, don't tell" policy as discriminatory, the schools refused to permit military recruiters on-campus. Congress responded by passing the Solomon Amendment, which required colleges and universities who receive federal money to allow military recruiters onto their campuses like recruiters for other employers.

In Fall of 2003, Forum for the Academic & Institution Rights, Inc. (FAIR), an association of law schools and law faculty asked the United States District Court for the District of New Jersey to enjoin enforcement of the Solomon Amendment on the grounds it violated their First Amendment rights to free speech and freedom of association. The District Court ruled against FAIR. FAIR then appealed to the United States Circuit Court of Appeals for the Third Circuit, which found in November 2004 that FAIR had "demonstrated a likelihood of success on the merits of its First Amendment claims and that it is entitled to preliminary injunctive relief."

Secretary Rumsfeld's position was represented before the Supreme Court by the Solicitor General, Paul Clement. E. Joshua Rosenkranz presented FAIR's oral argument.

== Opinion of the Court ==
The Court, in an 8–0 opinion written by Chief Justice Roberts, held that the government could deny federal funds to schools that do not permit recruitment. The court noted that the Solomon Amendment neither denies the institutions the right to speak, nor requires them to say anything. The opinion also holds that Congress, through the "raise and support Armies" clause, could even directly force schools to allow recruiting without threatening the withholding of funds, if they so desired, and that, as a result, no question of "unconstitutional conditions" arises.
