= The Post-Star =

Newspaper in Glens Falls, New York

- Type: Daily newspaper
- Format: Broadsheet
- Owner: Lee Enterprises
- President: Ben Rogers
- Editor: Lisa Reider
- Founded: 1904
- Language: English
- Headquarters: 333 Glen Street; Glens Falls, NY 12801; United States
- Circulation: 15,866 Daily (as of 2023)
- ISSN: 0897-0505
- Website: poststar.com
- Free online archives: nyshistoricnewspapers.org (1909-1930)

The Post-Star is a daily newspaper in Glens Falls, New York. It serves the counties of Warren, Washington and Saratoga in New York State including the cities of Glens Falls and Saratoga Springs. The newspaper competes with The Saratogian of Saratoga Springs and the Times Union of Albany for the Saratoga County market.

== History ==
The current Post-Star newspaper traces its roots to 1904 with the founding of a paper called The Morning Post.

In 1909 the owners of The Morning Post acquired a competing newspaper called The Morning Star and merged the two papers into The Post-Star.

The newspaper was sold in 1971 by longtime publisher and major shareholder Arthur Irving Sr. to Howard Publications.

The Post-Star is currently owned by Lee Enterprises out of Davenport, Iowa. Lee has controlled the paper since February 12, 2002, when it merged with Howard Publications.

On April 20, 2009, the Post-Star won its first Pulitzer Prize, for the editorial work of Mark Mahoney.

For a time, the Post-Star maintained two distinctly different online presences. PostStar.net was an all-inclusive, subscription-based offering; Poststar.com offers the reader a few free articles per month, requiring a subscription beyond that. As of April 2007, PostStar.net ceased operation.

Starting July 11, 2023, the print edition of the newspaper will be reduced to three days a week: Tuesday, Thursday and Saturday. Also, the newspaper will transition from being delivered by a traditional newspaper delivery carrier to mail delivery by the U.S. Postal Service.
