= List of New York State Historic Markers in Saratoga County, New York =

This is an incomplete list of New York State Historic Markers in Saratoga County, New York.

== Listings county-wide ==
	Marker name	Image	Date designated	Location	City or Town	Coords	Marker text
2	COLONIAL INN			On Middle Line Road About 1½ Mi. S/w. Of	Ballston, Town Of, New York		This Building Erected In 1797 Was For Many Years A Public Tavern
3	ELIPHALET BALL			On Nys 50 About 3Mis. S. Of Ballston Spa	Ballston, Town Of, New York		1722-1797 Site of original home founder, Ballston, 1770 established first real settlement in Ballston
4	HOME OF JAMES GORDON			On Middle Line Road about 3/4 Mi. North Of Ballston Center	Ballston, Town Of, New York		Colonel Revolutionary War Member of Assembly, State Senator first supervisor Town Ballston Member of Congress Washington Visited Here 1783
5	HOME OF JOHN W. TAYLOR			On Nys 67 At Ballston Spa	Ballston, Town Of, New York		Member Of Congress 1831-33 Speaker Of The House Of Representatives 1821–1827 State Senator 1840
6	HOME OF SAMUEL YOUNG			On Nys 50 About 3 Mi. South Of Ballston Spa	Ballston, Town Of, New York		Member Of Assembly 1814 Speaker of Assembly 1815 State Senator 1819, 33,34,45,47 Candidate For Governor Of N.Y., 1824. Died Here 1850
7	MCDONALDS			On Front St., Ballston Spa	Ballston, Town Of, New York		Ballston-Saratoga Mineral Springs Were Revealed To White Men By Michael And Nicholas Mcdonald About 1765
8	MCDONALDS SITE			On NYS Route 50 About 3/4 Mile S. Of Ballston Center	Ballston, Town Of, New York		At Shore Of Ballston Lake 1/2 Mile From This Spot Michael & Nicholas Mcdonald Built First Cabin In This Section Of State In 1763
9	BALLSTON CHURCH			NE corner of Middle Line and Charlton roads	Ballston, Town Of, New York		Congregation formed 1771 by Rev. Eliphalet Ball. Fourth house of worship built 1859. Church burned in Oct. 1993, steeple saved. Rebuilt to the glory of God in 1994.
10	SITE OF REV BALL'S LOG CHURCH-1771			NW corner of Charlton Road and NYS Route 50	Ballston, Town Of, New York	42.9562527°N 73.867117°W	Site of Rev. Ball'S log church-1771 Ballston Town Commons-1774 Stockaded fort-1775 Red Meeting House-1780 Ballston Academy-1804
11	SITE OF CHRIST EPISCOPAL CHURCH	>		On Middle Line Road, about 1/4 Mile South Of Ballston Center	Ballston, Town Of, New York		Christ Episcopal Church First Episcopal Church In Saratoga County Erected 1792 Removed To Ballston Spa 1817
12	SITE OF FIRST COURT HOUSE AND JAIL			On Co. Rd. About 1½ Mis. S.w. Of Ballston Spa	Ballston, Town Of, New York		First Court House And Jail Of Saratoga County Erected 1796 Destroyed By Fire, 1816
13	SITE OF HOME BERIAH PALMER			On NYS 146A Near Intersection With NYS 50	Ballston, Town Of, New York		Beriah Palmer Supervisor Ballston 1790-01 Member Of Assembly 1793-95 Member Congress 1803-05 Surrogate Saratoga County
14	THIS BUILDING			On Nys 50 About 1½ Mi. N.e. Of Burnt Hills	Ballston, Town Of, New York		Was A Public Inn During The Revolution. William Bettys, Proprietor
15	TOWN OF BALLSTON			On Nys 339 At Burnt Hills	Ballston, Town Of, New York		Named For Eliphalet Ball Formed From Saratoga As A District April 1, 1775 Organized As A Town March 7, 1788
16	CRESCENT			On north Bank Of Mohawk Near Us 9 At Crescent	Halfmoon, Town Of, New York		Named From Crescent Shape Of Mohawk River At This Point. Site Of Indian Carry From Mohawk River To Hudson River. Site Of Old Crescent Bridge.
17	ON THE BROW OF THE HILL			On Nys 197 At Approach To Bridge To Fort Edward	Moreau, Town Of, New York		Royal Blockhouse Built During French And Indian War
18	BRITISH OVENS			On Bacon Hill-fort Edward County Road	Northumberland, Town Of, New York		In The Hill On The Left Were Two Large Ovens Used By The British Army While Encamped On Adjoining Flats
19	FORT MILLER			On Bacon Hill-fort Edward County Road	Northumberland, Town Of, New York		Built By Col. Miller July 1755
20	GENERAL STARK			On Us 4 At Northumberland	Northumberland, Town Of, New York		Held This Position To Prevent British Retreat To North
21	HOME OF JOHN MCCREA			On Nys 32 At Bacon Hill	Northumberland, Town Of, New York		John Mccrea Brother Of Jane Mccrea Who Was Killed By Indians July 27, 1777
22	HOME OF CAPTAIN MARTIN JOHN BURKE			On Nys 32 At Bacon Hill	Northumberland, Town Of, New York		Captain Martin John Burke B. 1816 - D. 1847 Graduated From West Point 1836; Was Killed In War With Mexico Aug. 20, 1847
23	HOME OF COL. SIDNEY BERRY			On Bacon Hill-fort Edward County Road	Northumberland, Town Of, New York		Col. Sidney Berry Served In Revolution; First Surrogate Of County; First Supervisor Of Town
24	AMERICAN ENTRENCHMENTS			Saratoga National Historical Park	Saratoga Natl. Historical Pk., New York		Battles Of Sept. 19 - Oct. 7, 1777
25	AMERICAN ENTRENCHMENTS			Saratoga National Historical Park	Saratoga Natl. Historical Pk., New York		Battles Of Sept. 19 - Oct. 7, 1777
26	AMERICAN PERIOD			Saratoga National Historical Park	Saratoga Natl. Historical Pk., New York		Block House Site Of Fort Neilson Visitors Welcome 8:30 A.m. To 5:30 P.m.
27	AMERICAN PICKETS			Saratoga National Historical Park	Saratoga Natl. Historical Pk., New York		Held This High Ground South Of Middle Ravine Between The Battles Of Sept. 19 And Oct. 7, 1777
28	AMERICAN PICKETS			Saratoga National Historical Park	Saratoga Natl. Historical Pk., New York		Held This High Ground South Of Middle Ravine Between The Battles Of Sept. 19 And Oct. 7, 1777
29	BATTLE FIELD			Saratoga National Historical Park	Saratoga Natl. Historical Pk., New York		Cemetery Here Lies The Dust Of American Heroes Who Died That The United States Might Be Born
30	BATTLE WELL			Saratoga National Historical Park	Saratoga Natl. Historical Pk., New York		Sought By The Wounded Of Both Armies Scene Of Much Suffering After The Battles Of 1777
31	BREYMANN REDOUBT			Saratoga National Historical Park	Saratoga Natl. Historical Pk., New York		Lasr Engagement Of Battle Of Oct. 7, 1777
32	BRITISH ENTRENCHMENTS			Saratoga National Historical Park	Saratoga Natl. Historical Pk., New York		On Breymann Redoubt
33	BRITISH PICKETS			Saratoga National Historical Park	Saratoga Natl. Historical Pk., New York		Held This High Ground North Of Middle Ravine Between The Battles Of Sept. 19 And Oct. 7, 1777
34	BRITISH PICKETS			Saratoga National Historical Park	Saratoga Natl. Historical Pk., New York		Held This High Ground North Of The Middle Ravine Between The Battles Of Sept. 19 And Oct. 7, 1777
35	BRITISH CENTER			Saratoga National Historical Park	Saratoga Natl. Historical Pk., New York		October 7, 1777 General Riedesel Brunswichers Captain Pausch Battery Of 6 Pounders
36	BRITISH LEFT			Saratoga National Historical Park	Saratoga Natl. Historical Pk., New York		Oct. 7, 1777 Major Acland Grenadiers Major Williams Royal Artillery
37	BRITISH RIGHT			Saratoga National Historical Park	Saratoga Natl. Historical Pk., New York		Oct. 7, 1777 Light Infantry Earl Of Balcarras
38	BURGOYNE BRIDGE			Saratoga National Historical Park	Saratoga Natl. Historical Pk., New York		Built By The Invading Army Of Burgoyne
39	GEN. MORGAN'S RIFLE CORPS			Saratoga National Historical Park	Saratoga Natl. Historical Pk., New York		Attacked The British Redoubt After Wide Flank Movement Behind The Redoubt To The West
40	GENERAL DEARBORN'S			Saratoga National Historical Park	Saratoga Natl. Historical Pk., New York		Light Infantry Left Division American Attack On British Line Of Battle Oct. 7, 1777
41	GENERAL LEARNED'S BRIGADE			Saratoga National Historical Park	Saratoga Natl. Historical Pk., New York		N. Y. And Mass. Regiments Center Division American Attack On British Line Of Battle Oct. 7, 1777
42	GENERAL POOR'S BRIGADE			Saratoga National Historical Park	Saratoga Natl. Historical Pk., New York		N. H. And N. Y. Regiments Right Division American Attack On British Line Of Battle Oct. 7, 1777
43	GREAT REDOUBT			Saratoga National Historical Park	Saratoga Natl. Historical Pk., New York		Scene Of Fighting Of First Battle Held By British Against Attacks By Arnold In Battle Of Oct. 7, 1777
44	HEADQUARTERS			Saratoga National Historical Park	Saratoga Natl. Historical Pk., New York		Of Gen. Arnold Battles Of Sept. 19 - Oct. 7, 1777
45	MAJOR ACLAND			Saratoga National Historical Park	Saratoga Natl. Historical Pk., New York		Made Prisoner Oct. 7, 1777 Fought Duel In Defense Of Valour Of Americans
46	MIDDLE RAVINE			Saratoga National Historical Park	Saratoga Natl. Historical Pk., New York		Separating Hostile Armies Between The Battles Of Saratoga
47	OLD POWDER			Saratoga National Historical Park	Saratoga Natl. Historical Pk., New York		Magazine Battles Of Saratoga 1777 Restored With Original Stone On Exact Site
48	ON THIS SPOT			Saratoga National Historical Park	Saratoga Natl. Historical Pk., New York		Francis Clerke Aide-de-camp To Burgoyne Fell Mortally Wounded October 7, 1777
49	ROAD TO THE MIDDLE RAVINE			Saratoga National Historical Park	Saratoga Natl. Historical Pk., New York		Middle Ravine
50	SITE OF THE ORIGINAL			Saratoga National Historical Park	Saratoga Natl. Historical Pk., New York		Freeman House Center Of Right Division Of British Army After Battle Of Sept. 19, 1777
51	THE SHOT THAT KILLED			Saratoga National Historical Park	Saratoga Natl. Historical Pk., New York		Gen. Fraser Oct. 7, 1777 Was Fired From Near Here By Timothy Murphy Of Morgan's Riflemen.
52	TO THE EAST			Saratoga National Historical Park	Saratoga Natl. Historical Pk., New York		Burgonyne's Headquarters
53	TO THE NORTH IS BREYMANN			Saratoga National Historical Park	Saratoga Natl. Historical Pk., New York		Redoubt The Westmost Point Of The British Entrenched Camp. Captured By The Americans On Oct. 7 When Arnold Was Severely Wounded
54	BRYAN HOME			Maple Avenue at Rock Street, Saratoga Springs	Saratoga Springs, City Of, New York		Erected 1832 On The Site Of The Log Cabin Inn Of Alexander Bryan Revolutionary Scout
55	BREASTWORKS			In School Yard, Victory Mills	Saratoga, Town Of, New York		Of General Learned
56	BREASTWORKS			On Nys 29 At Schuylerville	Saratoga, Town Of, New York		Of General Burgoyne
57	CAMP OF			On Us 4 S. Of Schuylerville	Saratoga, Town Of, New York		Continental Troops Under General Gates East Across Fish Creek
58	COLONEL MORGAN			On Us 4 At Victory Mills	Saratoga, Town Of, New York		Crossed Creek Here As Assaulted British Camp
59	COLONEL MORGAN			On Nys 338 At Schuylerville	Saratoga, Town Of, New York		Held This Position To Prevent British Retreat To West
60	COLONEL MORGAN			On Nys 29 About 1/2 Mile West Of Schuylerville	Saratoga, Town Of, New York		Held This Position To Prevent British Retreat To West
61	COLONIAL AND			On Us 4 At Schuylerville	Saratoga, Town Of, New York		Revolutionary Fording Place
62	DERIDDER			On Nys 29 At Schuylerville	Saratoga, Town Of, New York		Horse Ferry
63	FIRST BRIDGE			On Nys 29 At Schuylerville	Saratoga, Town Of, New York		Here Bore Stone Tablet Now Buried In Roadway Reading "The Union- It Must Be Preserved. Gen'l Jackson. A.d. 1834"
64	LEARNED, GLOVER			On Us 4 At Victory Mills	Saratoga, Town Of, New York		Nixon Crossed Creek Here To Support Colonel Morgan
65	LINES OCCUPIED BY			On Nys 29 At Schuylerville	Saratoga, Town Of, New York		Burgoyne's German And Canadian Forces
66	ON THESE FIELDS			On Nys 29 At Schuylerville	Saratoga, Town Of, New York		The British Army Grounded Arms At The Surrender
67	POSITION OF			On Us 4 S. Of Schuylerville	Saratoga, Town Of, New York		Fraser's Corps British Light Troops October 10 To 17 1777
68	SITE OF			On Us 4 At Schuylerville	Saratoga, Town Of, New York		Camp Of General Burgoyne Oct. 10 To 17 1777
69	SITE OF			On Nys 29 At Schuylerville	Saratoga, Town Of, New York		Fort Hardy 1757
70	SITE OF			On Nys 29 At Schuylerville	Saratoga, Town Of, New York		Continental Barracks Where General Stark Tried And Condemned The Tory Lovelace As A Spy
71	SITE OF			On Schuylerville-coveville County Road	Saratoga, Town Of, New York		General Gates Headquarters Previous To Surrender Of General Burgoyne Oct. 17, 1777
72	SITE OF			On Schuylerville-coveville County Road	Saratoga, Town Of, New York		Surrender Of General Burgoyne To General Gates October 17, 1777
73	SITE OF			On Schuylerville-coveville County Road	Saratoga, Town Of, New York		Home Of General Schuyler Burned By Burgoyne 1777
74	SITE OF			On Schuylerville-coveville County Road	Saratoga, Town Of, New York		Dovegat House Headquarters General Burgoyne During Advance And Retreat Of British Army
75	SITE OF			On Town Rd., Victory Mills	Saratoga, Town Of, New York		Camp Of General Learned Before Surrender Of General Burgoyne
76	SITE OF			On Us 4 At Schuylerville	Saratoga, Town Of, New York		First Flax And Linen Mill In America Built 1810
77	SITE OF			On Schuylerville-coveville County Road	Saratoga, Town Of, New York		Wheatfields Burned By Catherine Schuyler When American Settlers Fled Before Burgoyne's Advance
78	SITE OF			On Schuylerville-coveville County Road	Saratoga, Town Of, New York		Oldest Cotton Mill In New York State Built 1828
79	SITE OF			On Nys 29 At Schuylerville	Saratoga, Town Of, New York		Camp Of General Burgoyne October 10Th To 17Th 1777
80	TRENCHES			On Us 4 At Victory Mills	Saratoga, Town Of, New York		Of Burgoyne's Army
81	DIRCK SWART HOUSE			On Us 4 At Stillwater	Stillwater, Town Of, New York		Headquarters Aug. 3–14, 1777 Of Gen. Philip Schuyler Arnold Marched From Here To Relief Of Fort Stanwix
82	FERRY LANE			On Us 4 At Stillwater	Stillwater, Town Of, New York		Oct. 1777 Burgoyne's Brunswick Troops Marched Through This Lane To Vandenburgh Ferry And Prison Camp At Campbridge, Mass.
83	HARMANUS SCHUYLER			On Us 4 At Stillwater	Stillwater, Town Of, New York		Mansion Washington, Schuyler And Clinton Were Entertained Here In 1783
84	HISTORIC SITES			On Us 4 At Stillwater	Stillwater, Town Of, New York		Fort Ingoldsby Built 1709 Fort Winslow Built 1756 Montressor's Blockhouse & Storehouse Barracks 1758 Schuyler's Supply Depot 1777
85	ON THE WOODED HILL			On Us 4 At Stillwater	Stillwater, Town Of, New York		To The Left Stand Earthworks Thrown Up By Amer. Army Before Battle Of Saratoga 1777
86	HALFMOON FORT			On Us 4 1 Mile North Of Broad St., Waterford	Waterford, Town Of, New York		1689 Defense Outpost Of Albany Site Of "Ye Halfmoon" Settlement, 1764 On "Great Road" To Canada
87	UP COUNTRY			On Saratoga Ave., Waterford	Waterford, Town Of, New York		Erected 1830 By William Punderson Mansfield. Home Of Lewis W. Mansfield Author Of Up Country Letters, Morning Watch And Country Margins
88	WATER FORD			Near Southeast Corner Of Broad & Second Sts., Waterford	Waterford, Town Of, New York		A Colonial Ford Across The Mohawk River From Which Waterford Derives Its Name
89	WATERFORD			In Flatiron Park, Broad & Sixth Sts., Waterford	Waterford, Town Of, New York		1794 Oldest Continuously Incorporated Village In New York State
90	WATERFORD			In Park, Broad & First Sts. At Waterford	Waterford, Town Of, New York		1794 Oldest Continuously Incorporated Village In New York State
91	WATERFORD			On Us 4 4/5 Mile North Of Broad St., Waterford	Waterford, Town Of, New York		1794 Oldest Continuously Incorporated Village In New York State
92	WHITE HOMESTEAD			On Saratoga Ave., Waterford	Waterford, Town Of, New York		Erected 1830 By Hugh White Who Helped Develop Cohoes Power And Industry; R.r. Builder; Congressman; Brother Of Canvass White, C.e.,
93	BATTLE OF WILTON			On County Rd. About 1/2 Mile West Of Kings Station	Wilton, Town Of, New York		February 17, 1693 British Force Of 250 Whites & 290 Indians Engaged French & Indian Force Of "600 Or 700" Men
94	GRANT COTTAGE			On US 9 At Wilton	Wilton, Town Of, New York		Entrance To Cottage On Mount McGregor Splendid Panorama Known As "Grant's Last View"
95	GRANT COTTAGE			On County Rd. Leading To Cottage On Mt. McGregor	Wilton, Town Of, New York		Entrance To Cottage On Mount McGregor Splendid Panorama Known As "Grant's Last View"
96	GRANT COTTAGE			On Us 9 At Wilton	Wilton, Town Of, New York		Approaching Road On Left To House On Mount McGregor Where Ulysses S. Grant Died July 23, 1885
97	GRANT COTTAGE			Mt McGregor Road	Wilton, Town Of, New York		Approaching Road To House On Mount McGregor Where Ulysses S. Grant Died July 23, 1885
98	ULYSSES S. GRANT			On Lawn In Front Of Cottage On Mount McGregor	Moreau, Town Of, New York		Ulysses S. Grant Lived Here During His Last Days June 16 To July 23, 1885 And Completed His Personal Memoirs
99	FORT'S FERRY			Vischer Ferry Nature & Historic Preserve	Clifton Park, Town Of, New York		Fort's Ferry Site of oldest settlement in Clifton Park. Known as Canastigione, settled 1672. Nicholas Fort established a rope ferry in 1728
100	LOCK 19			Vischer Ferry Nature & Historic Preserve	Clifton Park, Town Of, New York		Lock 19 Double chamber lock for raising-lowering boats. Built 1842 during enlargement of Erie Canal. Far chamber lengthened 1885
101	"THE GUT", OR "THE VALLEY"			Corner Phila and Putnam Streets	Saratoga Springs, City Of, New York		"The Gut", or "The Valley" (circa 1920–1960) In this low-lying neighborhood a lively Jewish enclave of stores, markets, hotels and boarding houses catered to NYC summer visitors here for the healing springs
102	GIDEON PUTNAM BURYING GROUND			South Franklin Street	Saratoga Springs, City Of, New York		Gideon Putnam (1763-1812) early settler and founding father. Developed Saratoga from wilderness to famous spa. Putnam donated this land and was the first to be buried here. The stone wall surrounds the Putnam family plot
103	WORLD WAR MEMORIAL PAVILION			Congress Park	Saratoga Springs, City Of, New York		World War Memorial Pavilion dedicated 1931 by American Legion Aux. Unit 70 Site of the 1882 Congress Spring Victorian bandstand
104	DUBLIN			Grand Ave. at Walworth St.	Saratoga Springs, City Of, New York		Drawn by hotel and railroad work, Irish and then Italian immigrants populated this special neighborhood from the 1840s through the 1890s
105	COL. ELMER ELLSWORTH			Dunning Street east of US Route 9	Malta, Town Of, New York		Col. Elmer Ellsworth born nearby April 11, 1837. Commanded Fire Zouaves. First Union officer to die in Civil War. "Mourned as a son" by Abraham Lincoln.
106	DUNNING STREET COMMON			Dunning Street east of US Route 9	Malta, Town Of, New York		Dunning Street Common given by Michael Dunning. Parade Ground for militia training in the Revolution. Preserved as village green for grazing, horse races and other town festivities
107	PARADE GROUND			Dunning Street east of US Route 9	Malta, Town Of, New York		Donated by Captain Michael Dunning in 1776 for use as a militia training ground during the Revolutionary War. It has since served Malta as a public square.
108	WHITNEY FIELD			Bloomfield Road north of Denton Road	Greenfield, New York		Whitney Field. Built 1901 by W.C. Whitney. Named for son H.P. Whitney, a ten-goal polo player. Abandoned to farmland 1934. Found and rebuilt 1978–79.
109	CEMETERY, 1864			Ushers & Longkill Rds.	Jonesville, New York		Cemetery, 1864. Rolling hills winding paths and sculpted monuments reflect the rural cemetery movement popular in mid 19th century America.
110	REXFORD HOUSE			South West corner of Balltown and Riverview Roads	Clifton Park, New York	42°51′21.6″N 73°53′19.9″W)	Edward Rexford from England settled here c.1763. Early home enlarged by Cyrus Rexford in 1883.
111	KINGSLEY INN			NW corner of Kingsley Road at Lake Hill Road	Burnt Hills, New York	42°54′36.6″N 73°53′43.6″W)	Established 1795 by William Kingsley Tavern on stagecoach route halfway between Ballston Spa and Schenectady
112	BETTYS FAMILY			SE corner of Hillside Cemetery, Burnt Hills NY	Burnt Hills, New York		Joseph died 1804 and Abigail died 1791, local innkeepers and unfortunate parents of Joseph, convicted traitor & spy who was hung in 1782
113	BURNT HILLS BAPTIST CHURCH			Kingsley Road south of Lakehill Road	Burnt Hills, New York		Founded 1783. Present church built 1839. Hillside Cemetery adjoining. 1st burial 1782.
114	CALVARY			Lake Hill Road east of Kingsley Road	Burnt Hills, New York		Episcopal church founded by Dr. Edward Davis May 7, 1849. First service in this building was Christmas Eve, 1849
115	BIRTHPLACE			NW corner Washington and Fenwick Sts.	Ballston, Town Of, New York		Major-Gen Abner Doubleday Ballston Spa June 26, 1819 Founder of baseball 1839 A Civil War hero at Battle of Gettysburg 1863
116	MILTON CENTRE			Middle Line Road, Milton, New York	Milton, Town Of, New York		Early businesses from c.1780 to late 1800s. Gordon grist mill; Rugg wheel shop; Frink-Kellog store; S.Rugg tannery; Freelander blacksmith shop & hotel; Thompson law office
117	MILTON HILL			Middle Line Road, Milton, New York	Milton, Town Of, New York		Area of town first settled c.1772 by David Wood family. Powell's store, Episcopal & Presbyterian churches until c.1850; School #3 to 1950s
118	ROSE HILL WATER TOWER			Middle Line Road, Milton, New York	Milton, Town Of, New York		Square, triple-walled structure built about 1917 to store and supply running water to Thompson farm and area. Used until 1970s
119	CRESCENT AQUEDUCT			On north Bank Of Mohawk Near Us 9 At Crescent	Halfmoon, Town Of, New York		These stone remnants mark the northern end of the aqueduct which carried the Erie Canal over the Mohawk River between 1825 and 1915
120	SITE OF			Middle Line Road	Ballston, Town Of, New York		First court house and jail of Saratoga County. Erected 1796. Destroyed by fire, 1816
121	HOME OF			Middle Line Road	Ballston, Town Of, New York		Jonathan Filer. Partially burned in Ballston invasion of 1780. Braided Indian torch found here. Family escaped and hid nearby
122	1780 INVASION			Middle Line Road	Ballston, Town Of, New York		Home of Tyrannis Collins militia capt. under Gordon raided by British & Indians north of here all rebel men captured & houses burned
123	SAMUEL DAVIS MD.			Middle Line Road	Ballston, Town Of, New York		Born 1765 - died 1840 practiced medicine from here for 50 years. House was a station on the underground railroad
124	BALLSTON CENTER			Middle Line Road	Ballston, Town Of, New York		Samuel Southard Tavern - early graveyard - post office - blacksmith shop - stores - George Washington rode through in 1783
125	COUNTY SEAT				Ballston Spa, New York		The county seat moved from Ballston Center to Ballston Spa in 1817. This county complex was dedicated on 9/21/1968.
126	EMERSON's TAVERN			Ballard Road at Northern Pines Rd	Wilton, Town Of, New York		Emerson's Tavern 1790-1981 site of the first Town of Wilton meeting held Mar. 1819. First Supervisor elected was Dudley Emerson. Gen. Lafayette stayed here.
127	HERE IN 1800			Iron Spring Park, Front St. Ballston Spa (west side)	Ballston, Town Of, New York		A bathing green, bath house and mineral spring were used by visitors from six boarding houses and five private summer homes
128	HERE IN 1900			Iron Spring Park, Front St. Ballston Spa (east side)^{[1]}	Ballston, Town Of, New York		Shoppers going to Front Street and workers walking through the tunnel from factories relaxed at a refreshment stand in the springhouse
129	PINE GROVE			West side of Broadway at Ellsworth Jones Place	Saratoga Springs, City Of, New York		Site of the Walworth home 1823–1952 and was home to Ellen Hardin Walworth, one of four founders of the National Society DAR 1890
130	McCREA HILL			East side of NYS Route 50 at McCrea Hill Rd.	Ballston, Town Of, New York	42.966818°N 73.863369°W	Brothers James, Sam, and Wm. McCrea built near here 1771 James and Sam fought for Rev. War. Wm sided with British. Sister Jane martyred 1777.
131	STEPHEN WHITE			West side of NYS Route 50 north of Burnt Hills	Ballston, Town Of, New York		settled here-1771. Served as Cpt. in militia. taken by British. Wife Phebe was town midwife. House was social center. He died 1793
132	DR. ORRA PHELPS			East side of Parkhurst Road	Wilton, Town Of, New York		1895–1896 Dr. Phelps servet the school system and the Navy and Veterans Hospital. Botanist, ADK 46er, author, naturalist and teacher
133	MALTA DRIVE-IN SIGNS			East side of US Route 9 north of Malta Corners	Malta, Town Of, New York	43.004195°N 73.790302°W)	Open-air theater started in 1949 by Sarto and Leona Smaldone, drive-in purchased in 1988 by brothers Ed and Tom Caro. In operation for over 50 years
134	MALTA RIDGE			SE corner of US Route 9 at Malta Ave. Ext.	Malta, Town Of, New York	43.011350°N 73.789513°W)	Settled well before 1800. Nearby stood Dean Chase's Tavern, well-known landmark and stage coach stop. The ME church was built in 1814.
135	MALTA RIDGE CEMETERY			West side of US Route 9 at Saratoga Bridges Rd.	Malta, Town Of, New York	43.016402°N 73.790764°W)	Earliest recorded grave 1805. Some early family graves are Arnold, Baker, Brown, Chase, Crouch, Fish, Hill, Ireland, Millard, Phillips, Ramsdale, Reno, Riley, Rowley, Wiggins.
136	WIGGINS - COLLAMER			NW corner of US Route 9 and E. High Street	Malta, Town Of, New York	42.994465°N 73.791075°W)	Home of George Wiggins. Land, 1821, house c.1835 150 years in one family. Given Town of Malta 1972 by Nelson P. Collamer. Great, great-grandson.
137	BIRTHPLACE OF			North side of Charlton Rd. at Valentine Rd.	Charlton, New York	42.935742°N 73.944757°W)	Birthplace of John W. Taylor Mar. 1784 - Sept. 1854 twice speaker - U.S. House of Representatives N.Y. Senator - Assemblyman
138	CRUM'S PLACE			North side of county road 63 east of US Route 9	Malta, Town Of, New York	43.0144423°N 73.7762799°W)	George "Crum" Speck, chef, inventor of the potato chip ran his restaurant 1882–1890. Nationally known and local patrons dined here.
139	THE CHARLTON SCHOOL			North side of Lake Hill Rd.	Charlton, New York	42.9144966°N 73.9326251°W)	Founded 1895 by John S. Hawley as the Charlton Farm School for Troubled Boys burned April 2, 1938 rebuilt for young women in 1955
140	PRESBYTERIAN CHURCH			North side of Charlton Rd. in Charlton village	Charlton, New York	42.9338313°N 73.9657496°W)	organized January 3, 1786 by settlers from Freehold Monmouth Co. New Jersey present edifice built 1852 - 53.
141	CHARLTON ACADEMY			North side of Charlton Rd. in Charlton village	Charlton, New York		founded 1859, by Rev. James Crocker, destroyed by fire April 1946
142	CHARLTON MUSEUM			East side of Maple Ave. in Charlton village	Charlton, New York	42.9348992°N 73.9602312°W)	St. Paul's Episcopal Church built 1804 Dist. #8 school 1859-1948 Charlton Historical Society first meeting-Jan. 17, 1966
143	E.HUBBELL 1831			Brookline Road east of NYS Route 50	Ballston, Town Of, New York	42.977372°N 73.851065°W	Late Federal Style home of Edmond and Mary Hubbell. Mr.Hubbell operated a woolen cloth manufactory on the Mourning Kill until ca.1850
144	TRIP-HAMMER			Brookline Road east of NYS Route 50	Ballston, Town Of, New York	42.977372°N 73.851065°W	Site of water-powered forge shop and residence of Sylvester Blood.(1785-1866) and wife, Loretta. Shop made scythes and axes until 1825.
145	MARVIN HOMESTEAD			NYS Route 67 west of I-87	Malta, Town Of, New York	42.9691038°N 73.8172231°W	Home of William Marvin and Susanna (Wright) Marvin, his wife. Pioneer settlers in Town of Malts. Land purchased April 2, 1772. House built ca.1790.
146	EAST LINE			NYS Route 67 at East Line Road	Malta, Town Of, New York	42.971297°N 73.830831°W}	An early community ca. 1780 shared by Malta and Ballston townships. ME. Church built 1809. Nearby was a hotel, a tavern, by 1837 a R.R. stop
147	SOUTH CORINTH			Chapman St. at Miner Rd.	Corinth, New York	43.1964447°N 73.8668746°W}	Early businesses - from 1800 saw mills, Chapman clothiery, Powell tannery, Rugg tannery, Prentiss bolt & nut factory, blacksmiths, Owen wagon shop
148	STEVENS SCHOOL			Lake Hill Road east of Kingsley Road	Ballston, Town Of, New York	42.9107466°N 73.8823316°W}	Built in 1916 for Burnt Hills Ballston Lake 1st consolidated and 2nd centralized district in New York State
149	COL. ELMER E. ELLSWORTH			East side of US Rte 9 North of Dunning St	Malta, Town Of, New York	42.973056°N 73.792127°W}	1837-1861 Site of Childhood home First Union officer killed in the Civil War
150	LUTHER FOREST			SE Corner of Dunning St and Fox Wander West	Malta, Town Of, New York	42.971674°N 73.785026°W}	A 7,000 acre forest preserve created by the Luther family 10,000,000 trees planted between 1898 and 1937
151	SITE OF SMITH-CALDWELL-VAN AERNEM HOME			West side of Medical Park Drive	Malta, Town Of, New York	42.971967°N 73.806438°W}	circa 1830 vernacular Federal Style farm house contained hidden passageways characteristic of the underground railroad
152	TURNPIKE			West side of Plank Road N. of Maxwell Dr	Clifton Park, New York	42.871071°N 73.781284°W}	Route of Saratoga Turnpike from Waterford to Ballston and Saratoga c.1829.A private toll road paved with wood planks in 1849.

== See also ==
- List of New York State Historic Markers
- National Register of Historic Places listings in New York
- List of National Historic Landmarks in New York

== Notes ==
1. ^{a} Unusually, this marker has different text on each side.
