= Great Redoubt =

Coordinates: 43°0′14.4″N 73°36′33.3″W

The Great Redoubt is located in Saratoga National Historical Park in Saratoga, New York, United States.
