= Bullard Block =

Bullard Block may mean:

- Bullard Block (Los Angeles)
- Bullard Block (Schuylerville, New York)
