= Prospect Hill Cemetery (Schuylerville, New York) =

Historic site in Saratoga County, New York, US

- Interactive map of Prospect Hill Cemetery

Details
- Established: 1865
- Location: Schuylerville, New York
- Country: United States
- Coordinates: 43°05′53″N 73°35′38″W
- Type: Public

Prospect Hill Cemetery is a cemetery in Schuylerville, New York opened in 1865.

== About ==
Founded in 1865, the cemetery is situated next to the towering Saratoga Monument. The cemetery abuts the Victory Woods trail.

=== Notable monuments ===
The cemetery includes the Soldier Monument, a monument dedicated to Company K of the 77th Regiment of the civil war. The first ten men to join Company K received a bounty of ten dollars apiece. The company's chosen captain, John R. Rockwell, was the editor of the Saratoga American. This company consisted of three-fourths of the 340 soldiers who marched from Saratoga to fight for the Union.
