= Schuylerville, New York =

Schuylerville
- Village
- Village of Schuylerville
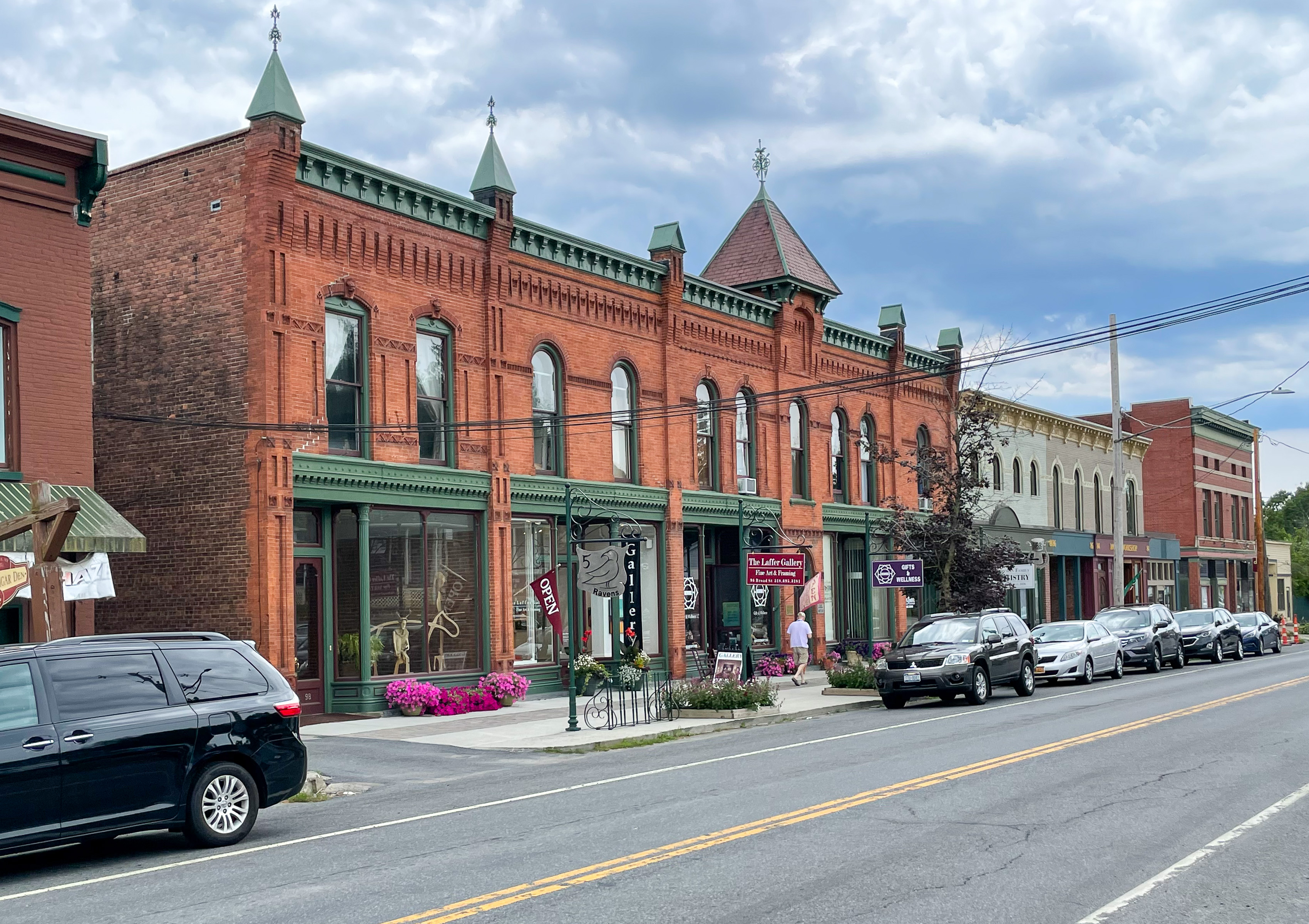
- Bullard Block and Broad Street

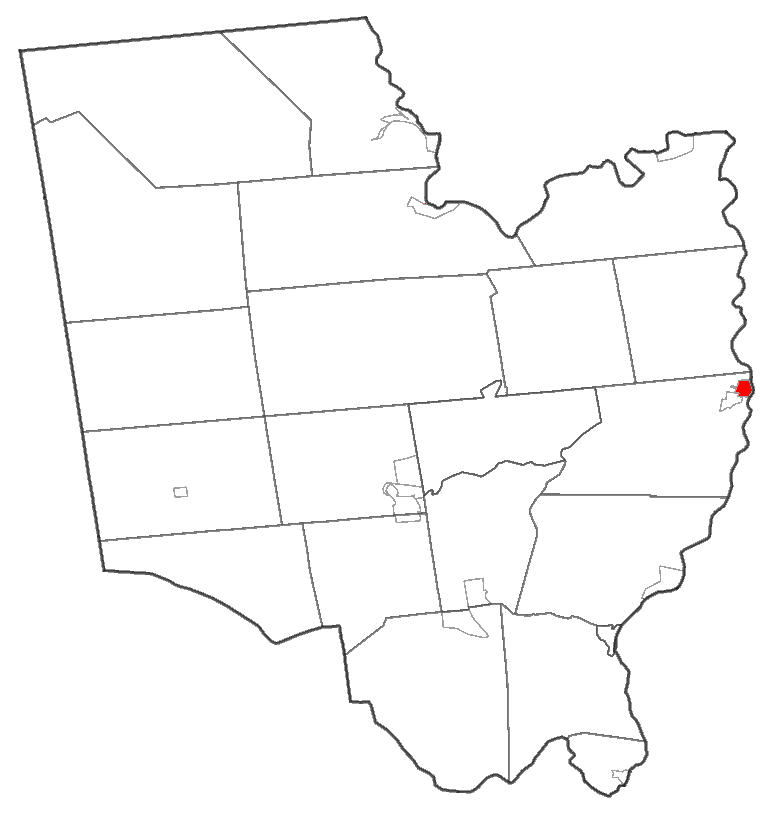
- Map highlighting Schuylerville's location within Saratoga County.

- Location within the state of New York Schuylerville (the United States)
- Coordinates: 43°6′3″N 73°34′53″W
- Country: United States
- State: New York
- County: Saratoga
- Named for: Schuyler family

Area
  - Total: 0.59 sq mi (1.52 km^{2})
  - Land: 0.53 sq mi (1.38 km^{2})
  - Water: 0.054 sq mi (0.14 km^{2})
- Elevation: 128 ft (39 m)

Population (2020)
  - Total: 1,370
  - Density: 2,570.3/sq mi (992.39/km^{2})
- Time zone: UTC-5 (Eastern (EST))
  - Summer (DST): UTC-4 (EDT)
- ZIP code: 12871
- Area code: 518
- FIPS code: 36-65750
- GNIS feature ID: 0964639
- Website: www.villageofschuylerville.org

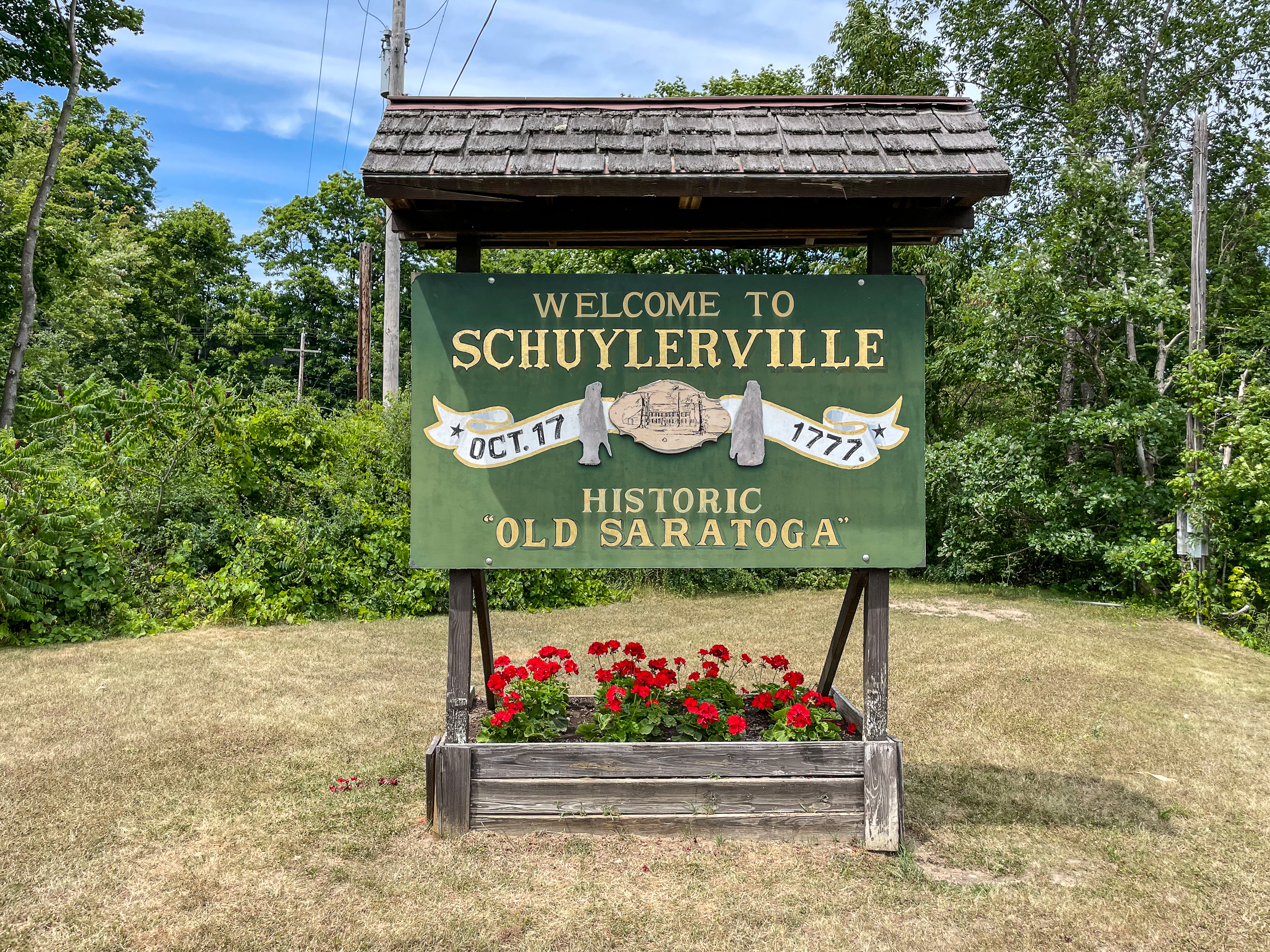
Welcome sign

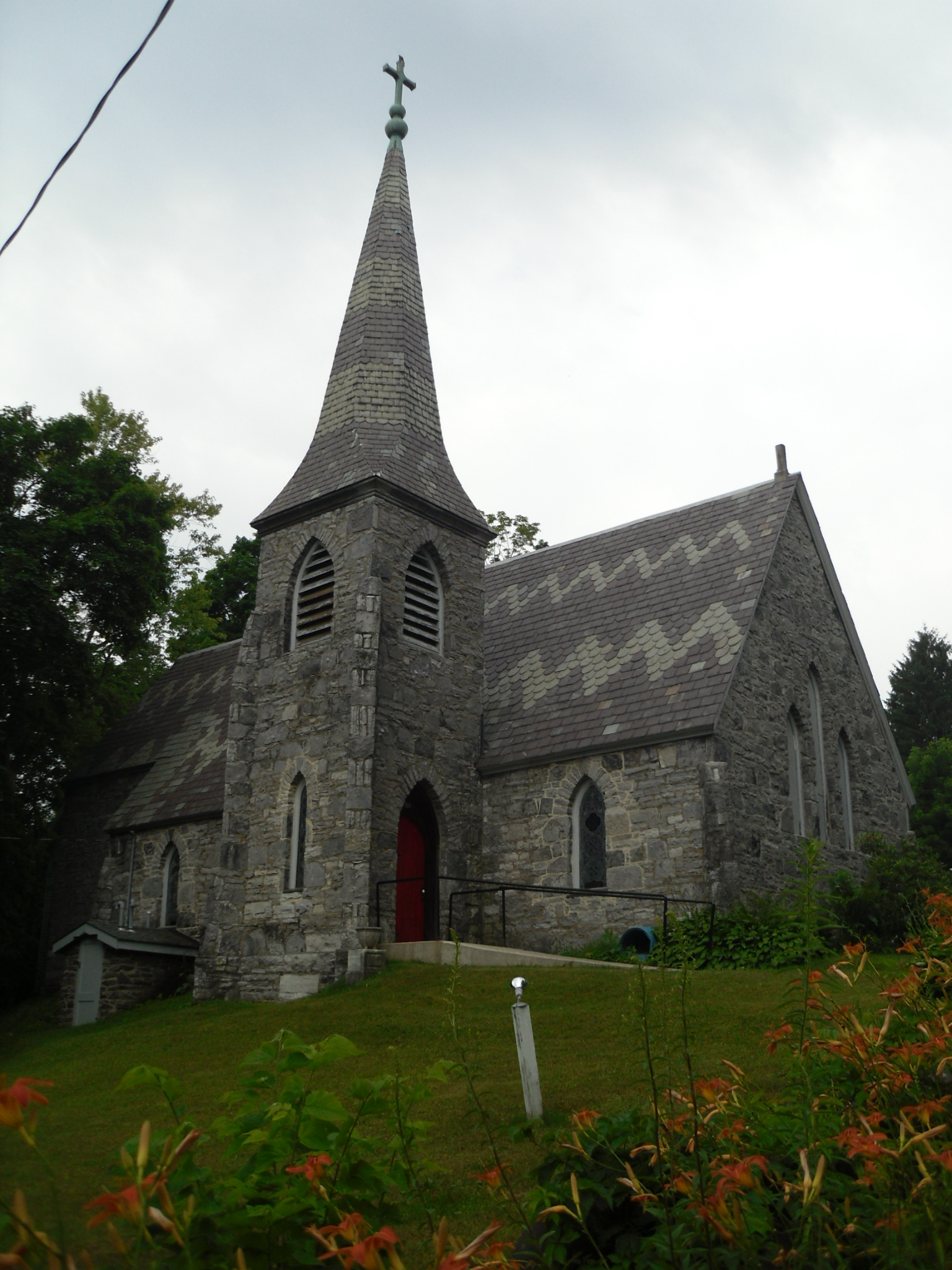
St. Stephen's Episcopal Church

Schuylerville (/ˈskaɪlərˌvɪl/) is a village in Saratoga County, New York, United States. The village is located in the northeastern part of the Town of Saratoga, east of Saratoga Springs. It is part of the Capital Region of New York. The Village of Victory is adjacent to Schuylerville to the southwest and the Hudson River forms the village's eastern border. The population was 1,370 at the 2020 census. The village was incorporated in 1831 and is named after the Schuyler family, a prominent family of Dutch descent in colonial America.

Schuylerville was the site of the surrender of the British Army under General John Burgoyne, following the Battles of Saratoga (1777) in the nearby town of Stillwater. Schuylerville contains several historic buildings, including the General Schuyler House, part of the Saratoga National Historical Park, and Old Saratoga Reformed Church. The schools of the Schuylerville Central School District are located in the village, as are the offices of the Town of Saratoga. The village is served by a public library, Fort Hardy Park, a visitor center, Schuyler Hose Company volunteer fire department and several churches. Village government consists of a mayor and four trustees.

Nearby cultural attractions include the Saratoga Performing Arts Center, Saratoga Race Course, Saratoga National Historical Park and Glens Falls Civic Center. Skidmore College, SUNY Empire State College and Adirondack Community College are also nearby.

== History ==
Inhabited by Native Americans as late as 820 A.D., the region was eventually settled by Dutch settlers from Albany in 1691, who called the region Fort Saratoga. These settlers included the influential Schuyler family. Conflicts occurred among the French, Mohawk, Mohican, Dutch, and English peoples. The peace of 1763 between France and England resulted in this area being available for settlement. Homes and mills were built by European Americans, including General Phillip Schuyler's flax mill in 1767 (the first of its kind in the American colonies).

The community that developed near the fort was originally called "Saratoga", but was partly destroyed by the French and their Native allies in 1745 during King George's War. The Old Saratoga Reformed Church was organized in 1770. It was used as a hospital during the Revolutionary War.

=== Revolutionary War ===
In 1777, the British Army under General Burgoyne crossed the Hudson River, one-half mile north of Schuylerville (known then as Saratoga) on their campaign from Canada to Albany in an attempt to end the American Revolution by splitting the colonies in two. The British marched south approximately nine miles to Bemis Heights, near present-day Stillwater, where American troops engaged them in the two Battles of Saratoga, the first on September 19 and the second on October 7, 1777. The British advance was stopped by the American forces, and the British retreated back northward to an encampment along Fish Creek, just outside the village. The Saratoga Battle Monument in the Village of Victory is located near the site of the British encampment.

American forces blocked further British retreat and surrounded the encampment. With winter approaching and no hope of escape, the British were forced to surrender. On October 17, 1777, General Burgoyne surrendered his army to American General Horatio Gates, marking the turning point of the American Revolution. The British laid down their arms in what is now Fort Hardy Park in the Village of Schuylerville. The American victory at Saratoga was enough to convince France to throw their support to the American cause, and Spain eventually followed France's lead.

=== Historic sites ===
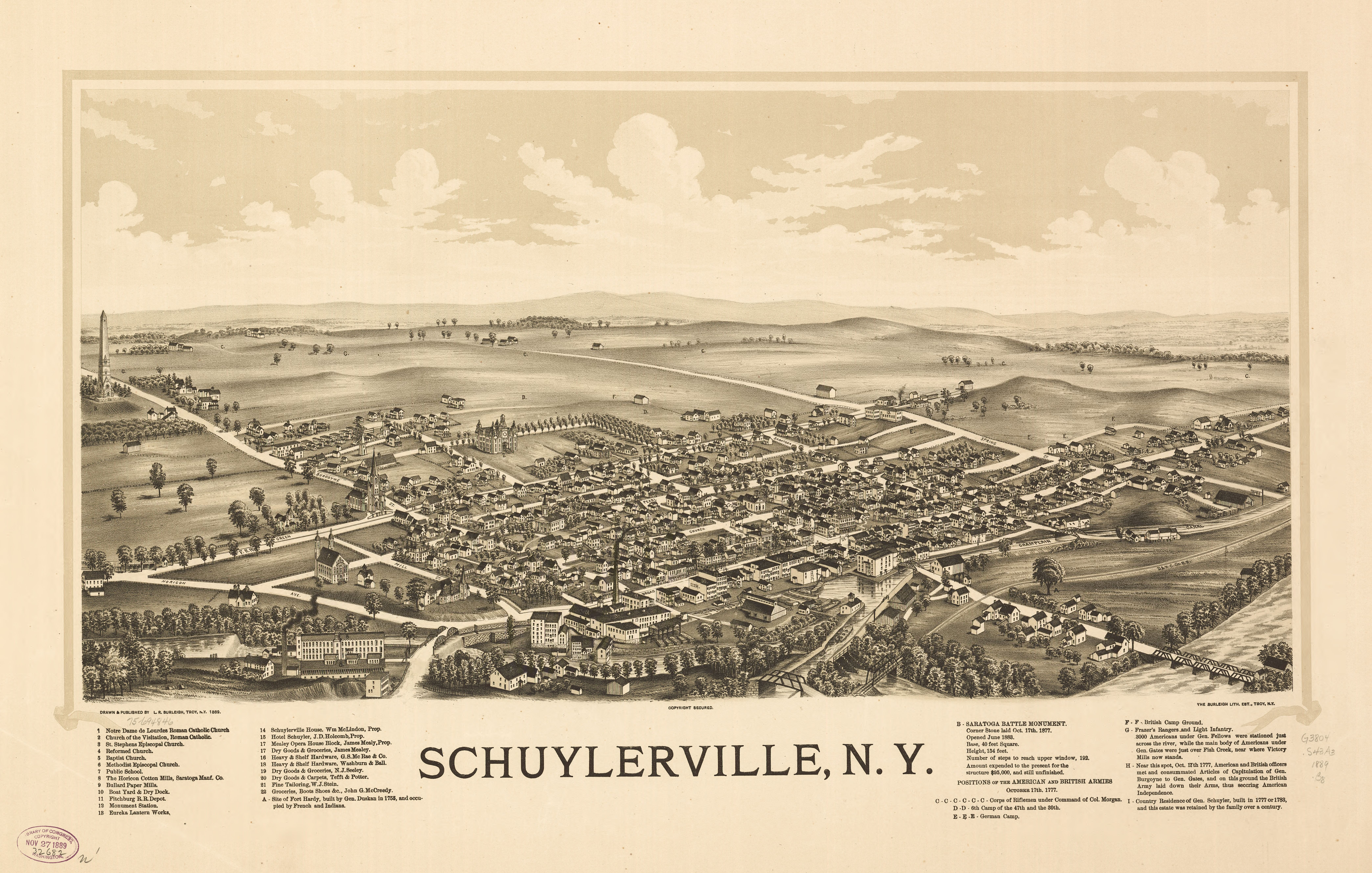
Lithograph of Schuylerville from 1889 by L.R. Burleigh including list of landmarks

The Schuyler House, the Bullard Block, Old Saratoga Reformed Church, and St. Stephen's Episcopal Church are listed on the National Register of Historic Places. The Marshall House is listed as a significant Revolutionary War historic site and is the sole surviving building from the time of the Battles of Saratoga. Situated next to the towering Saratoga Monument, the Prospect Hill Cemetery opened in 1865.

The Marshall House lies one mile north of the village center on US Highway 4 and NY Highway 32. It was made famous by the publication of Baroness Frederika Riedesel's Letters and Journals relating to the War of the American Revolution and the Capture of the German Troops at Saratoga.

This house was built in 1770–1773. During the closing days of the Battles of Saratoga, Baroness Riedesel with her three infant daughters sheltered there, together with the wives of British army officers and wounded personnel. Her account of the travails of those around her, her keen insight into the personalities of the principal officers of both the British and American armies, and her devotion to her husband in peril have led some commentators to name her as the first woman war correspondent.

The Marshall House was bombarded by the Americans, who assumed it to be an enemy headquarters. Within are conserved cannonballs and other reminders of the ordeal suffered by those who took refuge there. The stone cellar, made famous by the baroness, is largely unchanged. The Marshall House is the sole remaining witness building to the Battles of Saratoga. The owners welcome visitors by appointment.

== Geography ==
According to the United States Census Bureau, the village has a total area of 0.6 square miles (1.6 km^{2}), of which 0.5 square miles (1.3 km^{2}) is land and 0.1 square miles (0.26 km^{2}) (10.34%) is water.

The village is on the west bank of the Hudson River, which defines the county line of Washington County.

U.S. Route 4 and NY Route 29 intersect in the community. NY Route 32 is conjoined with US-4 in the village.

== Demographics ==
Historical population
Census	Pop.	Note	%±
1860	1,348		—
1870	1,367		1.4%
1880	1,617		18.3%
1890	1,387		−14.2%
1900	1,601		15.4%
1910	1,614		0.8%
1920	1,625		0.7%
1930	1,411		−13.2%
1940	1,447		2.6%
1950	1,314		−9.2%
1960	1,361		3.6%
1970	1,402		3.0%
1980	1,256		−10.4%
1990	1,364		8.6%
2000	1,197		−12.2%
2010	1,386		15.8%
2020	1,470		6.1%
U.S. Decennial Census

As of the census of 2010, 1,386 people, 593 households, and 356 families were residing in the village. The population density was 2,622.5 inhabitants per square mile (1,012.6/km^{2}). The 663 housing units averaged 1,254.5 per square mile (484.3/km^{2}). The racial makeup of the village was 96.4% White, 1.2% African American, 0.9% from other races, and 0.9% from two or more races. Hispanics or Latinos of any race were 3.3% of the population.

Of the 593 households, 30.4% had children under the age of 18 living with them, 38.8% were married couples living together, 16.7% had a female householder with no husband present, and 40% were not families. About 32.7% of all households were made up of individuals, and 11.8% had someone living alone who was 65 years of age or older. The average household size was 2.31, and the average family size was 2.91.

In the village, the population was distributed as 25.1% under the age of 20, 22.7% from 20 to 34, 22.2% from 35 to 49, 16.6% from 50 to 64, and 13.3% who were 65 years of age or older. The median age was 37.1 years.

According to the 2009-2013 American Community Survey Five-year Estimates, the median income for a household in the village was $85,284, and the median income for a family was $97,768. Males had a median income of $70,625 versus $52,629 for females. The per capita income for the village was $44,157. About 1.8% of families and 12% of the population were below the poverty line, including 4.4% of those under age 18 and 8.9% of those age 65 or over.

In the March 25, 1990, issue of The New York Times, writer James Howard Kunstler published a piece entitled "Schuylerville Stands Still". He portrayed Schuylerville as an example of rural "rot and disrepair", citing unemployment, broken sidewalks, and dented cans at Mini Mart, a local mini market. Residents reacted negatively to his feature. Kunstler also used Schuylerville as an example of a town in decline in a chapter titled "The loss of community" in his 1993 book, The Geography of Nowhere.

== Environmental concerns ==
Since the late 20th century, much debate has arisen about dredging the Hudson River in the area bordering the east side of the Village of Schuylerville. The General Electric (GE) transformer plant dumped PCBs upstream in Hudson Falls from 1947 to 1977. GE and the United States Environmental Protection Agency have come to an agreement in which GE is responsible for dredging a 40-mile (64 km) stretch of the river. The first part of the dredging will end in Schuylerville.

In a press release from the EPA dated February 8, 2007, the EPA announced that the dredging would not start until 2009 because of various project complications. The debate over dredging the Hudson River created tension within the community from the mid- to late 1990s to about 2003. The debate was heated for some time, with some residents skeptical as to whether dredging will make the problem better or worse. This is said to be the largest Superfund project in the United States.

== Notable person ==
- Elise Stefanik, U.S. representative

== See also ==
- Gerald B. H. Solomon Saratoga National Cemetery
- The Witch of Saratoga, local legend of a woman who was abandoned after the British defeat at Schuylerville and who would go on to haunt the vicinity.
