= Saratoga Battle Monument =

US historical monument

Coordinates: 43°05′55″N 73°35′36″W

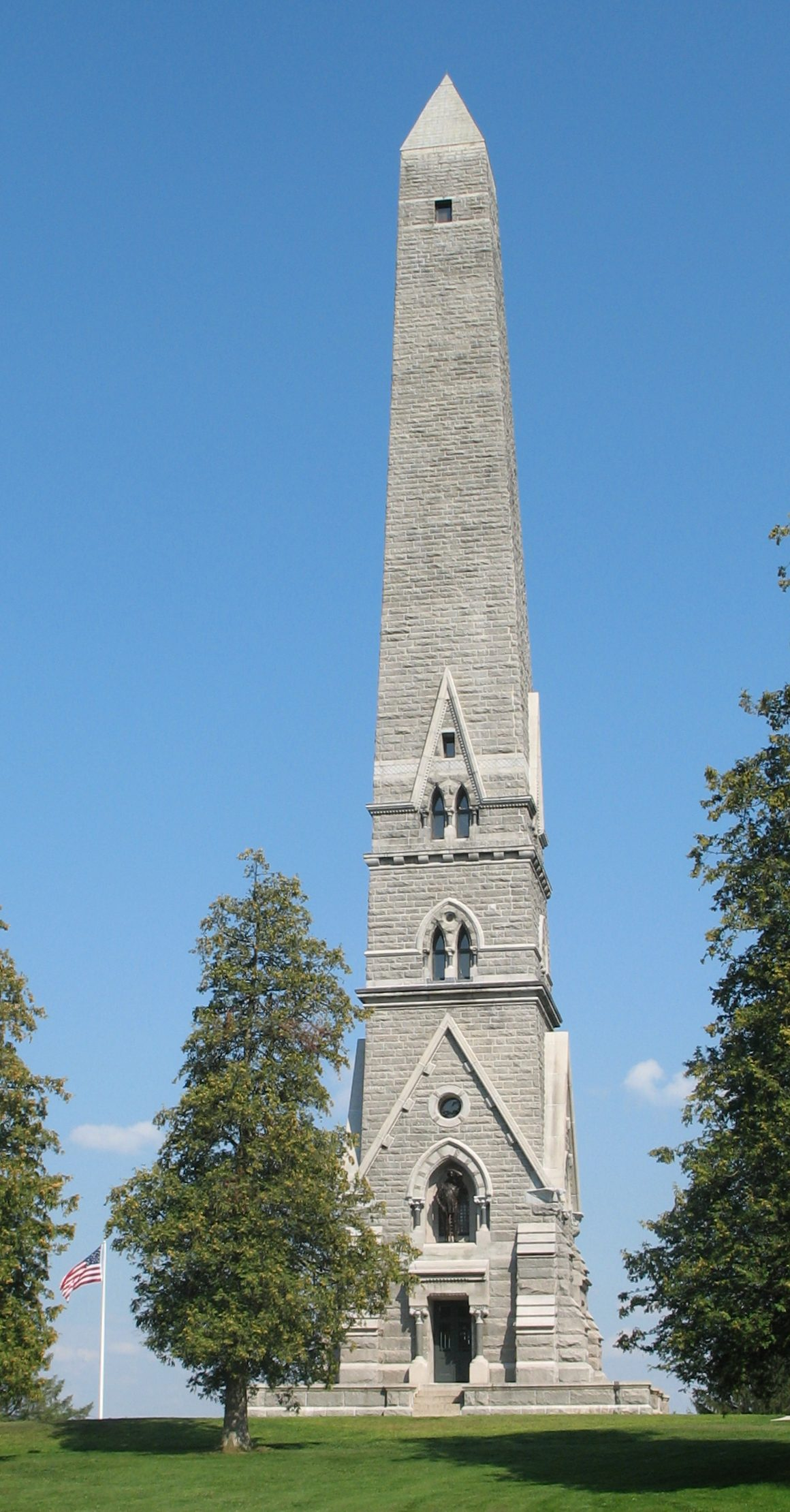
The Saratoga Monument of 1883 commemorates the surrender of the British General Burgoyne to American General Gates in 1777

The Saratoga Battle Monument is a 155-foot (47 m) granite obelisk located in the village of Victory, Saratoga County, New York. The monument commemorates what is called the "Turning Point" of the American Revolution—the surrender of British forces led by General John Burgoyne to the Americans under General Horatio Gates during the Battles of Saratoga. Today the monument is part of Saratoga National Historical Park.

== Description ==
[T]he Monument is situated on a high bluff upon the grounds of Burgoyne’s last camp and overlooks the scenic Hudson Valley.

Within the Monument are 188 steps that connect five levels and a viewing platform at the top. Upon the walls of the first two levels are 16 bronze bas relief plaques depicting dramatized scenes of the American Revolution. Other interior decorative items include ornamental ceramic tile, brass moldings, stained glass and terracotta cornices.

The Saratoga Battle Monument contains four niches intended for life size bronze statues of the American commanders associated with the Battle of Saratoga.

Facing north is General Horatio Gates, who had overall command of the American army in the battles. He gazes northward, anticipating the imminent arrival of the southward-invading British army.

Facing east, above the golden text, is American General Philip Schuyler. His country estate is downhill and east of here. It was burned by the British as they were retreating north from the battlefield.

The empty niche, facing south toward the battlefield, pointedly has no statue. For many visitors, it evokes the memory of an American General who led heroically in combat at Saratoga but later placed himself outside any niche of honor, Benedict Arnold.

Facing west is the bronze statue of American Colonel Daniel Morgan, whose riflemen and light infantry troops were positioned west of here to prevent the British from escaping in that direction.

== Saratoga Monument Association ==
On 17 October 1856, a group met at the General Schuyler House in Schuylerville, New York to discuss creation of a monument to celebrate the American victory at the Battle of Saratoga. In 1859, the Saratoga Monument Association was organized, with a board of fourteen permanent directors: George Strover, William Wilcox, Henry Holmes, James M. Marvin, John A. Corey, James M. Cook, Leroy Mowry, Asa C. Tefft, Peter Gansevoort, Hamilton Fish, Phillip Schuyler, George W. Blecker, and Horatio Seymour. Hamilton Fish was elected first president. The association was incorporated by New York State in 1859. The trustees got as far as choosing the location for the monument before the Civil War intervened. The effort to build the monument was resumed in 1872. In 1874, the New York State Legislature approved an appropriation of $50,000 for construction of the monument. The association asked each of the thirteen original states to pledge $5,000 each, but only Rhode Island replied with a conditional offer.

== Cornerstone ==
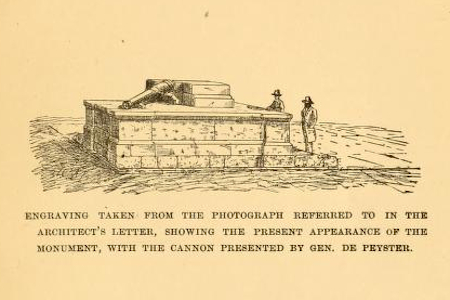
Saratoga Battle Monument under construction in 1877

On 17 October 1877, 100 years to the day after Burgoyne's surrender, the cornerstone of the monument was laid with great pageantry, including a parade two miles long to the site, music, speeches and the reading of Fitz-Greene Halleck's "The Field of Grounded Arms":

...
And such were Saratoga’s victors—such
The Yeomen-Brave, whose deeds and death have given
A glory to her skies,
A music to her name.

In honorable life her fields they trod,
In honorable death they sleep below;
Their sons’ proud feelings here
Their noblest monuments.

== Construction ==
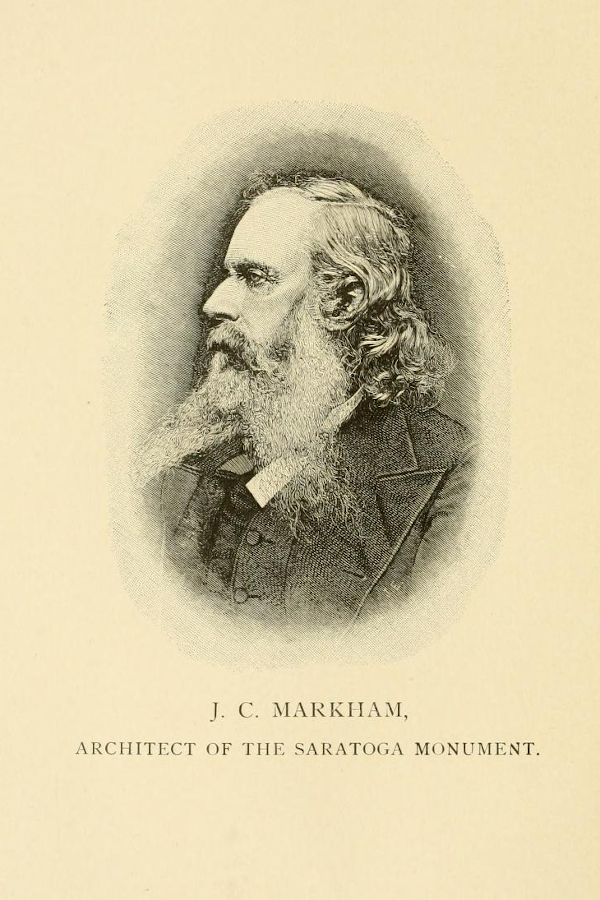
John C. Markham, designer of the Monument

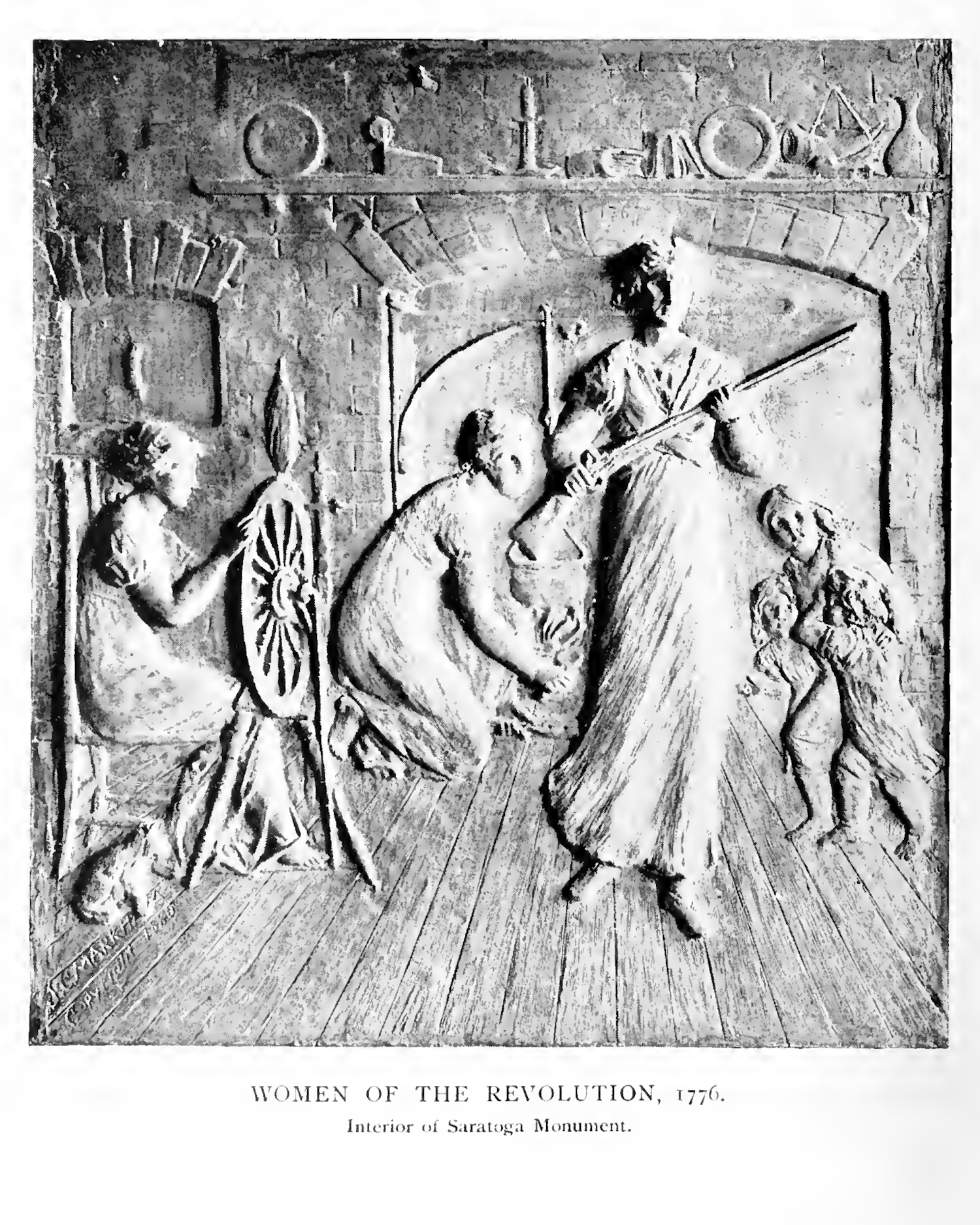
Plaque: Women of the Revolution

The monument was designed by John C. Markham of New Jersey. The capstone was placed on 3 November 1882, and the bronze statues were completed in August 1887. The statues were designed by George Bissell (Gates), Alexander Doyle (Schuyler), and William O'Donovan (Morgan). Markham designed the sixteen bronze bas-relief plaques that line the interior of the first floor.

The monument was formally dedicated and turned over to the State of New York on 18 October 1912. In 1980, the state transferred the monument to the US National Park Service.

== Funding ==
Final funding for the Saratoga Battle Monument consisted of $2,300 from private donations, $95,000 from the federal government, and $10,000 from New York State. Much of the labor and material was donated. In 1895, when the monument was transferred to New York State, a debt of $4,500 remained.

== Renovations ==
By 1987, the monument had deteriorated such that it had to be closed due to safety concerns. A renovation was undertaken at a cost of $3 million, and the monument was reopened on Columbus Day, 2005. Funding was provided by the National Park Service thanks to the efforts of Congressman Gerald Solomon.

== See also ==
- Bennington Battle Monument
- Boot Monument
