= Old Saratoga Reformed Church =

Historic church in New York, United States

- Saratoga Reformed Church, Old
- U.S. National Register of Historic Places
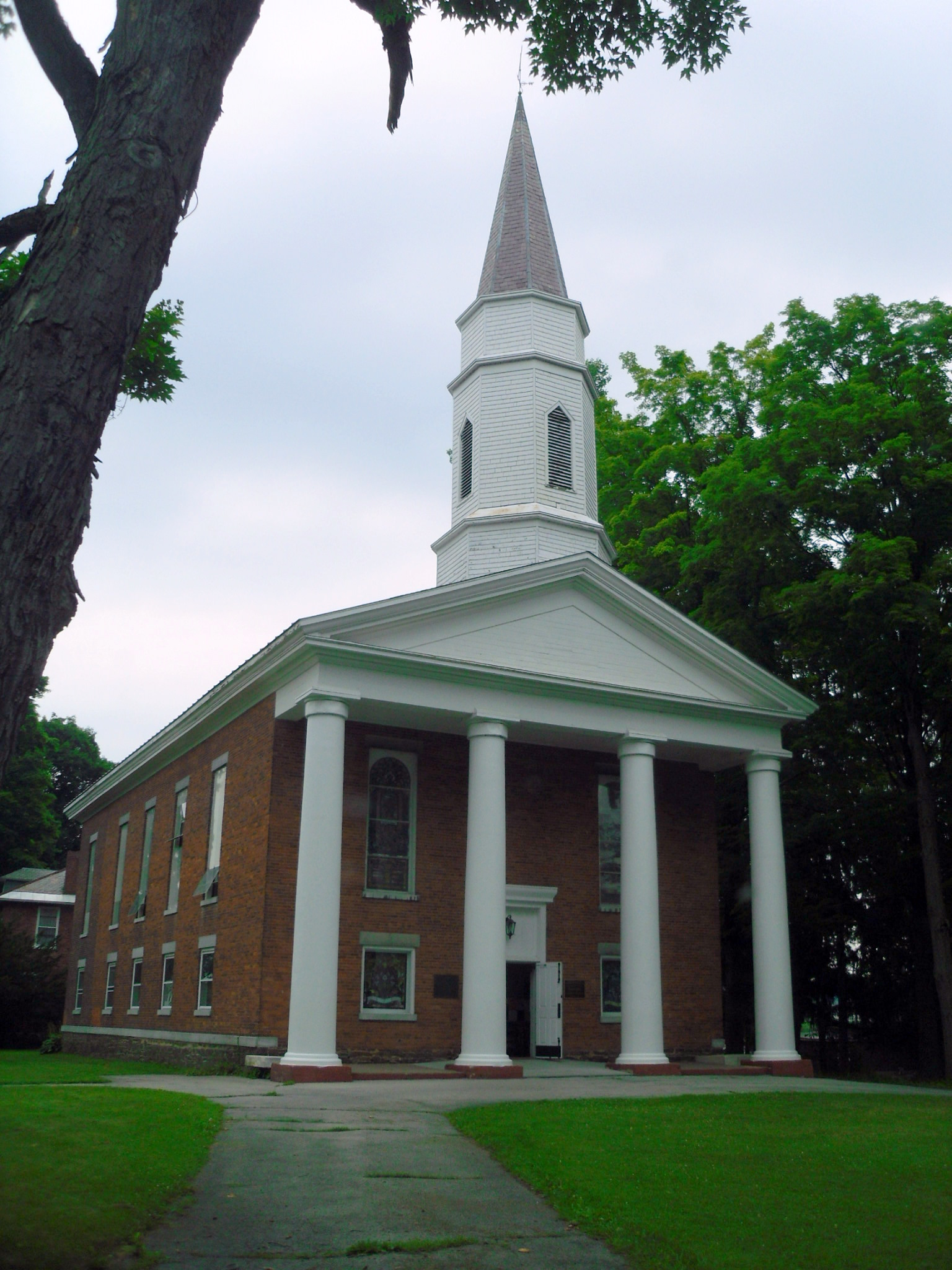
- Old Saratoga Reformed Church, June 2010

- Location within New York Location within the United States
- Location: Jct. of Burgoyne and Pearl Sts., Schuylerville, New York
- Coordinates: 43°5′54″N 73°35′5″W
- Area: 1.3 acres (0.53 ha)
- Built: 1857
- Architectural style: Greek Revival
- NRHP reference No.: 97001387
- Added to NRHP: November 7, 1997

Old Saratoga Reformed Church is a historic building at the junction of Burgoyne and Pearl Streets in Schuylerville, Saratoga County, New York. It is part of the Reformed Church in America and was built in 1857 in the Greek Revival style. It was listed on the National Register of Historic Places in 1997.

The Old Saratoga Reformed Church was organized in 1770, and was used as a hospital during the Revolutionary War.
