= St. Stephen's Episcopal Church (Schuylerville, New York) =

Historic church in New York, United States

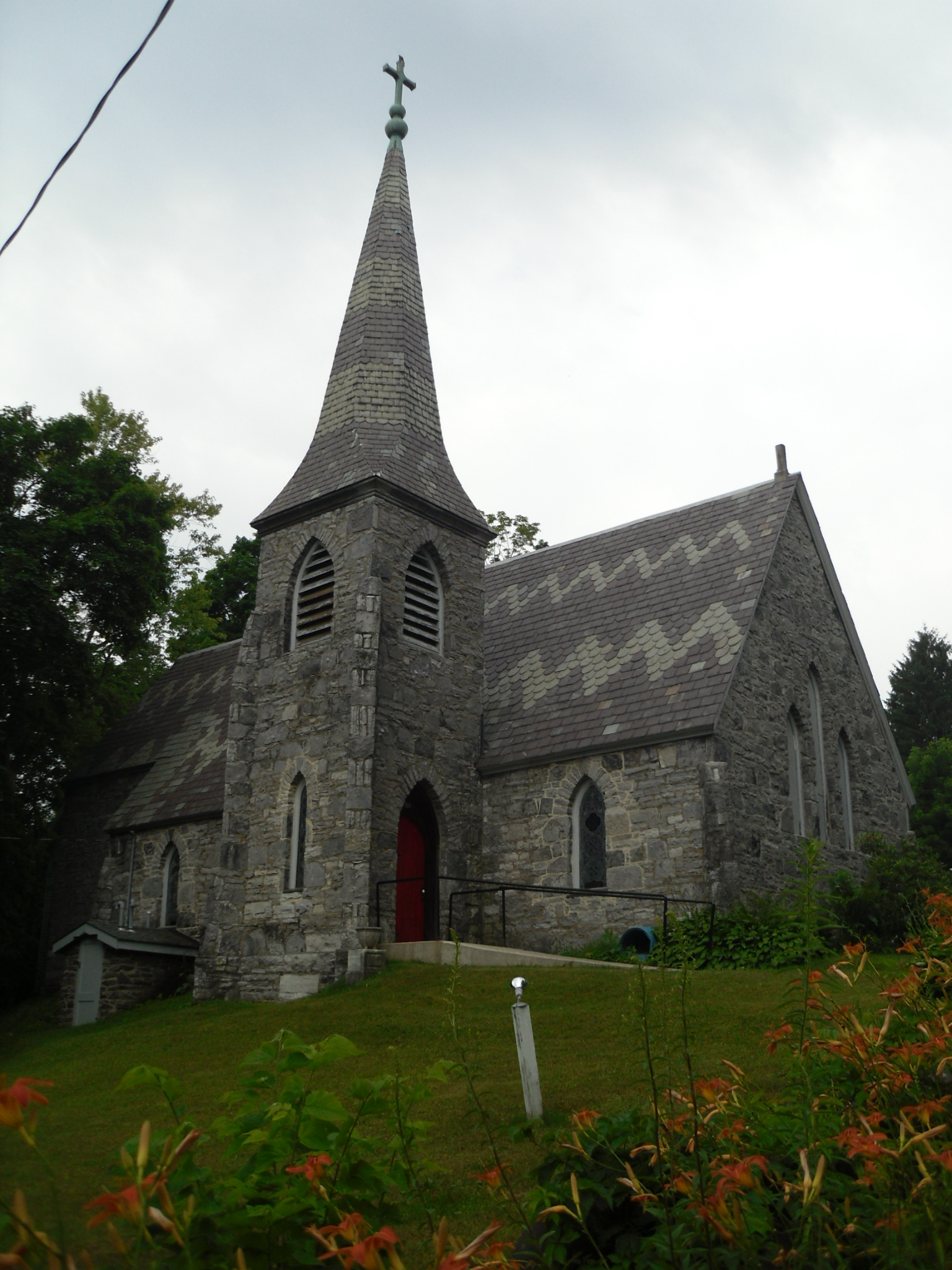
- St. Stephen's Episcopal Church, June 2010
- St. Stephen's Episcopal Church
- Location: 1 Grove Street; Schuylerville, New York
- Country: United States
- Denomination: Episcopal
- Website: www.episcopalchurch-schuylerville.org

History
- Founded: 1838

Administration
- Province: Province 2
- Diocese: Albany

Clergy
- Bishop: Jeremiah Williamson
- Rector: The Rev. Dr. Donna J. Arnold
- St. Stephen's Episcopal Church
- U.S. National Register of Historic Places
- Location within New York Location within the United States
- Coordinates: 43°5′48″N 73°35′2″W
- Area: 1 acre (0.40 ha)
- Built: 1868
- Architectural style: Gothic Revival
- NRHP reference No.: 05000264
- Added to NRHP: April 6, 2005

St. Stephen's Episcopal Church is a historic Episcopal church at 1 Grove Street in Schuylerville, Saratoga County, New York. It was built in 1868 and is a cruciform plan church building in the Gothic Revival style. It is built of quarry faced stone block laid in random ashlar. It features a steeply pitched gable roof and polygonal steeple, both covered in ornate polychrome slate.

It was listed on the National Register of Historic Places in 2005.
