= Saratoga, New York =

Saratoga
- Town
- Town of Saratoga
- Flag
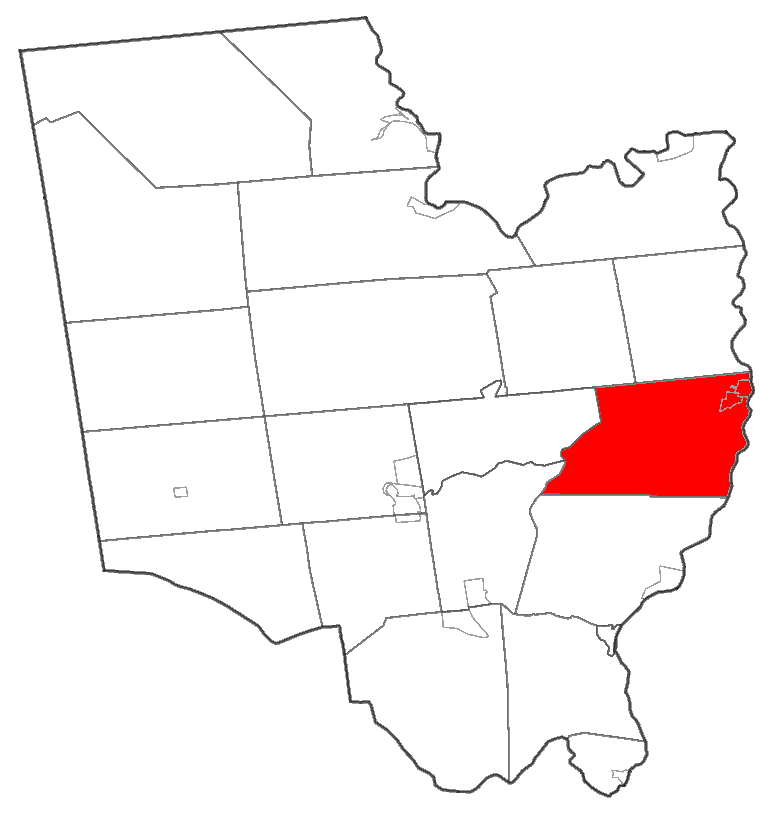
- Location within Saratoga County

- Location within the state of New York
- Coordinates: 43°3′N 73°39′W
- Country: United States
- State: New York
- County: Saratoga

Government
  - Supervisor: Ian Murray

Area
  - Total: 42.90 sq mi (111.11 km^{2})
  - Land: 40.56 sq mi (105.05 km^{2})
  - Water: 2.34 sq mi (6.06 km^{2})
- Elevation: 440 ft (134 m)

Population (2020)
  - Total: 5,808
  - Density: 143.2/sq mi (55.29/km^{2})
- Time zone: UTC-5 (Eastern (EST))
  - Summer (DST): UTC-4 (EDT)
- FIPS code: 36-65244
- GNIS feature ID: 0979461
- Website: www.townofsaratoga.com

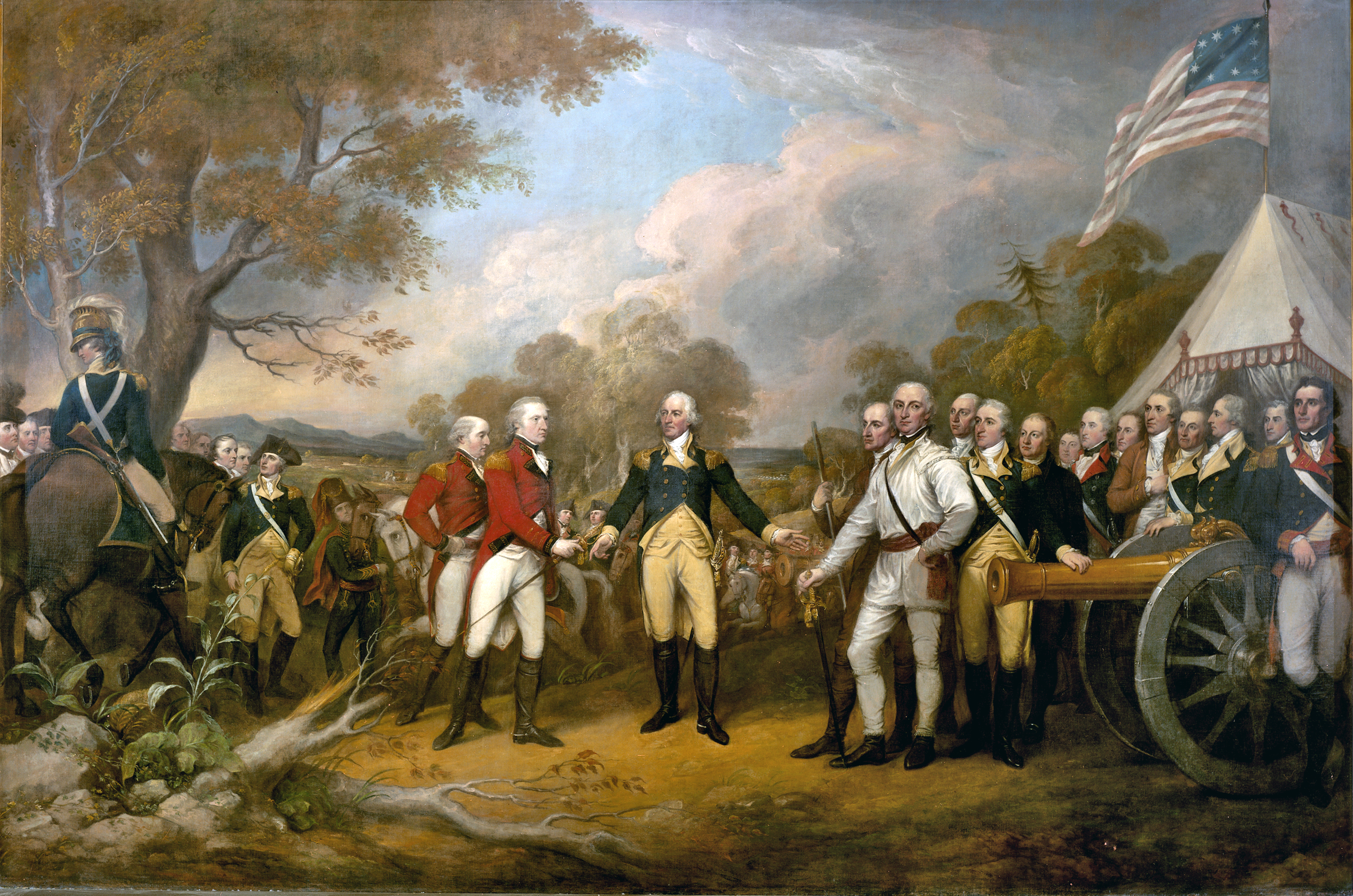
Burgoyne surrenders to Gates after the Battles

Saratoga is a town in Saratoga County, New York, United States. The population was 5,808 at the 2020 census. The name "Saratoga" is also commonly, though unofficially, used to refer to the nearby and more populous city of Saratoga Springs. The principal village within the town of Saratoga is Schuylerville, which is frequently—but not officially—referred to as Old Saratoga. The town also includes a second incorporated village, Victory.

Saratoga is a corruption of a Mohawk word. It was the name of Indian hunting grounds located along both sides of the Hudson River. According to the town's history, it derives from se-rach-ta-gue, meaning "the hillside country of the quiet river".

Saratoga is located on the eastern border of Saratoga County and is located east of Saratoga Springs, and is bordered by Saratoga Lake and the Hudson River.

The town sends students to Saratoga Springs City School District, Schuylerville Central School District, and Stillwater Central School District.

== History ==
The name may derive from the Iroquoian se-rach-ta-gue or sa-ra-ta-ke, which the early Dutch settlers rendered as "Sarachtoge". A second early version of the name is, "Saraghtogo" but the origin remains unproven and thus uncertain.

The location was first settled at the end of the 17th century as "Fort Saratoga". Saratoga soon became contested land between British and French colonial forces, and the village of Saratoga (now Schuylerville) was destroyed by the French in 1745 during King George's War.

Saratoga was originally a district of Albany County stretching from north of the Mohawk River to Northumberland, including lands for six miles on both sides of the Hudson River. In 1775, the three districts were Ballstown, Halfmoon, and Saratoga.

It is best known as the location that British General John Burgoyne surrendered to American General Horatio Gates at the end of the Battles of Saratoga on October 17, 1777, often cited as the turning point for the United States during the American Revolution. The two battles took place in the town of Stillwater to the south, but the final 10 days of siege and the actual surrender ceremony took place in Saratoga (Schuylerville).

In 1788, an act was passed organizing towns in place of districts and Stillwater was created from the Saratoga District, making four towns in what would become Saratoga County. These four mother towns were subdivided into the present 19 towns. The original town of Saratoga included the modern-day towns of Easton, Northumberland, Moreau, Wilton, portions of Greenfield and Corinth, and the city of Saratoga Springs. The first loss of territory was in 1789 to the town of Easton (now in Washington County). In 1798, the towns of Corinth, Greenfield, Northumberland, Moreau, and Wilton split from the town of Saratoga. In 1805, a narrow strip in the southwestern part of Saratoga was annexed to the town of Malta. In 1819, the town of Saratoga Springs was formed from the rest of the western part of the town of Saratoga. Later, this would become the city of Saratoga Springs.

The Saratoga Race Course, in the adjoining city of Saratoga Springs, is the oldest operating horse-racing course in the US.

== Geography ==
According to the United States Census Bureau, the town has a total area of 42.9 square miles (111 km^{2}), of which 40.7 square miles (105 km^{2}) are land and 2.2 square miles (5.7 km^{2}) (5.22%) are water.

The town line is formed by the Hudson River and is the border of Washington County. Fish Creek, a tributary of the Hudson, is the outflow of Saratoga Lake.

== Transportation ==
U.S. Route 4 (Turning Point Trail) follows the Hudson River along the eastern part of the town. New York State Route 29 (General Philip Schuyler Commemorative Highway) is an east–west highway, intersecting US-4 at Schuylerville. New York State Route 32 is a north–south highway, partly conjoined with US-4 near Schuylerville.

== Demographics ==
Historical population
| Census | Pop. | Note | %± |
|---|---|---|---|
| 1790 | 3,071 | | — |
| 1820 | 2,233 | | — |
| 1830 | 2,461 | | 10.2% |
| 1840 | 2,624 | | 6.6% |
| 1850 | 3,492 | | 33.1% |
| 1860 | 3,843 | | 10.1% |
| 1870 | 4,052 | | 5.4% |
| 1880 | 4,539 | | 12.0% |
| 1890 | 3,855 | | −15.1% |
| 1900 | 3,999 | | 3.7% |
| 1910 | 3,942 | | −1.4% |
| 1920 | 3,680 | | −6.6% |
| 1930 | 3,027 | | −17.7% |
| 1940 | 3,212 | | 6.1% |
| 1950 | 3,225 | | 0.4% |
| 1960 | 3,515 | | 9.0% |
| 1970 | 4,206 | | 19.7% |
| 1980 | 4,595 | | 9.2% |
| 1990 | 5,069 | | 10.3% |
| 2000 | 5,141 | | 1.4% |
| 2010 | 5,674 | | 10.4% |
| 2020 | 5,808 | | 2.4% |
U.S. Decennial Census

As of the census of 2000, 5,141 people, 2,026 households, and 1,387 families resided in the town. The population density was 126.4 inhabitants per square mile (48.8/km^{2}). The 2,286 housing units averaged 56.2 per square mile (21.7/km^{2}). The racial makeup of the town was 97.80% White, 0.97% African American, 0.06% Native American, 0.16% Asian, 0.06% Pacific Islander, 0.23% from other races, and 0.72% from two or more races. Hispanics or Latinos of any race were 1.17% of the population.

Of the 2,026 households, 31.5% had children under the age of 18 living with them, 54.9% were married couples living together, 9.4% had a female householder with no husband present, and 31.5% were not families. About 24.5% of all households were made up of individuals, and 9.7% had someone living alone who was 65 years of age or older. The average household size was 2.51 and the average family size was 3.00.

In the town, the population was distributed as 24.6% under the age of 18, 6.9% from 18 to 24, 29.9% from 25 to 44, 25.7% from 45 to 64, and 12.9% who were 65 years of age or older. The median age was 38 years. For every 100 females, there were 99.7 males. For every 100 females age 18 and over, there were 96.2 males.

The median income for a household in the town was $42,727, and for a family was $48,482. Males had a median income of $33,178 versus $27,654 for females. The per capita income for the town was $21,716. About 6.1% of families and 7.3% of the population were below the poverty line, including 6.8% of those under age 18 and 6.2% of those age 65 or over.

== Communities and locations in Saratoga ==
- Burgoyne – A hamlet in the northern part of the town, it is named after the commander of the British forces at the Battles of Saratoga.
- Cedar Bluffs, New York – A hamlet on the eastern shore of Saratoga Lake
- Coveville – A hamlet along the Hudson River, located by The Cove on US-4
- The Cove – An arm of the Hudson River
- Deans Corners – A hamlet in the northwestern quarter of the town located at the junction of County Roads 67 and 70
- Gates (hamlet) – A hamlet in the northern part of the town named after the commander of the American forces at the Battles of Saratoga
- Grangerville, New York – A hamlet near the northern town line, west of Schuylerville on NY-29
- Maple Shade, New York – A hamlet on the eastern shore of Saratoga Lake, south of Cedar Bluffs
- Meyer Corners – A location in the southwestern section of Saratoga at the intersection of County Roads 70 and 71
- Quaker Springs – A hamlet in the southern part of the town on NY-32
- Saratoga Lake – (1) A hamlet at the northern end of (2) a lake named Saratoga Lake
- Saratoga National Historical Park – A national historical park that includes the Schuyler House, Saratoga Monument, Victory Woods, Sword Surrender Site, and the Battlefield (in Stillwater).
- Schuylerville – A village in the northeastern section of the town, located on US-4, NY-29&32, Champlain Canal, and Hudson River
- Victory – A village in the northeastern part of the town, located on NY-32
- Victory Mills – A post office name and the name of the last major mill in the village of Victory

== See also ==
- USS Saratoga, 7 ships
