= Bullard Block (Schuylerville, New York) =

Historic commercial building in New York, United States

- U.S. National Register of Historic Places
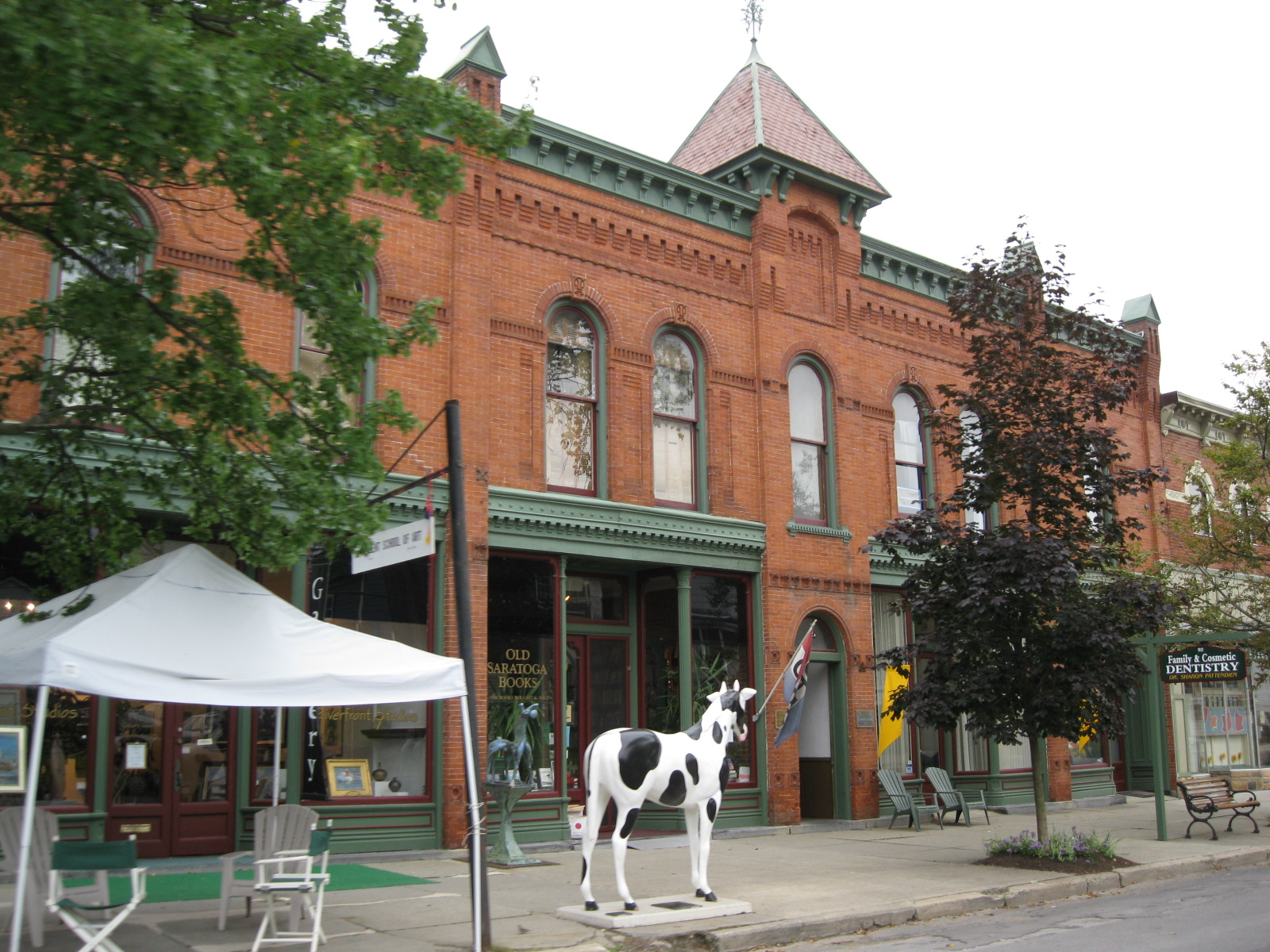
- Bullard Block, August 2009

- Location within New York Location within the United States
- Location: 90-98 Broad St., Schuylerville, New York
- Coordinates: 43°5′55.25″N 73°34′54.03″W
- Area: 0.36 acres (0.15 ha)
- Built: 1881
- Architectural style: High Victorian Gothic
- NRHP reference No.: 09000723
- Added to NRHP: September 16, 2009

Bullard Block is a historic commercial building located at Schuylerville in Saratoga County, New York. It was built in 1881 and is a rectangular two story brick building on a limestone foundation in the High Victorian Gothic style. It has five storefront bays and originally housed the National Bank of Schuylerville.

It was listed on the National Register of Historic Places in 2009.
