= General Schuyler House =

Building in Schuylerville, New York

Coordinates: 43°05′45″N 73°34′54″W

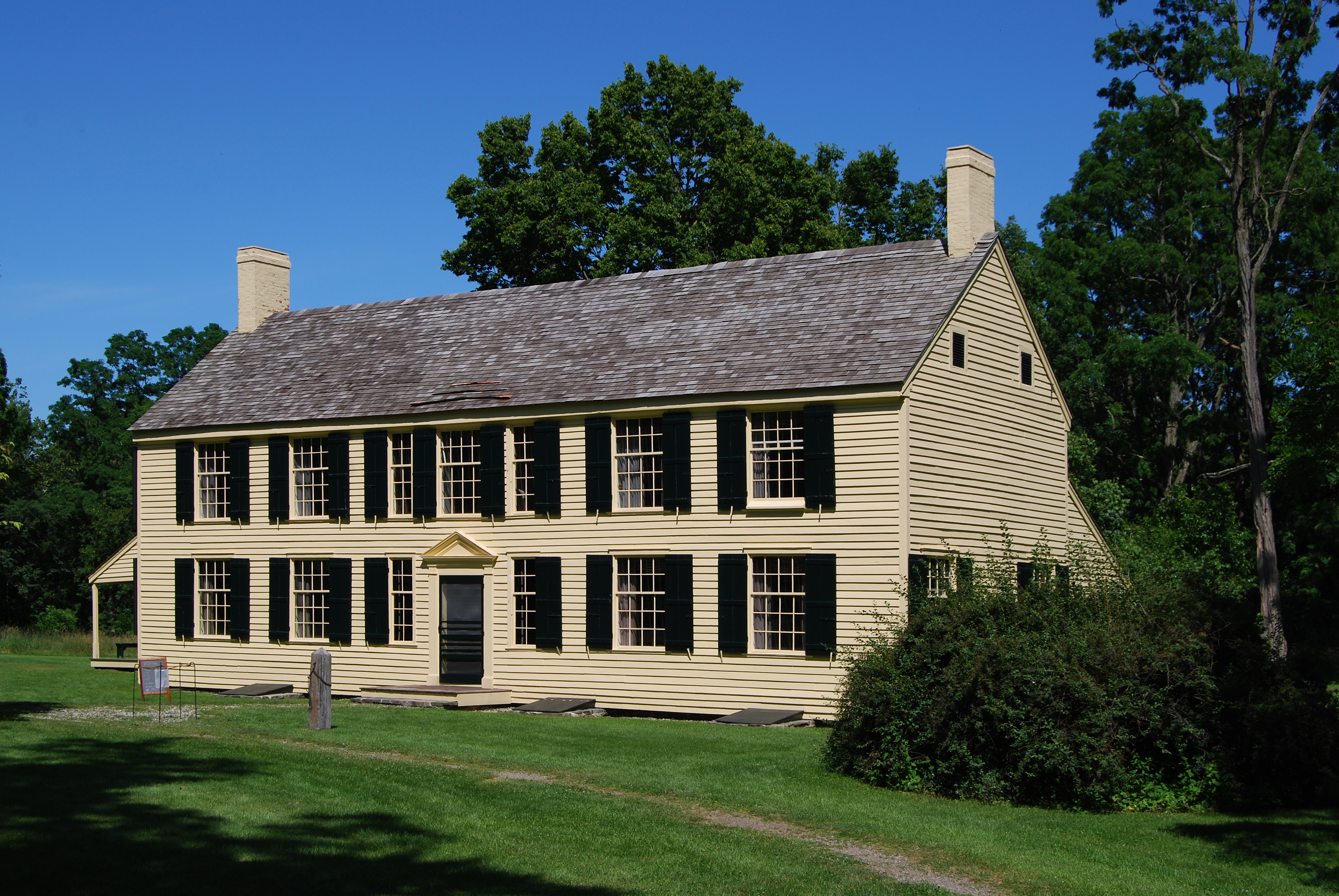
General Schuyler House.

The Schuyler House or General Schuyler House was built in November 1777 over 29 days for General Philip Schuyler (later Senator Schuyler, and Alexander Hamilton's father-in-law). It is now part of Saratoga National Historical Park (located eight miles away). The British Army occupied the house during the American Revolution and burned it down during their retreat, under the command of General John Burgoyne.

After the British surrender, it was rebuilt, incorporating salvaged glass, nails, locks, and hinges recovered from the burned home. General Schuyler conducted his business affairs from the home. It was visited by George Washington, Thomas Jefferson, James Madison, the Marquis de Lafayette and President Franklin D. Roosevelt. It was given to the U.S. government. It has no electricity or running water and remains largely as it was in 1777. The home is open to the public from late May to Labor Day.

== See also ==
- Schuyler Mansion
