= Saratoga National Historical Park =

Park in Stillwater, New York

- IUCN category III (natural monument or feature)
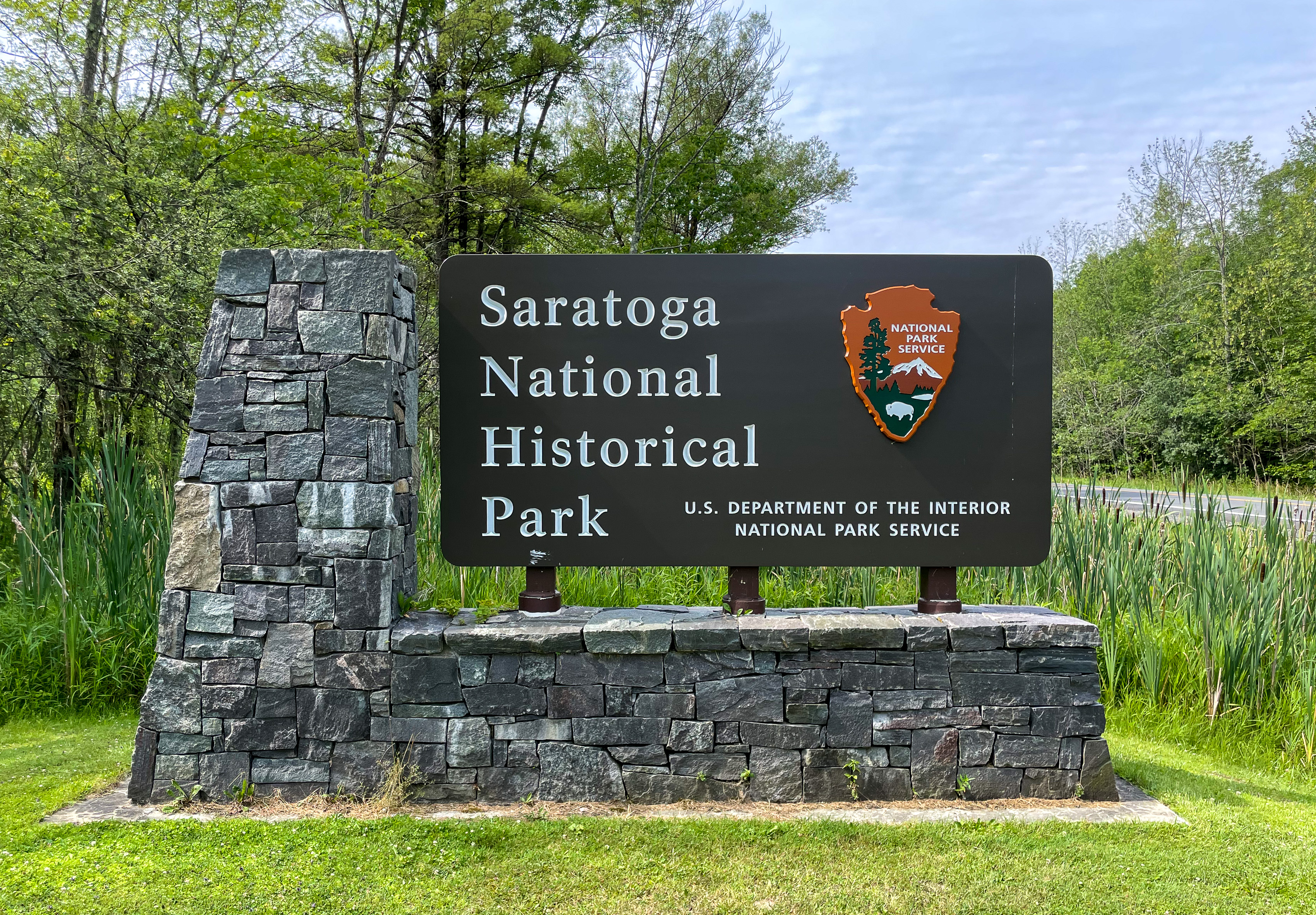

- Location within New York Location within the United States
- Location: Stillwater, Saratoga County, New York, United States
- Nearest city: Saratoga Springs, New York
- Coordinates: 42°59′56″N 73°38′15″W
- Area: 3,392 acres (13.73 km^{2})
- Established: June 1, 1938
- Visitors: 119,249 (in 2025)
- Governing body: National Park Service
- Website: Saratoga National Historical Park
- Saratoga National Historical Park
- U.S. National Register of Historic Places
- NRHP reference No.: 66000569
- Added to NRHP: October 15, 1966

Saratoga National Historical Park is a United States National Historical Park located in the Town of Stillwater in eastern New York, 30 miles (48 km) north of Albany. The park preserves the site of the Battles of Saratoga. In 2015, the United States Mint released a commemorative quarter as part of the America the Beautiful series honoring the park.

== Description ==
The park preserves the site of the Battles of Saratoga, the first significant American military victory of the American Revolutionary War. Here in 1777, American forces met, defeated, and forced a major British army to surrender, an event which led France to recognize the independence of the United States, and enter the war as a decisive military ally of the struggling Americans.

First authorized as a New York state historic preserve in 1927 on the sesquicentennial of the Battles, the Battlefield was made part of the National Park System in 1938 when Saratoga National Historical Park was authorized by the United States Congress.

The Visitors Center offers a 20-minute orientation film, fiber-optic light map, timeline and artifact displays. A brochure is available for a self-guided tour of sites in the four-square-mile (10 km^{2}) battlefield in Stillwater. General Philip Schuyler's Schuyler House is located eight miles (13 km) north in Schuylerville. It is a restored house museum open by tour. The Saratoga Battle Monument is in the nearby village of Victory.

The park is located on the upper Hudson River southeast of Saratoga Springs. It contains the famous Boot Monument to Benedict Arnold, the only war memorial in the United States that does not bear the name of its honoree. The memorial was donated by John Watts de Peyster, a former major general for the New York State Militia during the American Civil War who wrote several military histories about the Battle of Saratoga.

== Saratoga Surrender Site Memorial Park ==
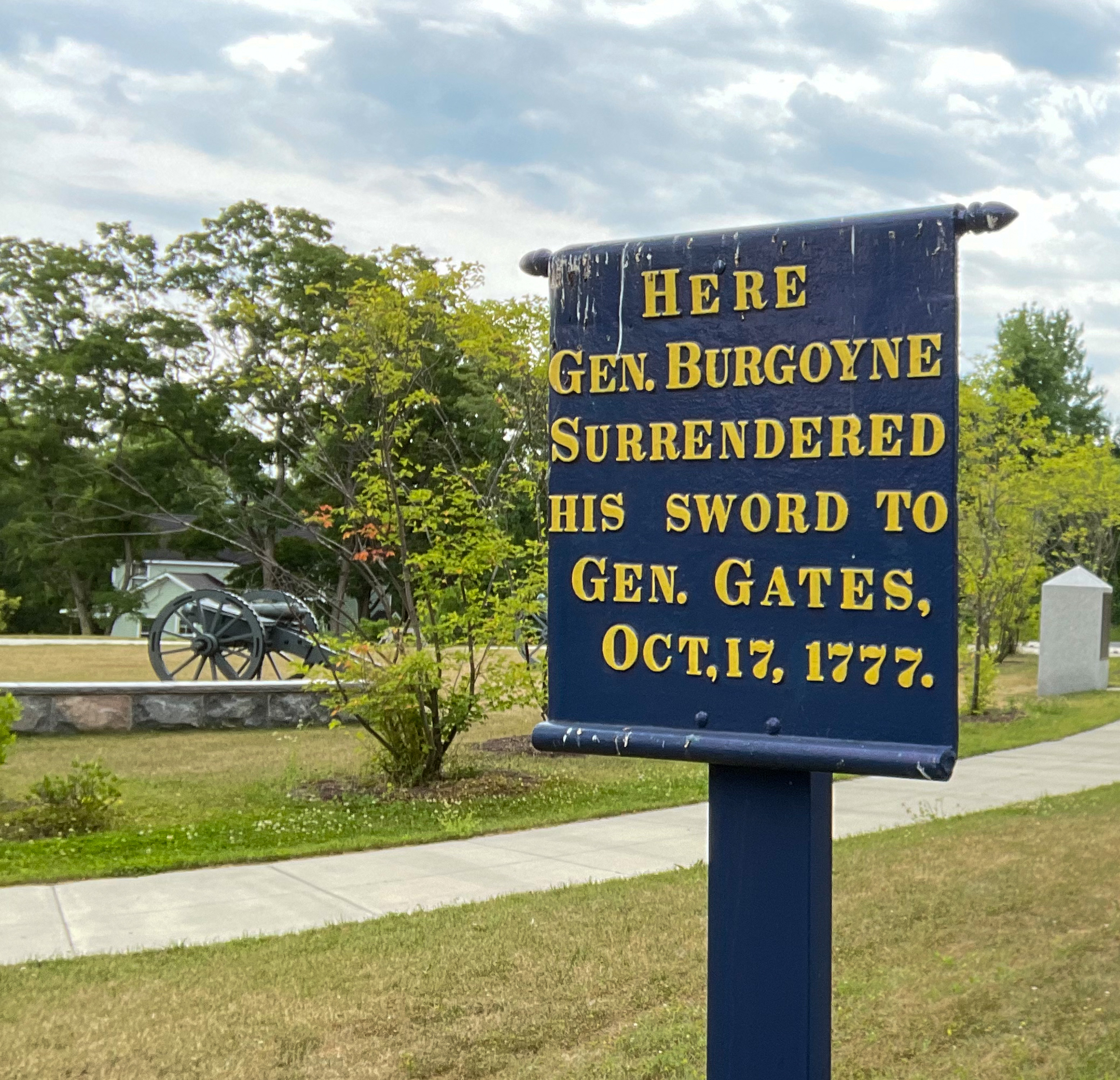
Saratoga Surrender Site Memorial Park sign

In 2021, management of the site where the British Army surrendered was transferred to the National Park Service. The Saratoga Surrender Site Memorial Park marks the precise location where British General John Burgoyne surrendered his army to General Horatio Gates on October 17, 1777. The 19-acre (7.7 ha) park is located 9 miles (14 km) north of the Saratoga Battlefield Park, and a 0.5 miles (0.80 km) south of Schuylerville on U.S. Route 4. The park includes explanatory plaques and signage, and two cannons.

The land is owned by the Open Space Institute and managed by the National Park Service, and is open to visitors from dawn to dusk year-round.

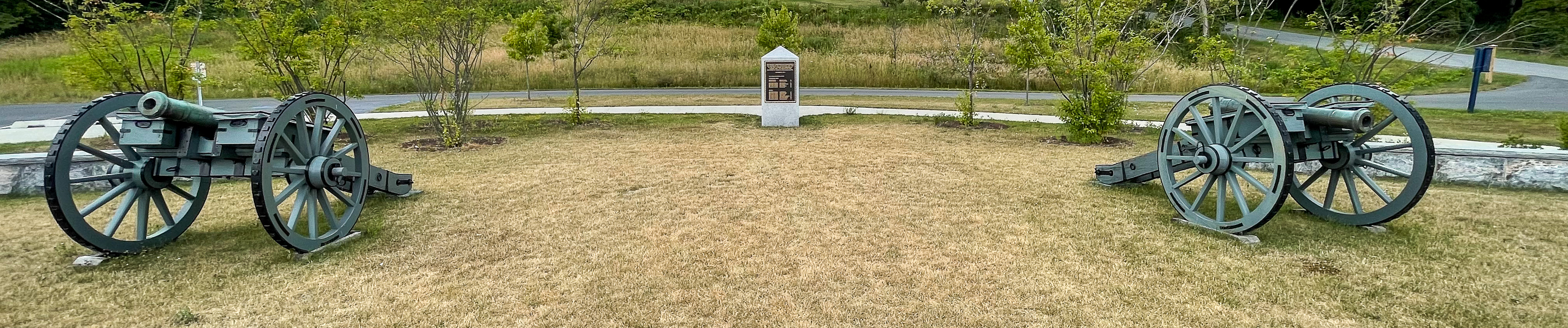
Cannons at the Saratoga Surrender Site Memorial Park

== Nearby Battles of Saratoga locations not included in the SNHP ==
The Marshall House, on the National Register of Historic Places, lies eight miles (13 km) north of the main entrance to the park on US 4 and NY 32 north of the village of Schuylerville. It was made famous by Baroness Frederika Riedesel in her Letters and Journals relating to the War of the American Revolution, and the Capture of the German Troops at Saratoga. This house was built in 1770–1773.

During the closing days of the Battles of Saratoga, Baroness Riedesel sheltered there together with the wives of officers of the British army and wounded personnel. Her account of the travails of those around her, her keen insight into the personalities of the principal officers of both the British and American armies and her devotion to her husband in peril have led some commentators to name her as the first woman war correspondent. The Marshall House was bombarded by the Americans who supposed it an enemy headquarters.

Within are conserved cannonballs and other reminders of the ordeal suffered by those who took refuge there. The Marshall House is the sole surviving structure in the battles' area. The property is privately owned.

As of mid-2023, the American Battlefield Trust and its partners have acquired and preserved 26 acres (11 ha) of the battlefield outside of the national park.

== Gallery ==
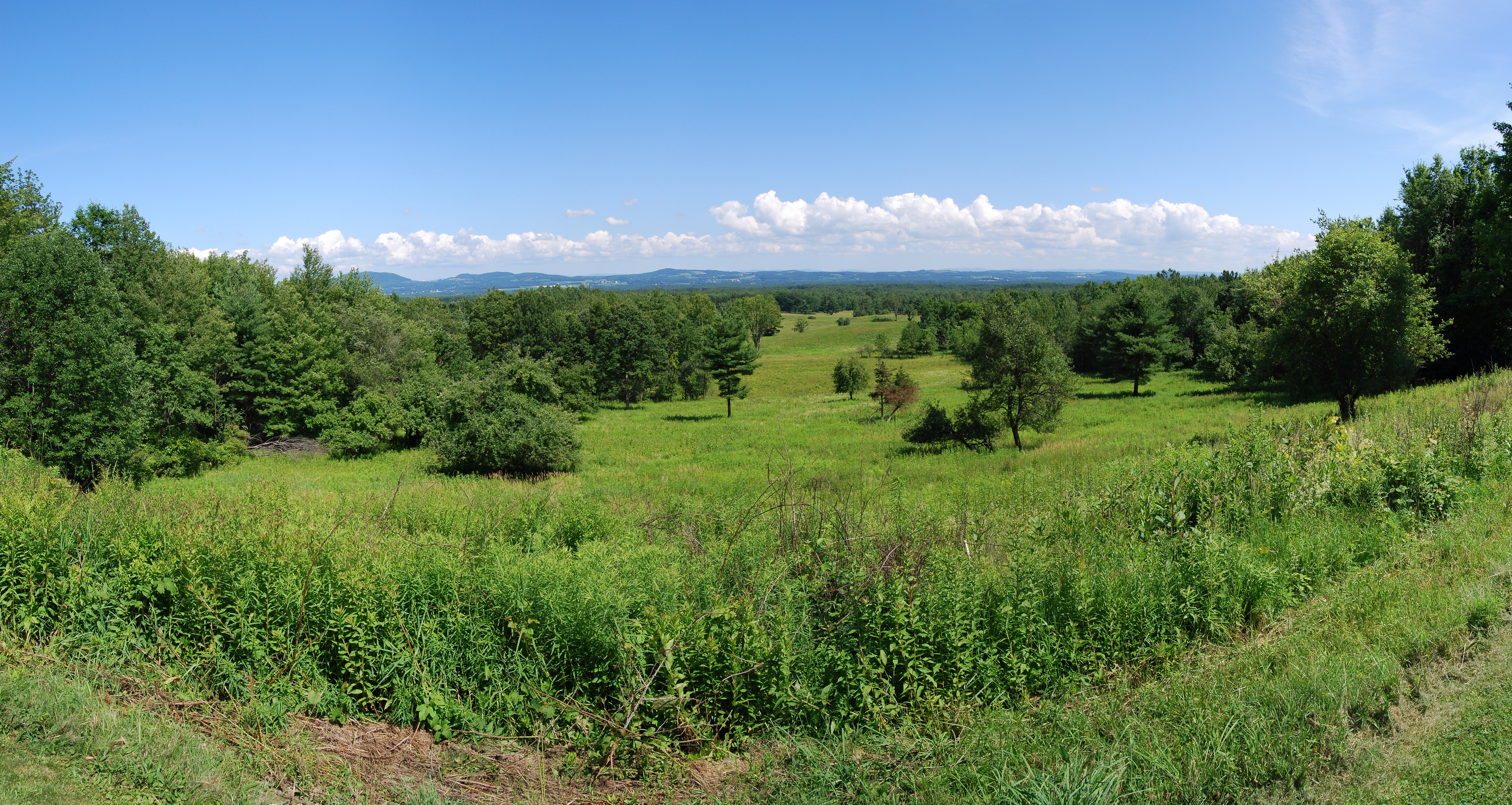
View of the battlefield

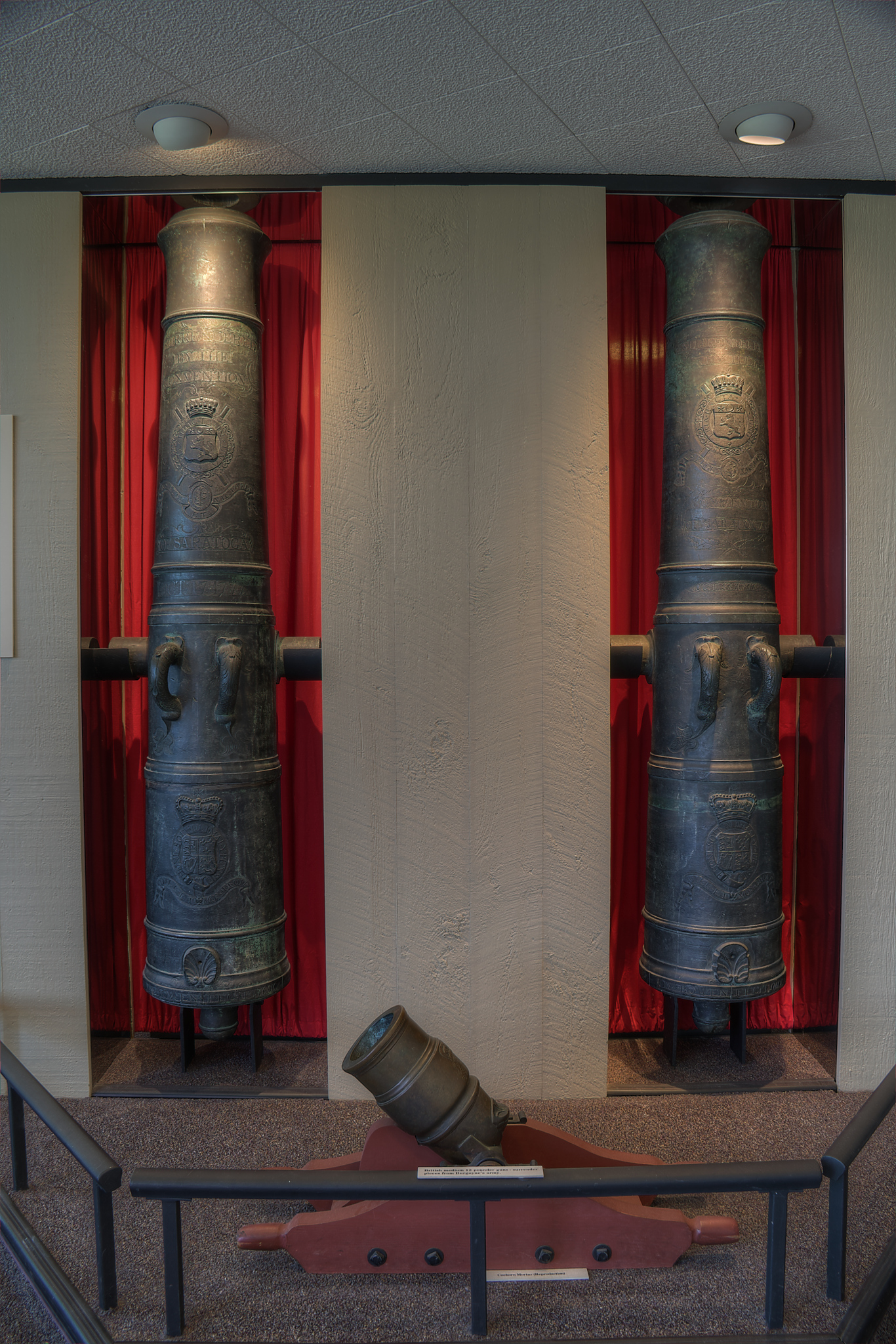
Trophy Cannon from the Battle of Saratoga

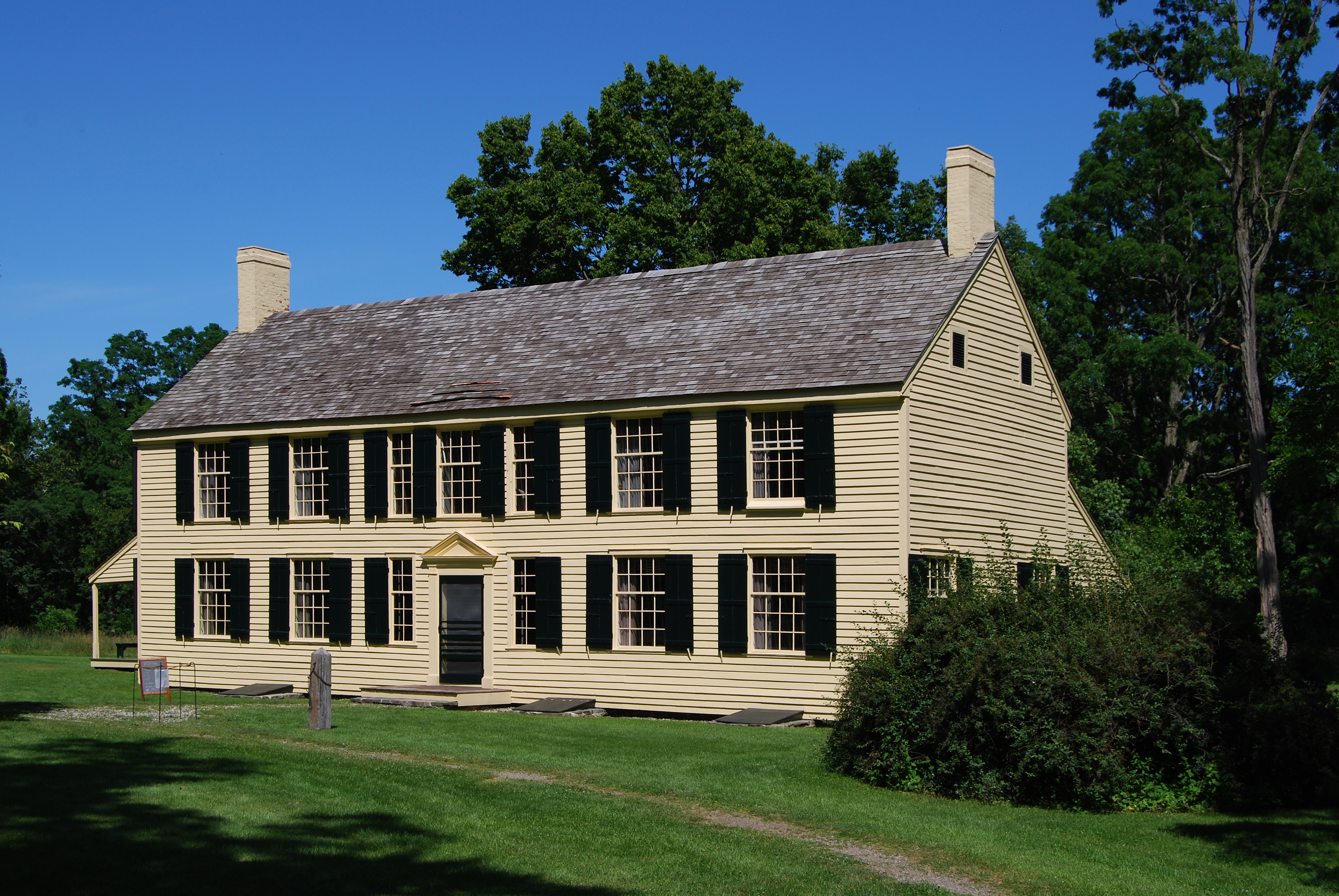
General Philip Schuyler House

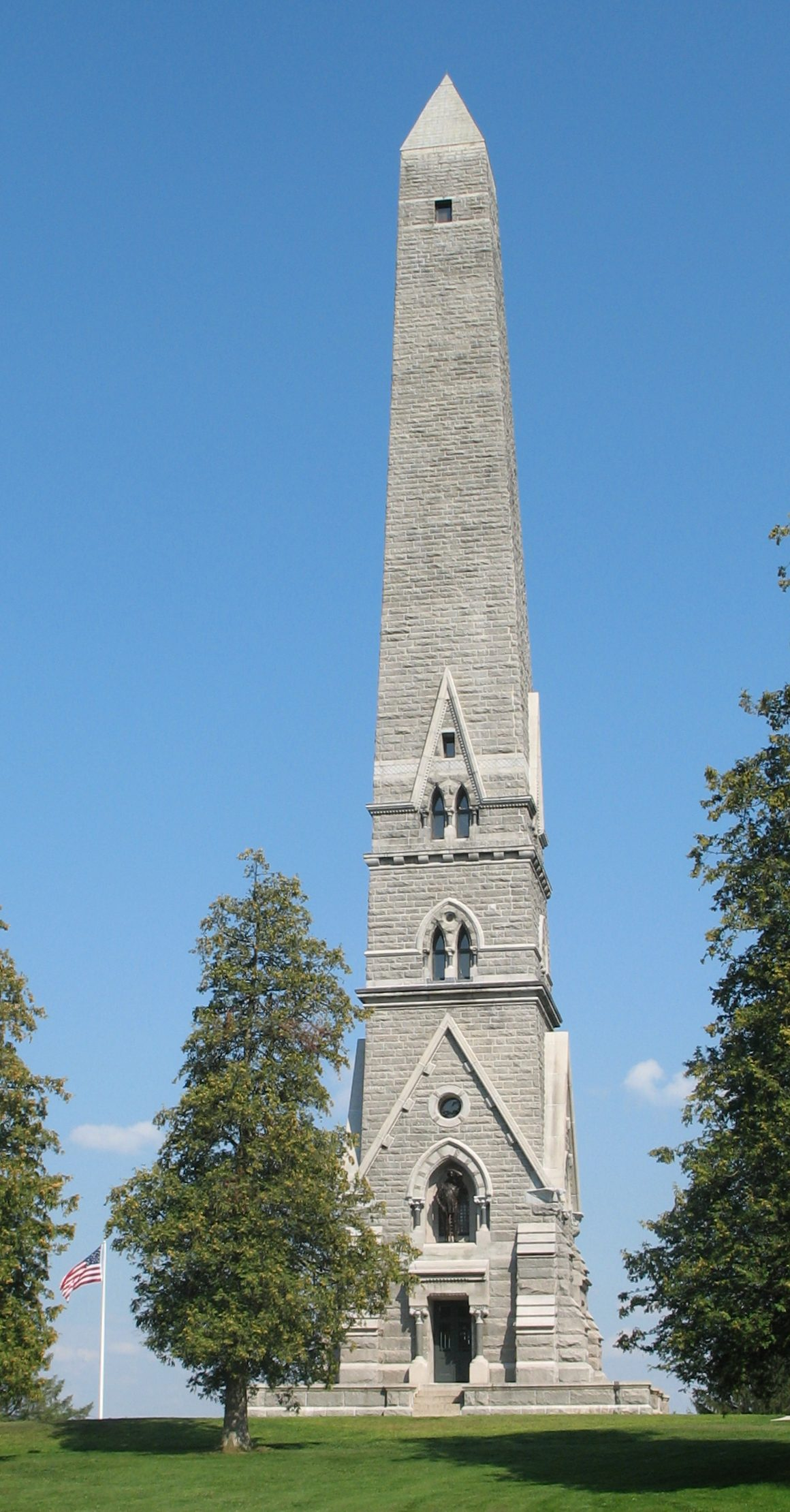
Masonic Saratoga Monument

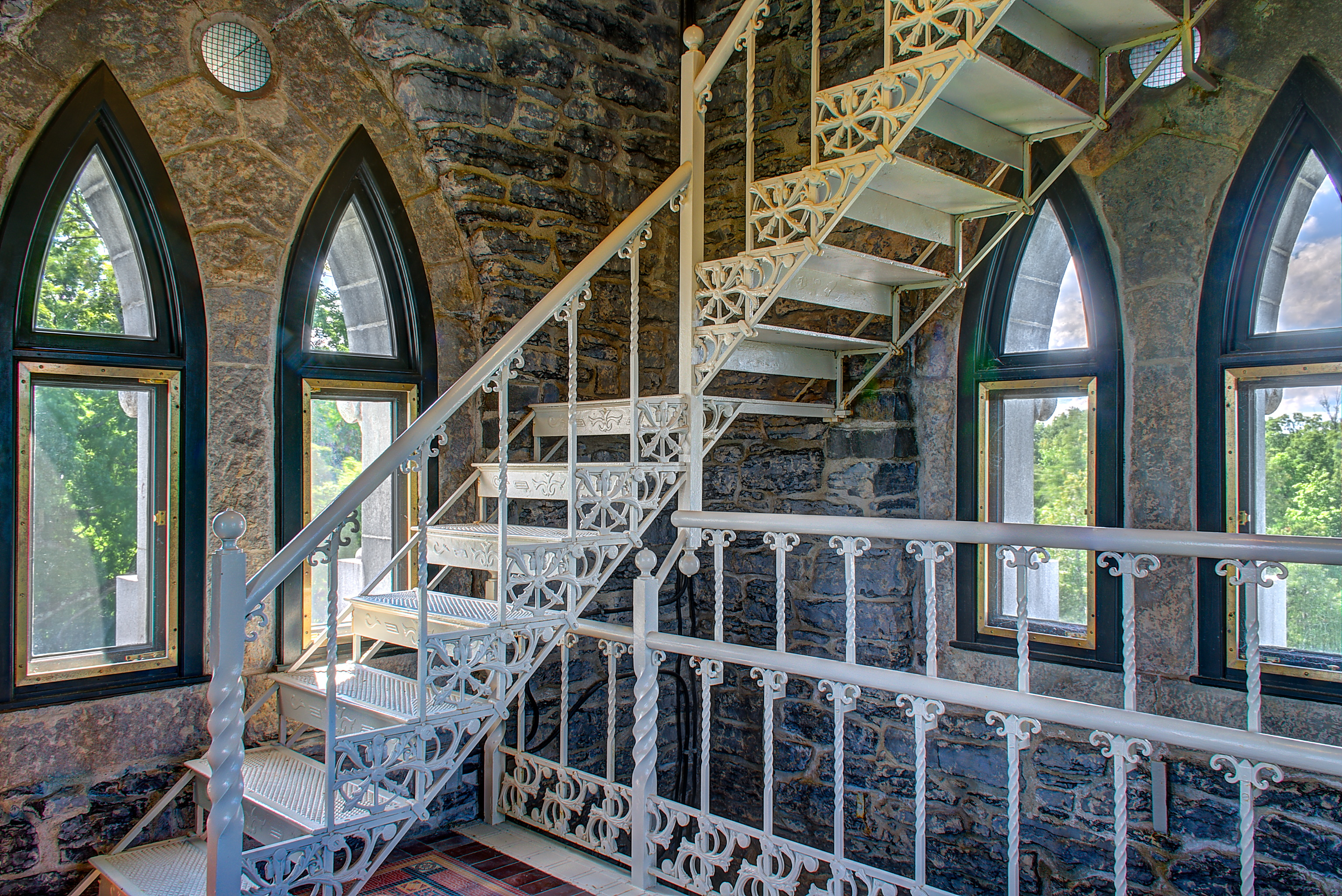
View from middle level of monument

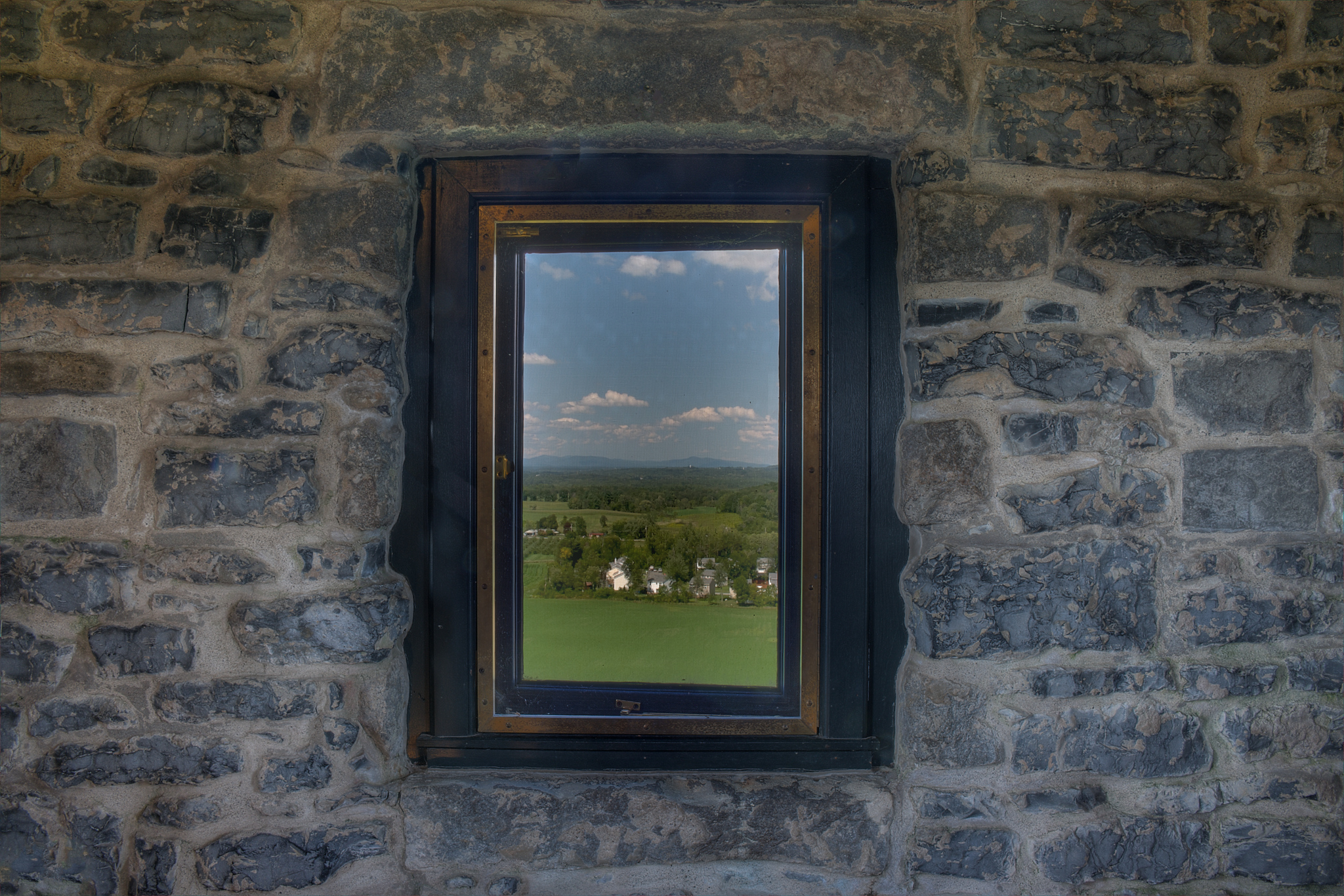
View from top of monument

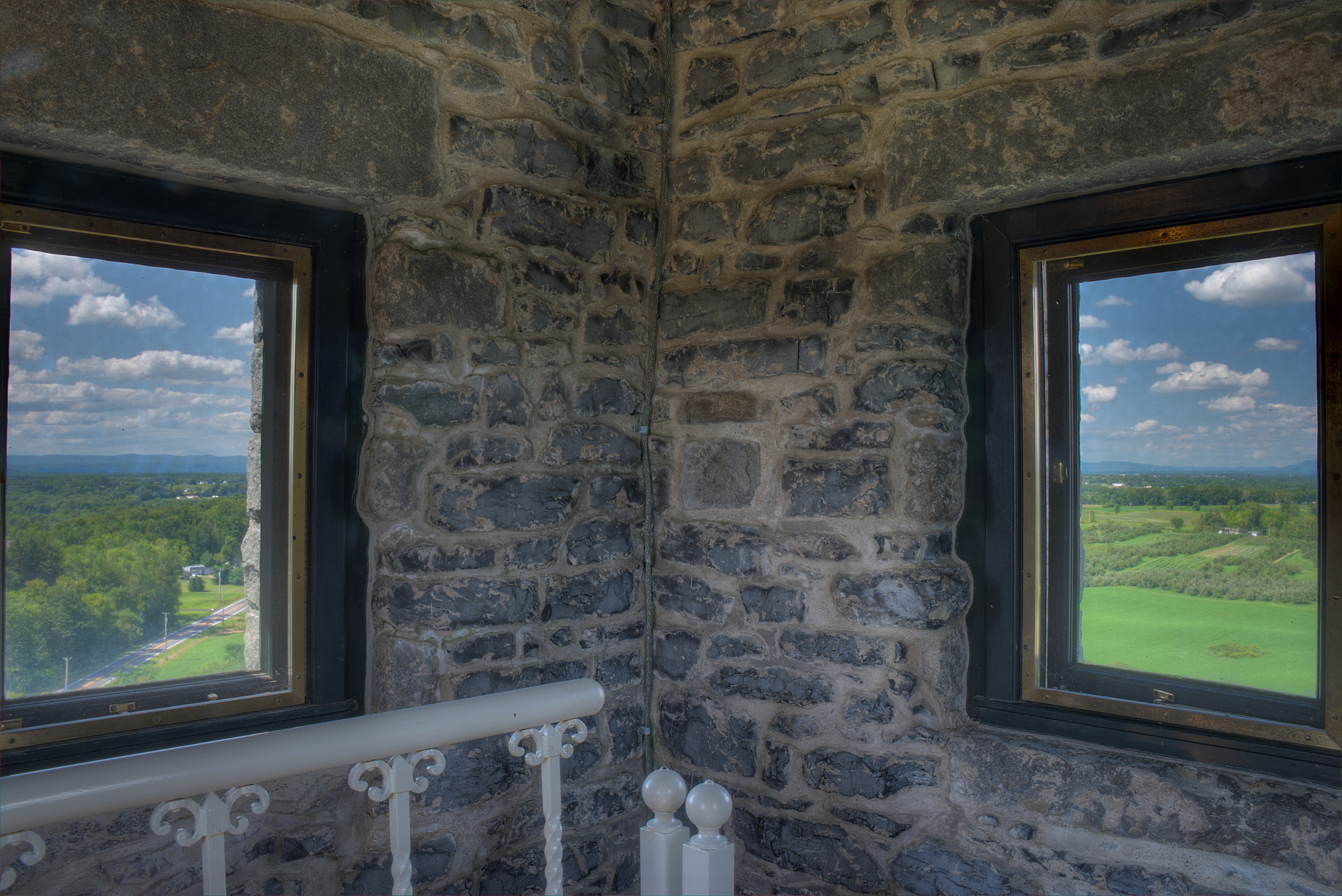
View from top of monument
