= Saratoga lake houses =

The Saratoga lake houses were a group of nightclubs operating in the vicinity of Lake Lonely on the east side of Saratoga Springs, New York from the 1920s until the early 1950s. They offered fine dining and top quality entertainment along with illegal liquor during prohibition and illegal gambling.

Although there were many speakeasies in Saratoga Springs during this period, six were well known as "lake houses": The Arrowhead Inn, Riley's Lake House, The Piping Rock Club, Newman's Lake House, The Meadow Brook (earlier Mayfair), and Smith's Interlaken.

== Origins ==
During the 1800s establishments known as "lake houses" surrounded Saratoga Lake, offering fine dining in a country atmosphere a short excursion out of town. Many advertised "Fish and Game Dinners", and featured fish caught in Saratoga Lake and cooked immediately. Moon's Lake House, the reputed site of the invention of the potato chip is the most well known, but there were Myers Lake House, Avery's Lake House, and Crum's Place and the White Sulphur Spring Hotel at the south end of the lake.

John Morrissey opened the Saratoga Race Course in 1863. In 1866 he opened the Saratoga Clubhouse downtown, offering high-stakes gambling for the town's fashionable visitors. The clubhouse was later bought by Richard Canfield and was expanded to today's Canfield Casino. However, in 1907 Saratoga Springs banned gambling in the city and the casino was closed.

== Prohibition ==
In 1920, the Eighteenth Amendment to the U.S. Constitution went into effect, prohibiting the manufacture, transportation, and sale of alcoholic beverages. Saratoga Springs soon became a center for bootlegging between Canada and Albany. "Bootleggers shipping booze from Canada passed through the city. And the roadside inns around its outskirts were ideal places to make stops."

Enterprising criminals, sensing an opportunity, quickly opened so-called carpet joints, which combined gambling, illegal liquor, fine dining and entertainment. The mobsters usually kept their involvement second- or third-hand, operating through local associates. One such operator was Louis J. "Doc" Farone, later convicted of "operation of three gambling houses in Saratoga Springs — (1) Riley's Lake House, (2) The Brook [i.e. Meadowbrook] and (3) Smith's Interlaken. ... although defendant was not the record holder of title to any of the three houses, he nevertheless held a beneficial interest in and controlled all of them"

The clubs were open mostly in the summer, from June until the close of the month-long Saratoga Race Meeting around the end of August. They featured entertainers such as Bing Crosby, Desi Arnaz, Jimmy Durante, Claudette Colbert, and Sophie Tucker.

Although illegal, the clubs received considerable support from local police and politicians. Off-duty police often worked security at the clubs, and police were frequently called to accompany transfers of money from the clubs to the bank. In 1952, Saratoga County Republican Chairman James Leary was indicted for perjury as a result of a gambling investigation. County Democratic chairman and former Saratoga Springs Public Safety Commissioner Arthur Leonard was indicted for conspiracy and bribery. Both men later had the charges dismissed.

== The clubs ==
=== The Brook Club ===
The first carpet joint in Saratoga Springs was The Brook Club, opened by gambler Arnold Rothstein in 1921. Rothstein is better known for fixing the 1919 World Series in the so-called Black Sox Scandal. Although not a "lake house"—The Brook Club was the former "Bonnie Brook" estate of George Saportas on Church Street on the west side of Saratoga Springs—it became the prototype of the later operations in the city and elsewhere. The Brook Club was managed by Nat Evans (or Evens, b. Nathaniel Evensky), a Rothstein associate who also worked with him on the World Series fix. In 1925, Evans bought Rothstein's share of the club. The Brook Club burned in 1934.

The Brook Club should not be confused with the Meadowbrook (see below) near Saratoga Lake, which was sometimes later called The Brook.

=== Arrowhead Inn ===
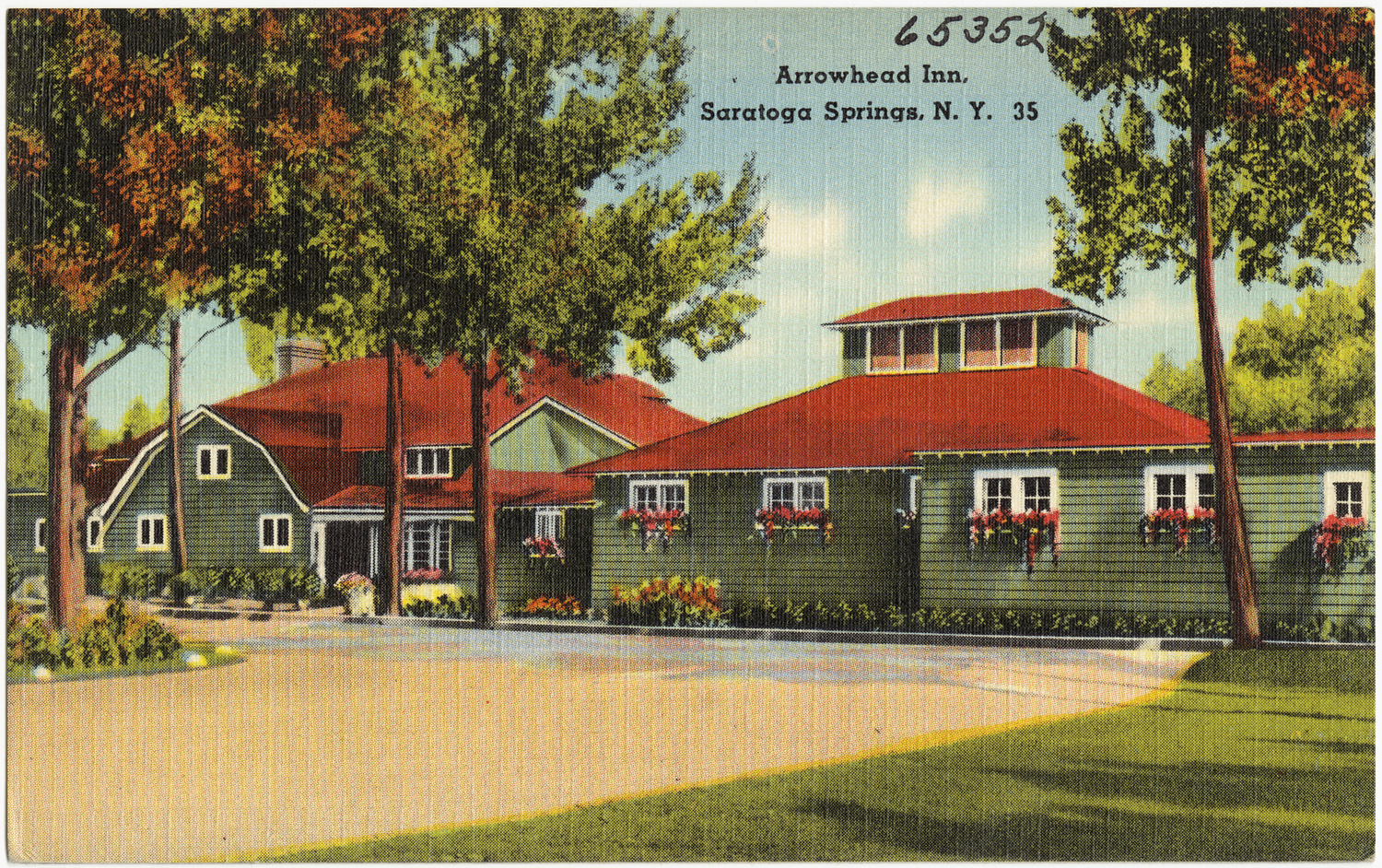
Arrowhead Inn

The Arrowhead was located on Arrowhead Road, off Crescent Avenue, near Saratoga Lake. It closed in 1949 and burned September 1969.

=== Meadowbrook ===
The Mayfair, later the Meadowbrook or simply "The Brook", opened June 29, 1934 on Union Avenue across from the Piping Rock. It burned in 1959.

=== Newman's Lake House ===
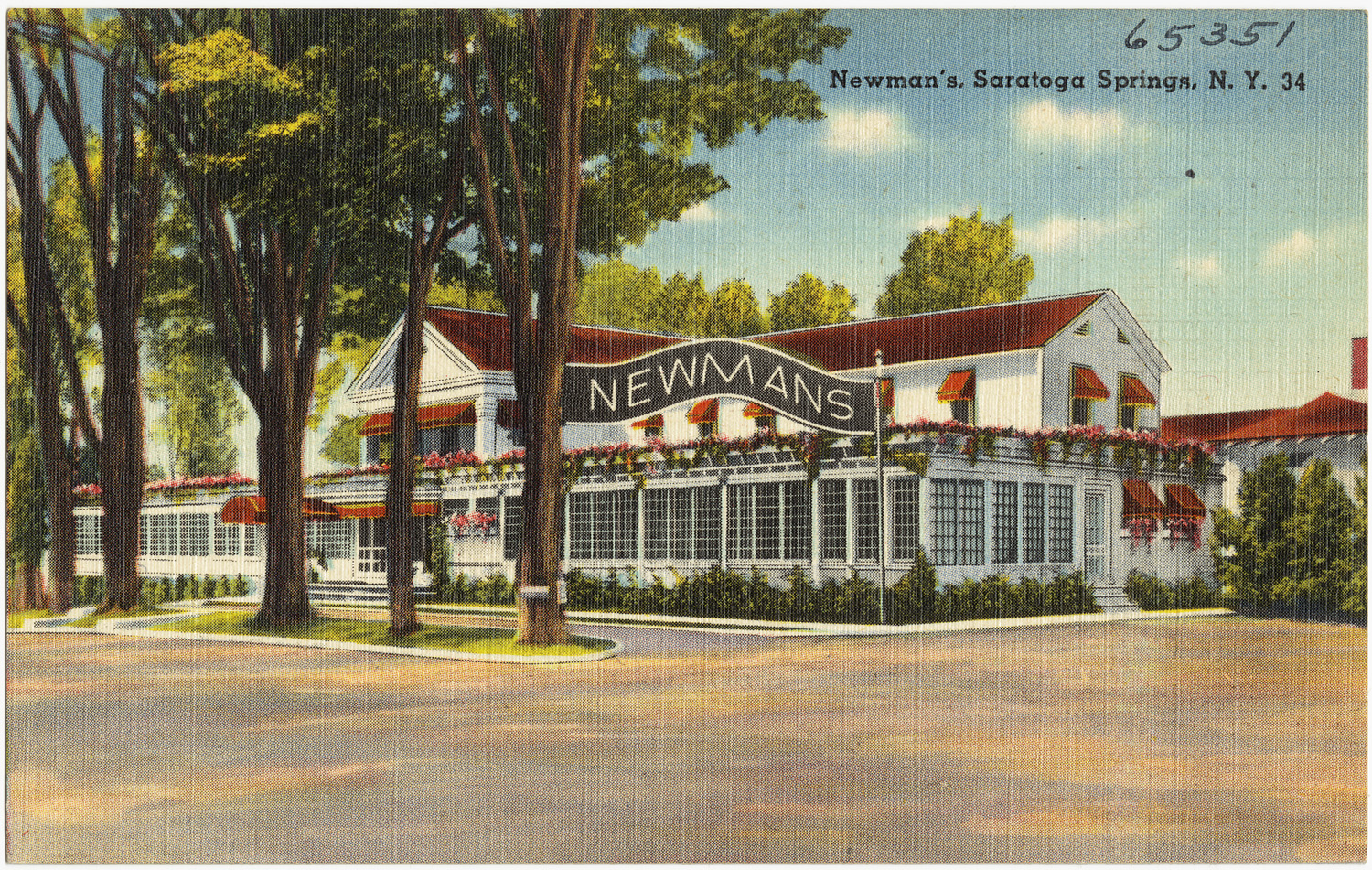
Newman's Lake House

John and Gerald King started Newman's Lake House on Crescent Avenue, on the site of a converted inn with a dining room that could seat 500. Newman's was renamed McGarrigle's in 1968.

=== Piping Rock Club ===
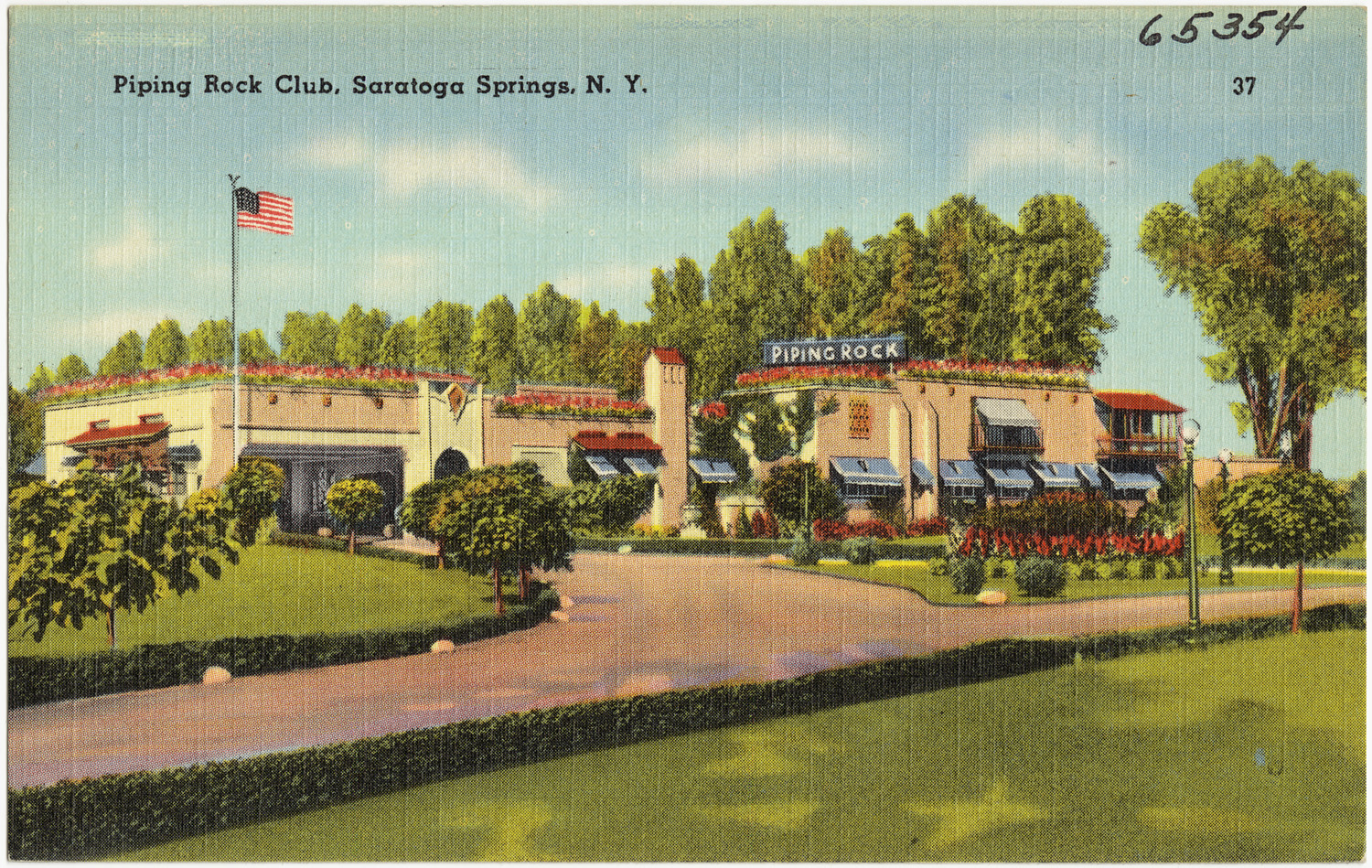
Piping Rock Club

The Piping Rock Club was located on the north side of Union Avenue near Saratoga Lake. Meyer Lansky, Frank Costello—operator of New York's Copacabana nightclub—and Joe Adonis opened the Piping Rock Club in the early 1930s. At one time, the Piping Rock Club had "12 roulette wheels, three craps tables, one card table and a bird cage. The Piping Rock burned in 1954 under suspicious circumstances.

=== Riley's Lake House ===
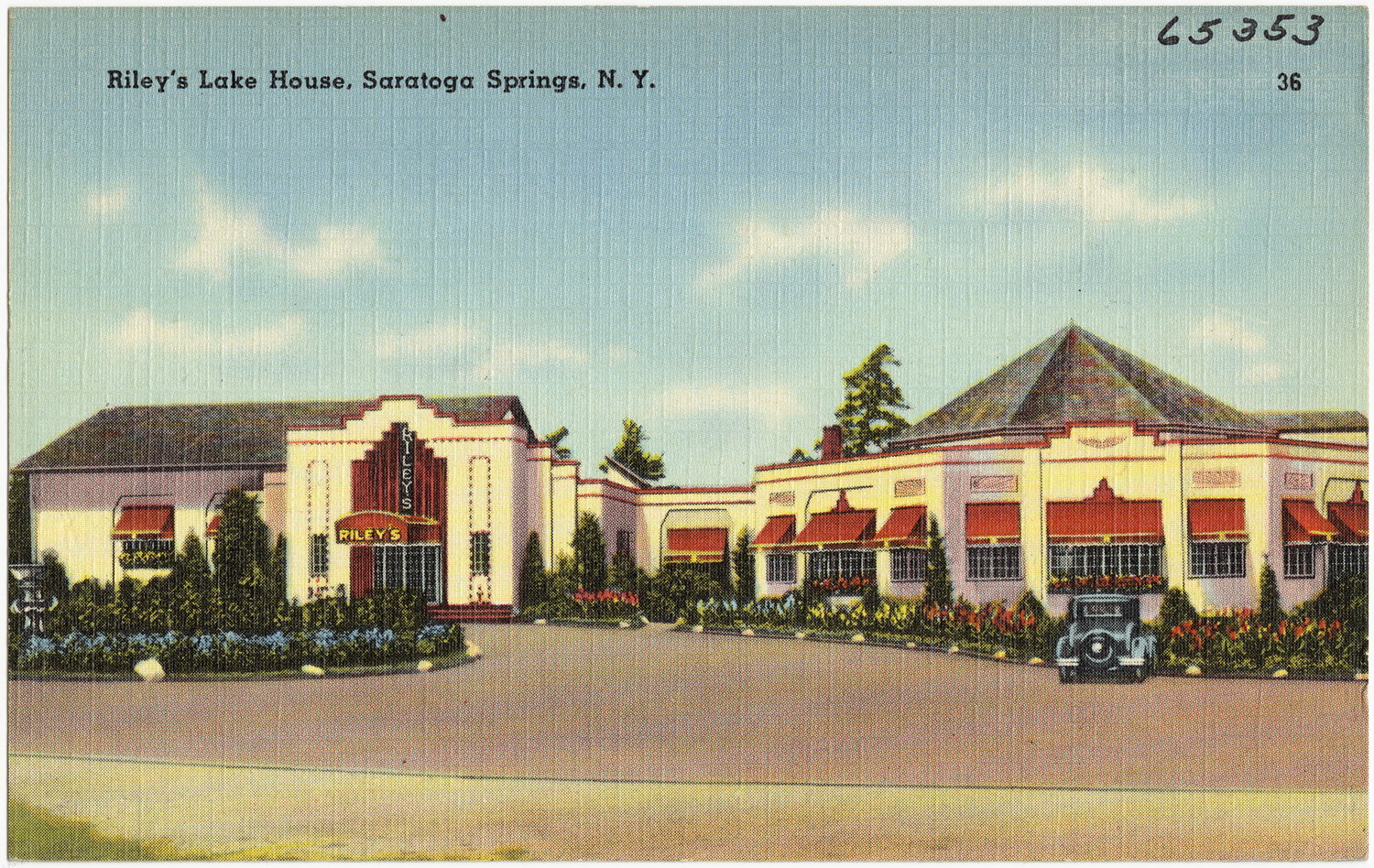
Riley's Lake House

Riley's was located on the south shore of Lake Lonely. It was originally opened in 1886 by James H. Riley, noted as a champion rower. In 1923, it was sold to Matthew J. "Matty" Dunn, a noted New York nightclub owner. In 1925, a raid found that Riley's had "nearly 100 tables, a large orchestra and thirty negro waiters." In 1931, Riley's burned and, in 1932, was sold to "Doc" Farone, who rebuilt it and renovated it in art deco style between 1934 and 1936. Dunn continued to lease Riley's until 1938. Riley's closed in 1942.

In August 1984, Riley's Lake House was reopened for one night for a benefit dinner-dance, An Evening in Old Saratoga, to benefit multiple-sclerosis research."

In 1996, the contents of Riley's Lake House were auctioned off and the building demolished.

=== Smith's Interlaken ===
The Interlaken opened in 1939. It sported a small lunch counter and a large casino. It went out of business and was auctioned off in August 1940 and burned in 1970.

== The end ==
In 1950 the Kefauver Committee initiated a campaign against organized crime and illegal gambling. The Committee hearings forced Saratoga Springs' city government to finally take action. In 1951 "Doc" Farone was indicted on gambling charges. In 1953, Gerard King, operator of Newman's Lake House, pleaded guilty to gambling and conspiracy charges. Meyer Lansky served a few months in Saratoga County Jail for gambling, his first jail sentence. Organized crime moved its gambling operations to Havana, Cuba, until the revolution, and later to Las Vegas.

The end of gambling spelled the end for the lake houses. In 1956, Frank Sullivan wrote in a piece for Sports Illustrated: "Sin being conspicuous by its absence at Saratoga these days, no ear, however delicately attuned, can detect the click of a roulette wheel."
