= White Sulphur Spring =

Coordinates: 42.9924°N 73.7367°W

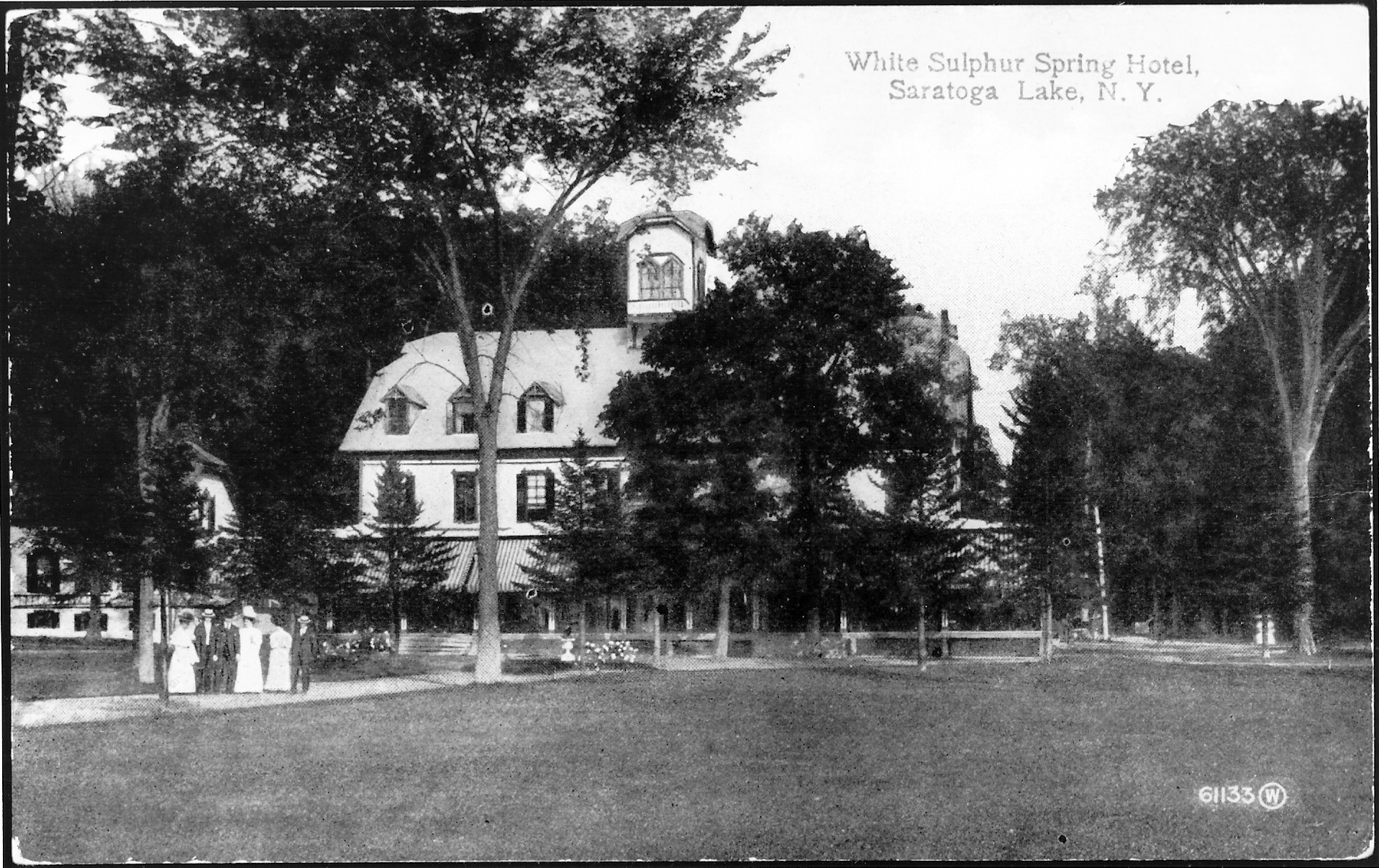
White Sulphur Spring Hotel, Saratoga Lake, NY

The White Sulphur Spring Hotel was a hotel located on the east (that is, south) end of Saratoga Lake in the town of Stillwater, New York. The exact date of construction is unsettled, but the consensus supports 1874. The hotel was built "presumably for the Boston & Hoosac Tunnel Railroad, which later became a branch of the Boston & Maine Railroad." The hotel was named after a spring on the property. There had previously been a hotel in the vicinity which burned prior to 1859.

About ten years later the hotel was leased by Thomas C. Luther, who purchased it in 1888 and whose family operated it until his death in 1937. In its heyday the hotel hosted "many famous celebrities of the early twentieth century—Lillian Russell, “Diamond Jim” Brady, Jack Dempsey, and wealthy financier Jay Gould among them." The facilities boasted a boxing ring used for training by Jack Dempsey, Gene Tunney, and Angel Firpo. The hotel was renowned for its "fish and game suppers."

Luther operated excursion boats on Saratoga Lake between the hotel and the "Trolley Park", later Kaydeross Park, and Moon's Lake House at the west (that is, north) end of the lake. The first boat was the Lady of the Lake, and the second was named the Alice, after his wife.

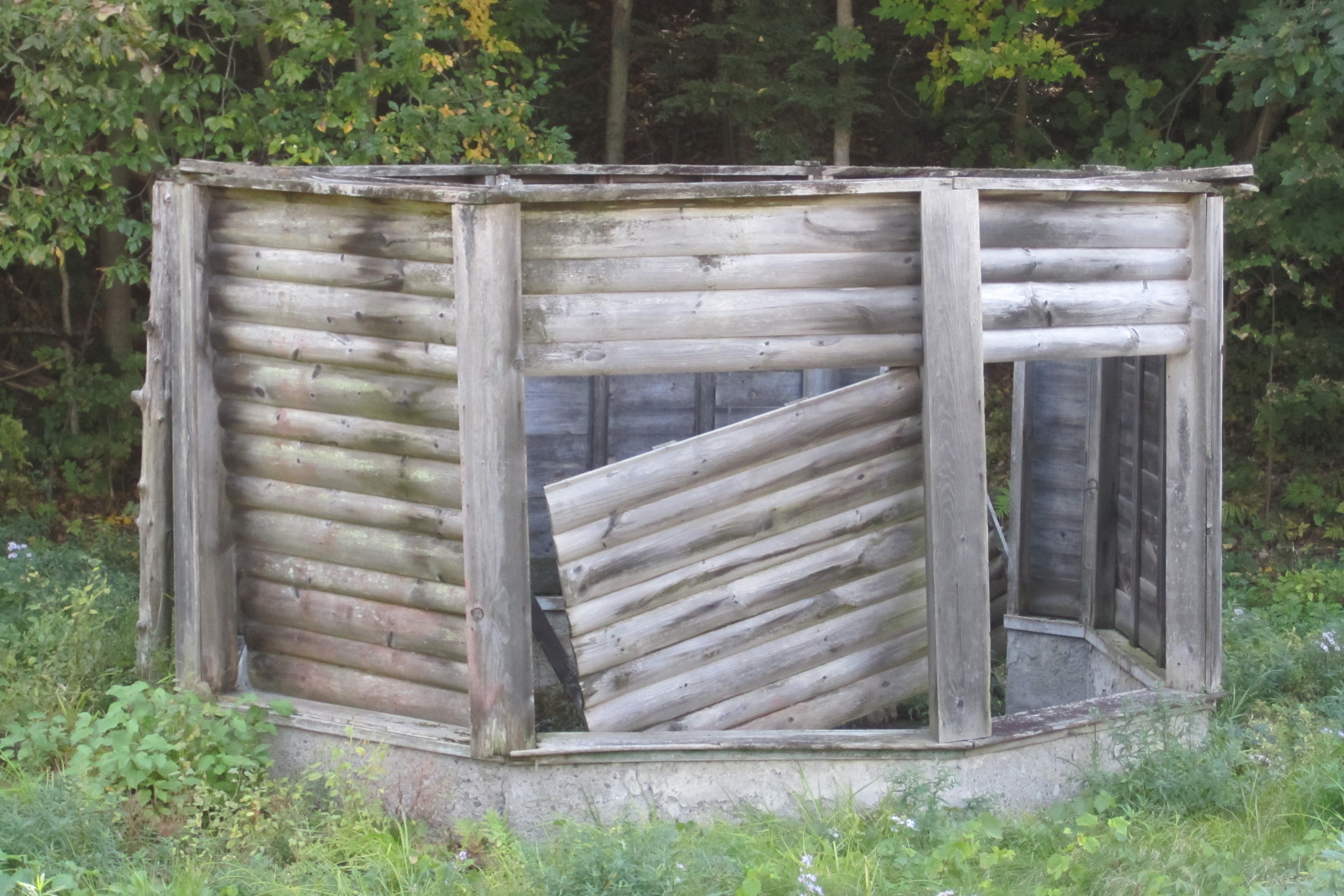
Ruins of spring house in 2012, White Sulphur Spring Hotel, Saratoga Lake, NY

Luther died in 1937 and the hotel was sold in 1940. It entered a period of decline, and was finally torn down in 1957 to facilitate the widening of New York State Route 9P. As of 2011 all that remains is the ruins of the spring house, but planning is underway to refurbish that as a pocket park.
