= SLSC =

SLSC may refer to:

- Surf Life Saving Club, volunteer institutions in Australia and New Zealand
- Saint Louis Science Center, science museum in St. Louis, Missouri
- South London Swimming Club, club in London, England
- Sri Lanka Signals Corps, combat support corps of the Sri Lanka army
- Saratoga Lake Sailing Club, located on Saratoga Lake in Ballston Spa, New York
