= New York State Route 423 =

State highway in Saratoga County, New York, US

New York State Route 423
- Map of Saratoga County in eastern New York with NY 423 highlighted in red

Route information
- Maintained by NYSDOT
- Length: 3.86 mi (6.21 km)
- Existed: c. 1931–present

Major junctions
- West end: NY 9P in Stillwater
- East end: NY 32 in Stillwater

Location
- Country: United States
- State: New York
- Counties: Saratoga

Highway system
- New York Highways; Interstate; US; State; Reference; Parkways
← NY 422	→ NY 424

New York State Route 423 (NY 423) is an east–west state highway located within the town of Stillwater in Saratoga County, New York, in the United States. It extends for 3.86 miles (6.21 km) from an intersection with NY 9P on the eastern shore of Saratoga Lake in the hamlet of Snake Hill to a junction with NY 32 southwest of Saratoga National Historic Park. The road was acquired by the state of New York in the early 1920s and designated as NY 423 in the early 1930s.

== Route description ==
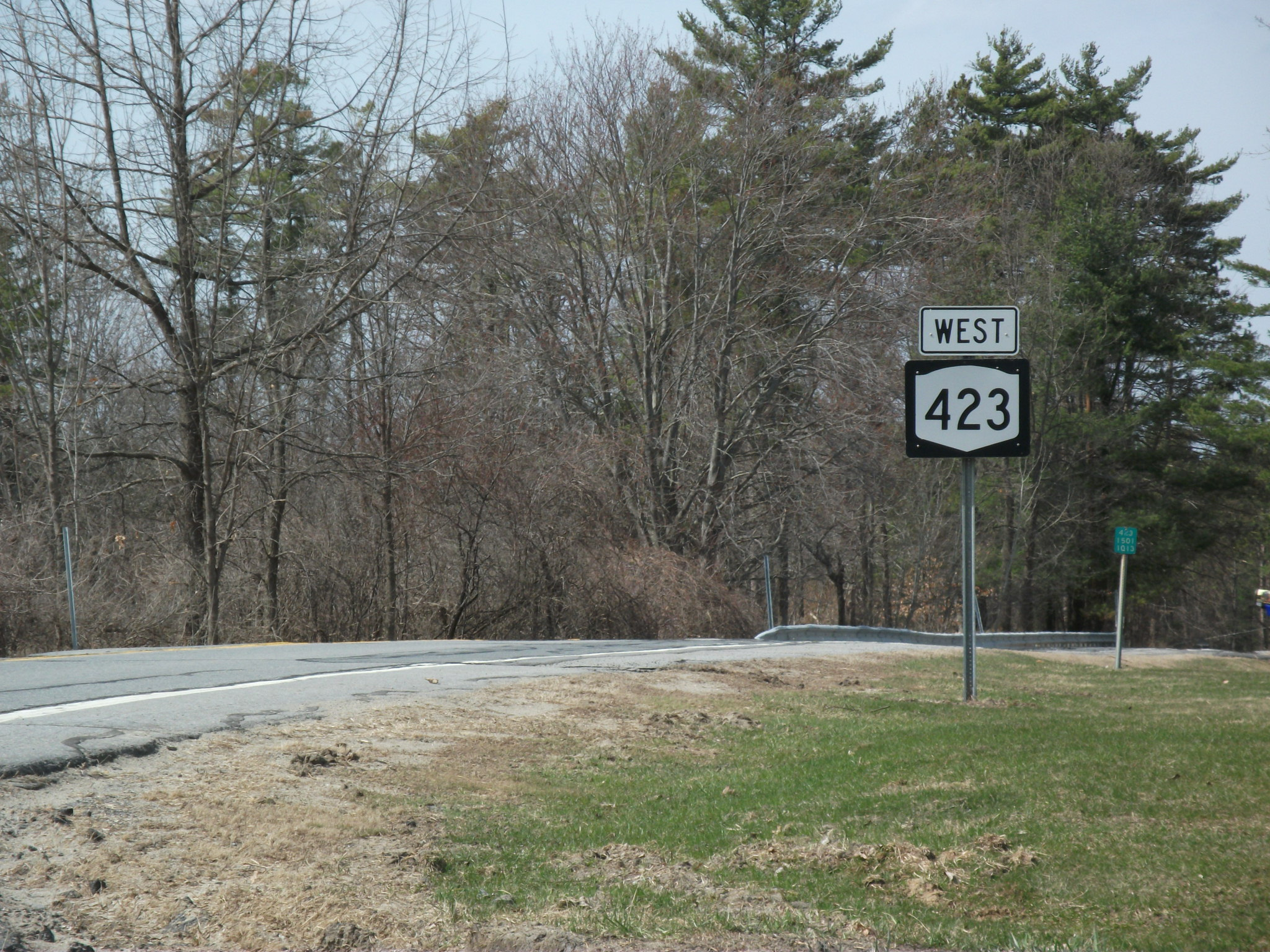
NY 423 westbound, proceeding away from NY 32 in Stillwater

NY 423 begins at a junction with NY 9P in the hamlet of Snake Hill, located on the eastern shores of Saratoga Lake in the town of Stillwater. The route proceeds southeastward as a two-lane highway, winding its way past a handful of homes built on the side of a valley surrounding the lake. The residential surroundings begin to taper off at the top of the valley's edge, where NY 423 meets the south end of County Route 70 (CR 70). From here, the highway turns slightly eastward, passing through a wooded, marshy area surrounding a small creek.

Past the marsh, NY 423 leaves the woods for a 2-mile (3.2 km) stretch of mostly open fields and a small number of isolated homes. It intersects several roads of local importance, including the northern terminus of CR 75, before it connects to NY 32 at an intersection adjacent to several farms. NY 423 ends here; however, its right-of-way continues east toward Bemis Heights as part of NY 32. Both directions of NY 32 lead to Saratoga National Historical Park, located just to the northeast of NY 423's eastern terminus.

== History ==
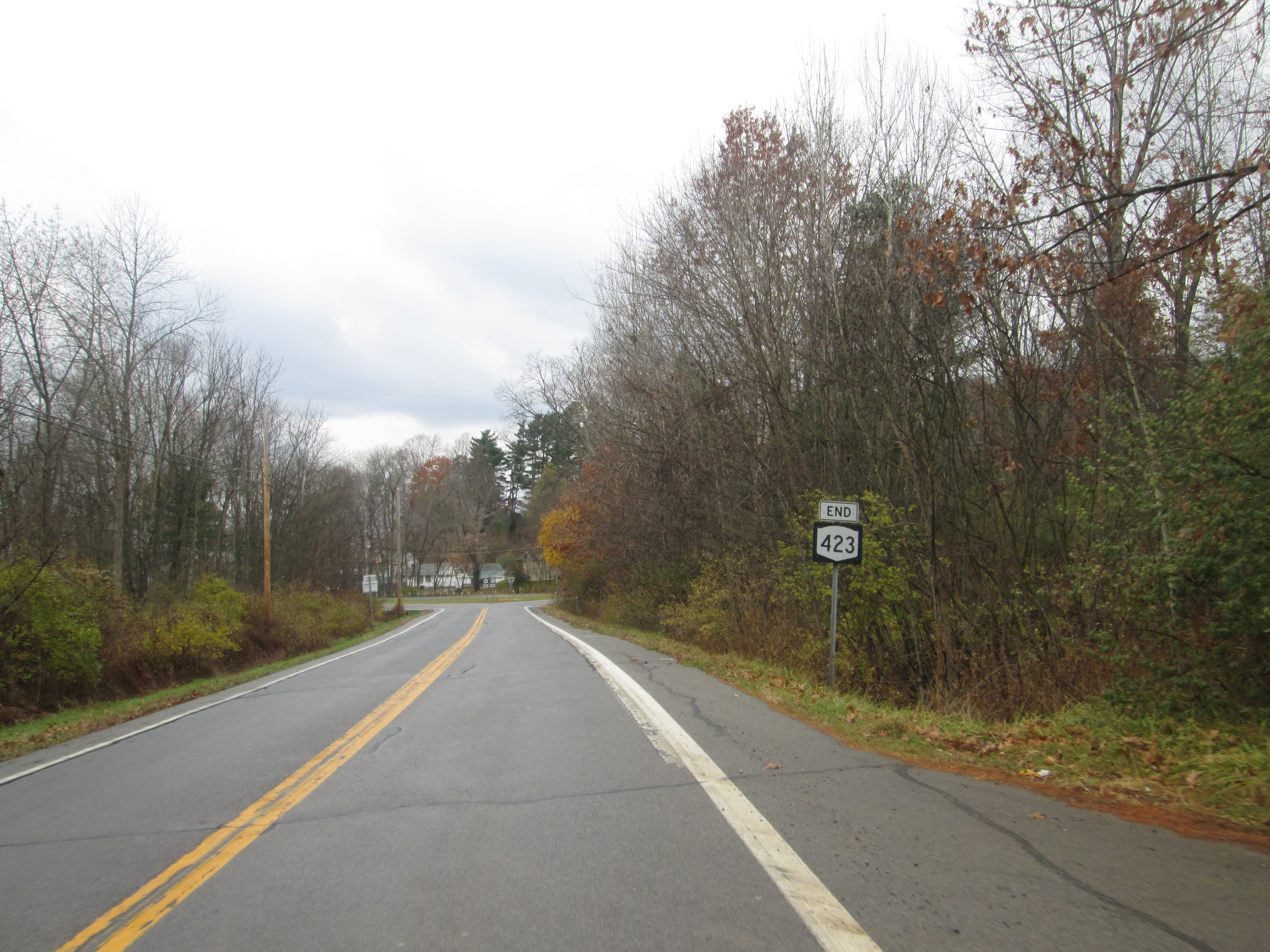
NY 423 approaching NY 9P in Stillwater

The east–west highway connecting Saratoga Lake to Saratoga National Historical Park was constructed at some point prior to the end of the 19th century. It was originally split into two sections linked by a short north–south piece of what is now CR 70. The road between Saratoga Lake and the historic site was taken over by the state of New York in the early 1920s, and the two intersections with modern CR 70 were reduced to a single junction by 1929 after a new direct connection was built between the two formerly separate east–west segments. In the 1930 renumbering of state highways in New York, state route designations were assigned to hundreds of state-maintained highways that were unnumbered at the time. NY 423 was assigned to the state road leading east from Saratoga Lake by the following year.

NY 32 originally cut through the grounds of Saratoga National Historical Park, following a direct route between Bemis Heights and the northern park boundary. As a result, NY 423 initially continued east for another 1 mile (1.6 km) along what is now NY 32 in order to reach the north–south route. A new highway bypassing the park to the west was completed c. 1963, connecting NY 423 to NY 32 north of the park limits. The new road became a realignment of NY 32 while NY 423 was truncated to its current length.

== Major intersections ==
The entire route is in Stillwater, Saratoga County.

mi	km	Destinations	Notes
0.00	0.00	NY 9P	Western terminus
3.86	6.21	NY 32 – Bemis Heights, Schuylerville	Eastern terminus
1.000 mi = 1.609 km; 1.000 km = 0.621 mi
