= Ira, Vermont =

- Town
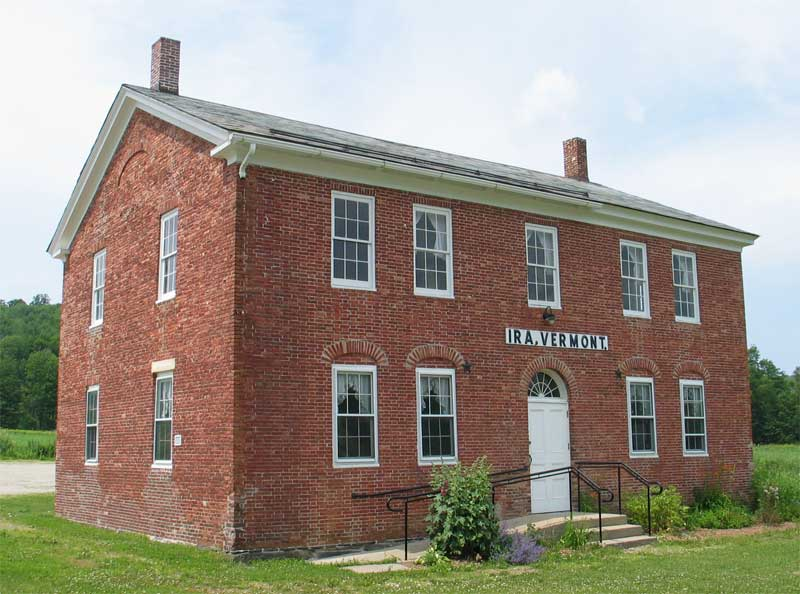
- Ira town hall

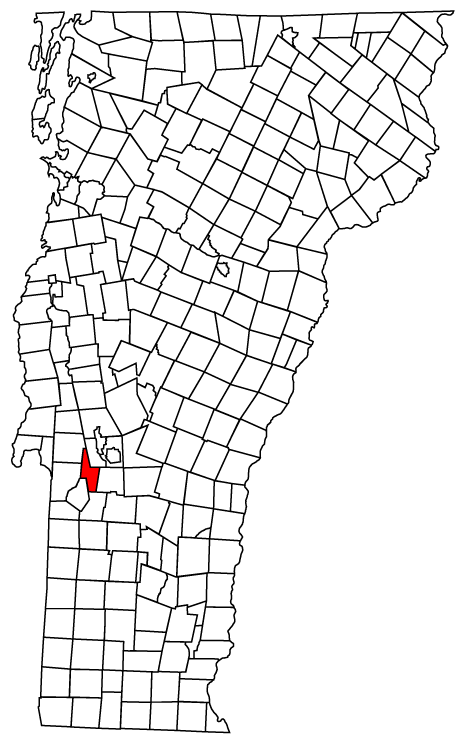
- Ira, Vermont
- Coordinates: 43°33′14″N 73°05′15″W
- Country: United States
- State: Vermont
- County: Rutland

Area
  - Total: 21.3 sq mi (55.2 km^{2})
  - Land: 21.3 sq mi (55.2 km^{2})
  - Water: 0 sq mi (0.0 km^{2})
- Elevation: 1,493 ft (455 m)

Population (2020)
  - Total: 368
  - Density: 17.3/sq mi (6.67/km^{2})
- Time zone: UTC-5 (Eastern (EST))
  - Summer (DST): UTC-4 (EDT)
- ZIP Codes: 05777 (West Rutland); 05735 (Castleton)
- Area code: 802
- FIPS code: 50-35425
- GNIS feature ID: 1462123
- Website: townofira.com

Ira is a town in Rutland County, Vermont, United States. The population was 368 at the 2020 census. It was named for Ira Allen, brother of Ethan Allen, who fought with the Green Mountain Boys of the Revolutionary War.

== Geography ==
According to the United States Census Bureau, the town has a total area of 21.3 square miles (55.2 km^{2}), all land.

== History ==
Following the Revolutionary War, veteran and historian Lemuel Roberts served as Captain of the Ira militia.

== Demographics ==
Historical population
Census	Pop.	Note	%±
1790	312		—
1800	473		51.6%
1810	519		9.7%
1820	498		−4.0%
1830	442		−11.2%
1840	430		−2.7%
1850	400		−7.0%
1860	422		5.5%
1870	413		−2.1%
1880	479		16.0%
1890	421		−12.1%
1900	350		−16.9%
1910	286		−18.3%
1920	295		3.1%
1930	287		−2.7%
1940	248		−13.6%
1950	232		−6.5%
1960	220		−5.2%
1970	284		29.1%
1980	354		24.6%
1990	426		20.3%
2000	455		6.8%
2010	432		−5.1%
2020	368		−14.8%
U.S. Decennial Census

As of the census of 2000, there were 455 people, 163 households, and 125 families residing in the town. The population density was 21.3 people per square mile (8.2/km^{2}). There were 192 housing units at an average density of 9.0 per square mile (3.5/km^{2}). The racial makeup of the town was 99.78% White and 0.22% Asian.

There were 163 households, out of which 40.5% had children under the age of 18 living with them, 63.2% were married couples living together, 9.2% had a female householder with no husband present, and 22.7% were non-families. 18.4% of all households were made up of individuals, and 6.1% had someone living alone who was 65 years of age or older. The average household size was 2.79 and the average family size was 3.18.

In the town, the population was spread out, with 29.5% under the age of 18, 8.1% from 18 to 24, 28.1% from 25 to 44, 25.9% from 45 to 64, and 8.4% who were 65 years of age or older. The median age was 38 years. For every 100 females, there were 85.0 males. For every 100 females age 18 and over, there were 88.8 males.

The median income for a household in the town was $46,875, and the median income for a family was $51,375. Males had a median income of $31,500 versus $26,042 for females. The per capita income for the town was $16,756. About 6.5% of families and 10.4% of the population were below the poverty line, including 19.7% of those under age 18 and none of those age 65 or over.
