= George Speck =

American chef (1824–1914)

George Crum
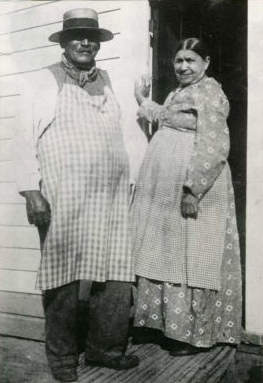
- George Speck with his sister Catherine "Aunt Kate" Wicks
- Born: George Speck; July 15, 1824; Saratoga County, New York, U.S.
- Died: July 22, 1914 (aged 90); Malta, New York, U.S.
- Occupation: Chef
- Parent(s): Abraham Speck, Diana Tull

George Speck (also known as George Crum; July 15, 1824 – July 22, 1914) was an American chef.

Speck was born in Saratoga County, New York. He was a member of the Mohawk people. He worked as a hunter, guide and cook in the Adirondack Mountains, becoming noted for his culinary skills after being hired at Moon's Lake House near Saratoga Springs. His specialties included wild meat, especially venison and duck. Speck later left Moon's and opened his own restaurant, Crum's, in nearby Malta. His establishment was popular among wealthy tourists and his reputation spread outside the Adirondacks.

Speck was known for serving thinly sliced fried potatoes at his restaurants, which subsequently became known as "Saratoga chips". The first published recipes for potato chips date from the early 19th century, decades before his career as a chef. However, after Speck's death various newspaper articles and local histories of Saratoga County began to claim him as the "inventor" of potato chips. This myth featured in national advertising campaigns in the 1970s. More detailed versions include claims that he invented potato chips by accident or to appease a difficult customer, often cited as Cornelius Vanderbilt; some accounts also claim that the true inventor was Speck's sister Catherine Wicks.

== Early life ==
Speck was born on July 15, 1824 in Saratoga County in upstate New York. Speck was of African American heritage, he and his sister Catherine Wicks "both identified as members of the St. Regis Mohawk tribe." George Speck did not have the opportunity to go to school and was deprived of proper education.

== Early career ==
Speck developed his culinary skills at Cary Moon's Lake House on Saratoga Lake, noted as an expensive restaurant at a time when wealthy families from Manhattan and other areas were building summer "camps" in the area. Speck and his sister, Wicks, also cooked at the Sans Souci in Ballston Spa, alongside another St. Regis Mohawk Indian known for his skills as a guide and cook, Pete Francis. One of the regular customers at Moon's was shipping tycoon Cornelius Vanderbilt, who, although he savored the food, could never seem to remember Speck's name. On one occasion, he called a waiter over to ask, "Crum, how long before we shall eat?" Rather than take offense, Speck decided to embrace the nickname, figuring that, "A crumb is bigger than a speck."

By 1860, Speck had opened his own restaurant, called Crum's, on Storey Hill in nearby Malta, New York. His cuisine was in high demand among Saratoga Springs' tourists and elites: "His prices were…those of the fashionable New York restaurants, but his food and service were worth it…Everything possible was raised on his own small farm, and that, too, got his personal attention whenever he could arrange it." According to popular accounts, he was said to include a basket of chips on every table. One contemporaneous source recalls that in his restaurant, Speck was unquestionably the man in charge: "His rules of procedure were his own. They were very strict, and being an Indian, he never departed from them. In the slang of the racecourse, he "played no favorites." Guests were obliged to wait their turn, the millionaire as well as the wage-earner. Mr. Vanderbilt once was obliged to wait an hour and a half for a meal...With none but rich pleasure-seekers as his guests, Speck kept his tables laden with the best of everything, and for it all charged Delmonico prices."

== Potato chip ==
After his death, a local legend developed which credited Speck with the invention of potato chips. However, according to Snopes, he "never made the claim that he had invented the potato chip, let alone claimed the tale as his own – those assertions emerged only many years after his death."

Recipes for frying potato slices were published in several cookbooks in the 19th century. William Kitchiner's The Cook's Oracle (1817) included techniques for such a dish, though specified to "slice them about a quarter of an inch thick". N. K. M. Lee's cookbook, The Cook's Own Book (1832), has a recipe that is very similar to Kitchiner's, also calling to "slice them about a quarter of an inch thick, or cut them in shavings round and round, as you would peel a lemon".

The New York Tribune ran a feature article on "Crum's: The Famous Eating House on Saratoga Lake" in December 1891, but mentioned nothing about potato chips. Neither did Crum's commissioned biography, published in 1893, nor did one 1914 obituary in a local paper. Another obituary states, "Crum is said to have been the actual inventor of "Saratoga chips."" When Catherine Wicks died in 1924, however, her obituary authoritatively identified her as follows: "A sister of George Crum, Mrs. Catherine Wicks, died at the age of 102 and was the cook at Moon's Lake House. She first invented and fried the famous Saratoga Chips." Some historical accounts suggest that neither Speck nor Wicks was the sole inventor of the potato chip. A July 1849 article in the New York Herald about Moon's Lake House mentioned, "Eliza, the cook," noting that her "potato frying reputation is one of the prominent matters of remark at Saratoga." The article further stated, "Who would think that simple potatoes could be made such a luxury!"

Wicks recalled the invention of Saratoga Chips as an accident: she had "chipped off a piece of the potato which, by the merest accident, fell into the pan of fat. She fished it out with a fork and set it down upon a plate beside her on the table." Her brother tasted it, declared it good, and said, "We'll have plenty of these." In a 1932 interview with The Saratogian newspaper, her grandson, John Gilbert Freeman, asserted Wicks's role as the true inventor of the potato chip.

Hugh Bradley's 1940 history of Saratoga contains some information about Speck, based on local folklore as much as on any specific historical primary sources. In their 1983 article in Western Folklore, Fox and Banner say that Bradley had cited an 1885 article in the Hotel Gazette about Speck and the potato chips. Bradley repeated some material from that article, including that "Crum was born in 1828, the son of Abe Speck, a mulatto jockey who had come from Kentucky to Saratoga Springs and married a Stockbridge Indian woman," and that "Crum also claimed to have considerable German and Spanish blood."

In any event, Speck helped popularize the potato chip, first as a cook at Moon's and then in his own place. Cary Moon, owner of Moon's Lake House, later rushed to claim credit for the invention, and began mass-producing the chips, first served in paper cones, then packaged in boxes. They became wildly popular: "It was at Moon's that Clio first tasted the famous Saratoga chips, said to have originated there, and it was she who first scandalized spa society by strolling along Broadway and about the paddock at the race track crunching the crisp circlets out of a paper sack as though they were candy or peanuts. She made it the fashion, and soon you saw all Saratoga dipping into cornucopias filled with golden-brown paper-thin potatoes; a gathered crowd was likely to create a sound like a scuffling through dried autumn leaves." Visitors to Saratoga Springs were advised to take the 10-mile journey around the lake to Moon's if only for the chips: "the hobby of the Lake House is Fried Potatoes, and these they serve in good style. They are sold in papers like confectionery."

A 1973 advertising campaign by the St. Regis Paper Company, which manufactured packaging for chips, featured an ad for Speck and his story, published in the national magazines, Fortune and Time. During the late 1970s, the variant of the story featuring Vanderbilt became popular because of the interest in his wealth and name, and evidence suggests the source was an advertising agency for the Potato Chip/Snack Food Association.

A 1983 article in Western Folklore identifies potato chips as having originated in Saratoga Springs, New York, while critiquing the variants of popular stories. In all versions, the chips became popular and subsequently known as "Saratoga chips" or "potato crunches".

In 2000, Snopes website writes that Crum's customer, if he existed, was more likely an obscure one. Vanderbilt was indeed a regular customer at both Crum's Malta restaurant and Moon's Lake House, but there is no evidence that he played a role by requesting or promoting potato chips.
