= Lemuel Roberts =

Soldier and historian

- Born: 3 May 1752; Canaan, Connecticut
- Died: after 1810; East Franklin, Vermont
- Military career
- Allegiance: United States of America
- Branch: Massachusetts Line
- Service years: 1775–1778
- Rank: Captain (land)
- Conflicts: Siege of Boston; Battle of Quebec (1775); Battles of Saratoga

Lemuel Roberts was a soldier and historian of the American Revolutionary War.

== Youth ==
Lemuel Roberts was born 1751 in Canaan, Connecticut, to Lemuel Roberts and Lydia (Purchase) Roberts. He moved with his family to Stillwater at the age of 10. He left home in 1768 to manufacture staves with a brother on Grand Isle in Lake Champlain. The following year he helped his father clear a farm in Charlemont, Massachusetts.

== Revolutionary War ==
In 1775 Roberts marched to Cambridge, Massachusetts with Captain Avery in response to the Battles of Lexington and Concord. At Cambridge he enlisted for 8 months with Captain Maxfield. On 1 June 1775 he marched to Chelsea with the 18th Massachusetts Bay Provincial Regiment commanded by Colonel Ephraim Doolittle, and participated in the Siege of Boston until discharged.

On 19 January 1776 Roberts enlisted for one year in Captain Thomas Alexander's company of Colonel Elisha Porter's Regiment of the Massachusetts Line. He marched to Quebec in April, 1776, where he contracted smallpox during the retreat to Fort Crown Point in May. He marched south with his regiment through Albany, New York, to Morristown, New Jersey, in December, 1776. Roberts skirmished with British loyalist units in New Jersey en route home to Massachusetts following his discharge on 1 January 1777.

Roberts enlisted for six weeks with Captain Samuel Taylor's company and marched to Fort Miller, New York, during the Siege of Fort Ticonderoga (1777). Roberts joined Captain Ebenezer Allen's company of Colonel Herrick's battalion of rangers following the Battle of Bennington. Roberts became an assistant to Colonel Herrick through the Battles of Saratoga; because Allen was unable to offer him compensation.

Colonel Herrick commissioned Roberts a lieutenant for a scouting expedition on 12 January 1778 to determine the status of British loyalist positions on Lake Champlain. The 4-man scouting party was captured later that month near Saint Albans, Vermont; and imprisoned in the Quebec City. Roberts escaped captivity for a few days in March, 1778, and again for a few weeks that summer, and finally reached Fort Ticonderoga after a third escape in October.

== Later life ==
Lemuel Roberts married Sarah Collins in Rutland on 14 March 1781. In 1784, he was captain of the militia of Ira, Vermont. Roberts published memoirs in 1809 of his experiences from 1751 to 1778. Those memoirs have been reprinted by the New York Times and by Arno Press as one of the few first hand accounts of soldiers of the American Revolutionary War. He is believed to have died in Vermont about 1813.
