= New York State Route 9P =

State highway in Saratoga County, New York, US

New York State Route 9P
- Map of Saratoga County in eastern New York with NY 9P highlighted in red

Route information
- Auxiliary route of US 9
- Maintained by NYSDOT and the city of Saratoga Springs
- Length: 12.13 mi (19.52 km)
- Existed: April 1935–present

Major junctions
- South end: US 9 in Malta
- I-87 in Saratoga Springs
- North end: US 9 / NY 50 in Saratoga Springs

Location
- Country: United States
- State: New York
- Counties: Saratoga

Highway system
- New York Highways; Interstate; US; State; Reference; Parkways
← NY 9N	→ NY 9R

New York State Route 9P (NY 9P) is a state highway in central Saratoga County, New York, in the United States. It is an alternate route off U.S. Route 9 between Malta and Saratoga Springs that connects US 9 to the eastern shore of Saratoga Lake. NY 9P meets NY 423 in the town of Stillwater and Interstate 87 in Saratoga Springs. In its final mile, NY 9P serves the Saratoga Race Course.

== Route description ==
NY 9P begins at an intersection with US 9 in Malta. NY 9P proceeds eastward from US 9 as a two-lane residential street through Malta, passing the Bass Manor Museum. The route bends northeastward and soon southward along the shore of Saratoga Lake. At Saratoga Lake, NY 9P intersects with CR 108 (Plains Road) before heading southeast and away from the shore. As the route makes a bend to the north, CR 76 (Lake Road) intersects near the Saratoga Lake Golf Course. At this point, NY 9P becomes a lakeside highway on the eastern side of the lake, passing a long stretch of residences and an intersection with NY 423. After NY 423, NY 9P bends northeastward alongside the lake, now in the town of Stillwater and soon the town of Saratoga.

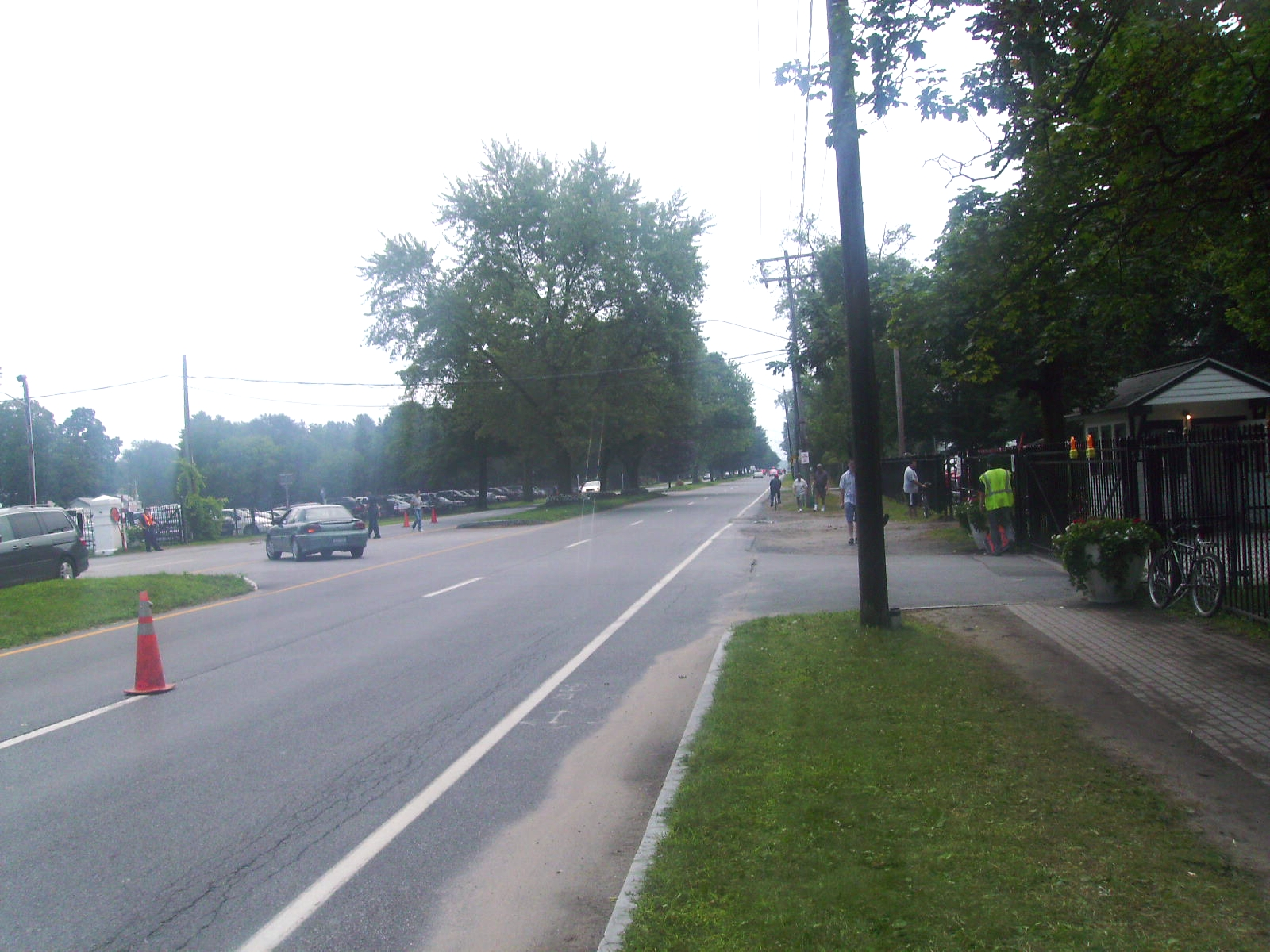
NY 9P southbound at Saratoga Race Course in Saratoga Springs

North of the hamlet of Maple Shade, NY 9P intersects with the western terminus of CR 71 (Cedars Bluff Road). Along the lakeside, NY 9P bends westward, soon bending away from the lake at Point Breeze, where the road crosses over the northern end of the lake on the Saratoga County Veterans Memorial Bridge, which was reconstructed in 2011. From this point to Circular Street, NY 9P is named Union Avenue. Past the lake, NY 9P enters the city of Saratoga Springs, where it intersects the terminus of CR 22 (Crescent Avenue) and CR 66 (Dyer Switch Road). NY 9P turns to the northwest, passing the Saratoga National Golf Club before the terminus of CR 65 (Meadowbrook Road). Turning westward, NY 9P enters interchange 14 with the Adirondack Northway (I-87) and passing Yaddo Gardens. After the gardens, the route passes the Saratoga Race Course and enters a section of downtown Saratoga Springs designated as the Union Avenue Historic District.

Within the historic district, NY 9P serves a number of stately Victorian homes built in the second half of the 19th and early 20th centuries, as well as buildings owned by Empire State College, some of which were once Skidmore College Buildings. Union Avenue terminates at Circular Street, which abuts the eastern border of Congress Park. From here, NY 9P continues north on Circular Street before turning west on Spring Street a short distance after. The route continues along the north side of Congress Park for three blocks before ending at an intersection with US 9 and NY 50 (Broadway).

== History ==
An alternate route of U.S. Route 9 between Malta and Saratoga Springs by way of the eastern shore of Saratoga Lake was originally assigned NY 9X c. 1931. In December 1934, an alternate route of US 9 in New York City was designated as U.S. Route 9X. The alphanumerical duplication between the two routes was eliminated in April 1935 when NY 9X was redesignated as NY 9P.

== Major intersections ==
The entire route is in Saratoga County.

Location	mi	km	Destinations	Notes
Malta	0.00	0.00	US 9 – Albany, Saratoga Springs	Southern terminus
Town of Stillwater	4.10	6.60	NY 423 east – Bemis Heights, Saratoga Park	Western terminus of NY 423
Saratoga Springs	10.15	16.33	I-87 / NY 9P Truck north	Exit 14 on I-87 / Northway; southern terminus of NY 9P Truck
Saratoga Springs			To NY 29 via Henning Road	
Saratoga Springs	12.13	19.52	US 9 / NY 50	Northern terminus
1.000 mi = 1.609 km; 1.000 km = 0.621 mi

== NY 9P Truck ==
New York State Route 9P Truck
- Location: Saratoga Springs
- Length: 3.4 mi (5.5 km)
- Existed: 2015–present

New York State Route 9P Truck is a truck route bypassing NY 9P in Downtown Saratoga Springs. The route begins at NY 9P's interchange with the Adirondack Northway (I-87) at exit 14, continuing north to exit 15 and then west along NY 50, which is also cosigned as NY 29 Truck. The truck route terminates at an intersection with US 9, which continues westward with NY 50 and NY 29 Truck towards Downtown Saratoga. The route was created sometime around 2015.

Major intersections

The entire route is in Saratoga Springs, Saratoga County.

mi	km	Exit	Destinations	Notes
0.0	0.0		NY 9P – Saratoga Lake, Saratoga Springs	Southern terminus
0.4	0.64	14	I-87 south – Albany	Southern terminus of concurrency with I-87
2.0	3.2	15	I-87 north – Montreal	Northern terminus of concurrency with I-87
2.3	3.7		NY 50 north / NY 29 Truck east – Gansevoort	Southern terminus of concurrency with NY 50 / NY 29 Truck
3.4	5.5		US 9 / NY 50 south / NY 29 Truck west to NY 9N – Ballston Spa, Glens Falls	Northern terminus; northern terminus of concurrency with NY 50 / NY 29 Truck
1.000 mi = 1.609 km; 1.000 km = 0.621 mi
