= Stillwater, New York =

Stillwater
- Town
- Town of Stillwater
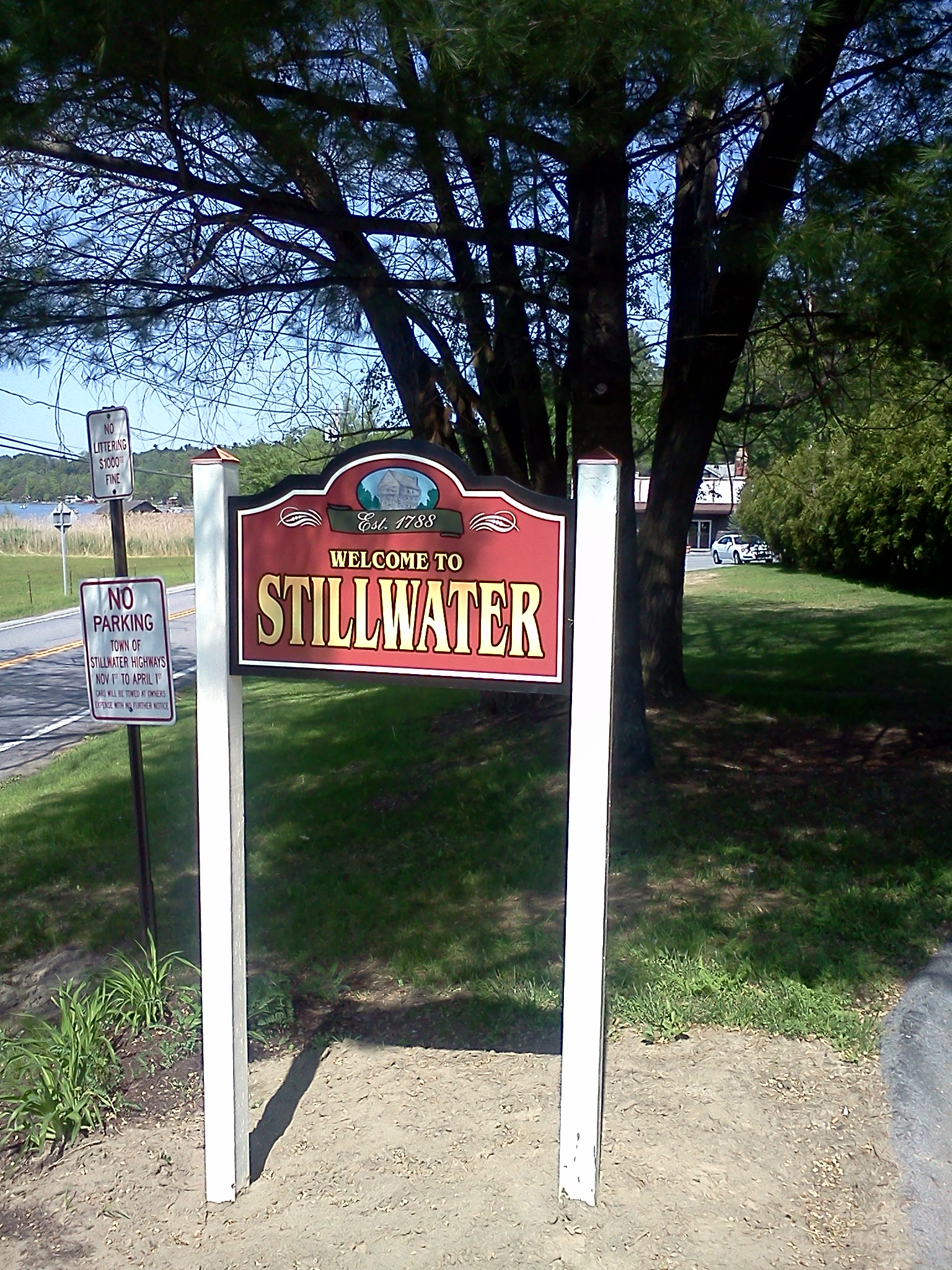
- Welcome to Stillwater sign

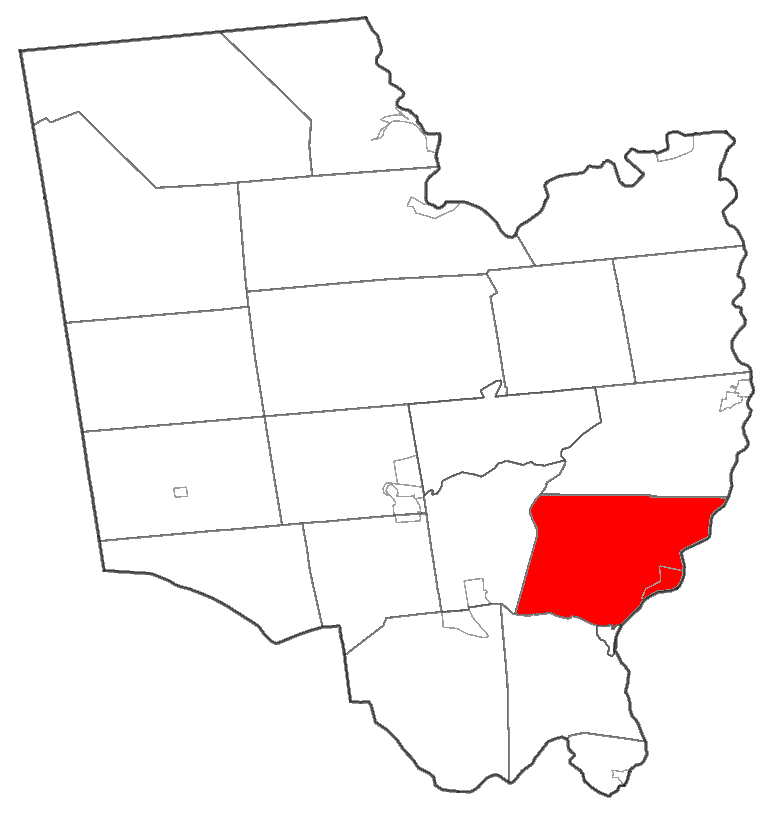
- Location of Stillwater within Saratoga County

- Location of Stillwater in New York
- Coordinates: 42°58′N 73°41′W
- Country: United States
- State: New York
- County: Saratoga
- Established: 1791

Area
  - Total: 43.58 sq mi (112.86 km^{2})
  - Land: 41.19 sq mi (106.68 km^{2})
  - Water: 2.38 sq mi (6.17 km^{2})

Population (2020)
  - Total: 9,022
  - Density: 219.0/sq mi (84.57/km^{2})
- FIPS code: 36-091-71333
- Website: Town website

Stillwater is a town in Saratoga County, New York, United States, with a population of 9,022 at the 2020 census. The town contains a village called Stillwater. The town is at the eastern border of the county, southeast of Saratoga Springs and borders both Rensselaer and Washington counties. Saratoga National Historical Park is located within the town's limits. There is a hamlet in Minerva, Essex County, New York, with the same name which has nothing to do with this town.

== History ==
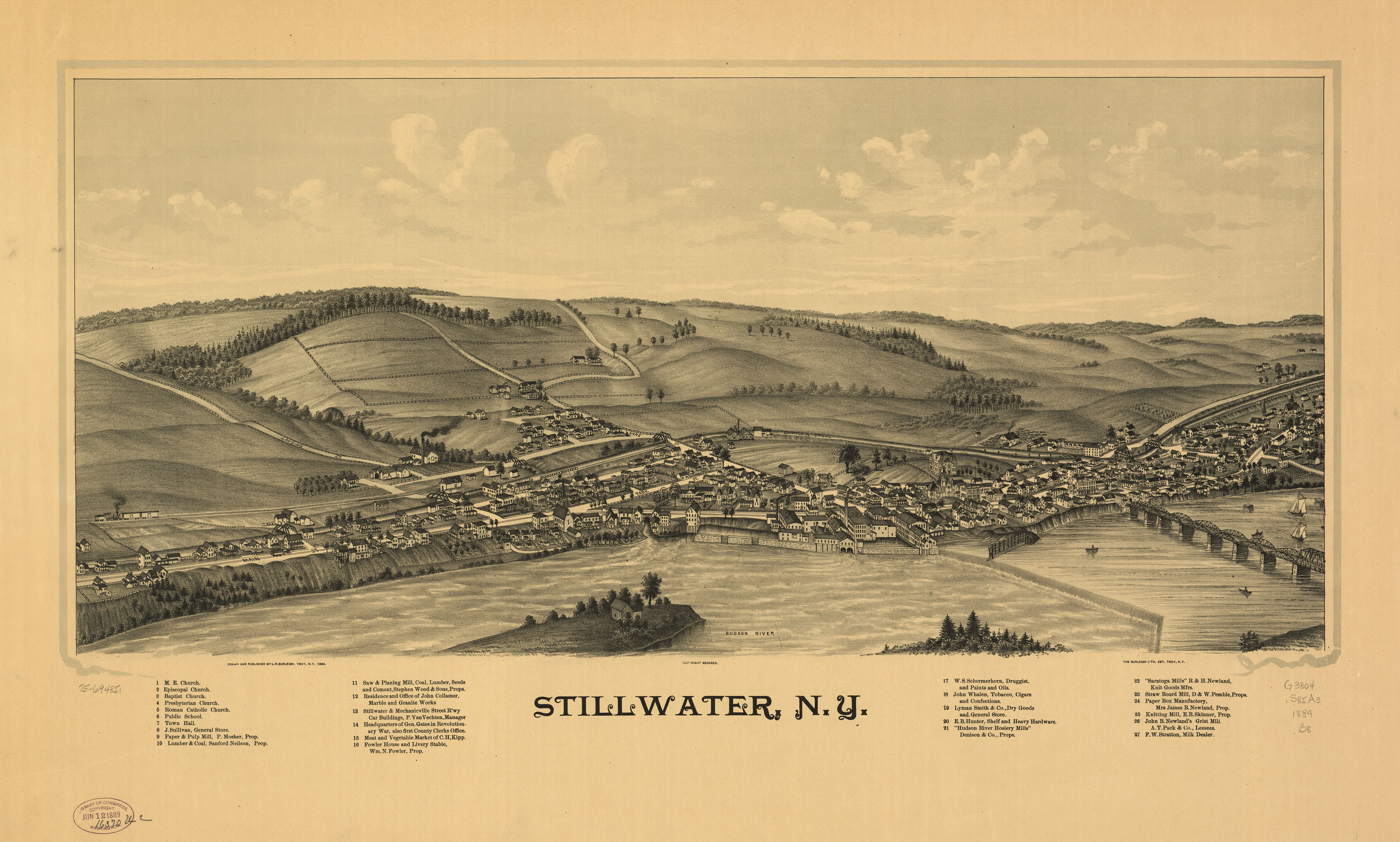
Perspective map of Stillwater from 1889 by L.R. Burleigh with list of landmarks

The area was occupied by Iroquois and Mahican natives when the colonial period began. In 1709, Peter Schuyler built Fort Ingoldsby in town because of its location on the frontier of the French and Indian Wars. A replica of Schuyler's fort currently serves as the Stillwater Blockhouse Museum. Settlers began arriving after 1730. During the American Revolution residents participated in the war, and part of the Battle of Saratoga was fought in the town so that the town now refers to itself as the turning point of the American Revolution.

Stillwater was established as a town in 1791, when Saratoga County was formed. In 1816, the hamlet of Stillwater incorporated as a village. In 1859, Mechanicville became the town's second village. The Stillwater Free Library was established in 1949 by Barbara Alexik and Elizabeth Beiter in the building formerly home to the St. John's Episcopal Church. The Stillwater United Church was listed on the National Register of Historic Places in 2006.

== Geography ==
According to the United States Census Bureau, the town has a total area of 43.6 square miles (112.8 km^{2}), of which 41.4 square miles (107.1 km^{2}) is land and 2.2 square miles (5.7 km^{2}) (5.07%) is water.

The eastern town line is the border of Rensselaer County and Washington County, marked by the Hudson River.

U.S. Route 4, partly conjoined with New York State Route 32 follows the Hudson River through the town. New York State Route 423 is an east-west highway in the northern part of Stillwater. New York State Route 9P is a north-south highway in the northwestern part of the town by Saratoga Lake. New York State Route 67 runs along the southern town line.

== Demographics ==
Historical population
Census	Pop.	Note	%±
1820	2,821		—
1830	2,601		−7.8%
1840	2,733		5.1%
1850	2,967		8.6%
1860	3,238		9.1%
1870	3,401		5.0%
1880	3,412		0.3%
1890	3,868		13.4%
1900	4,989		29.0%
1910	5,955		19.4%
1920	3,882		−34.8%
1930	3,942		1.5%
1940	3,709		−5.9%
1950	4,055		9.3%
1960	4,416		8.9%
1970	5,023		13.7%
1980	6,316		25.7%
1990	7,233		14.5%
2000	7,522		4.0%
2010	8,287		10.2%
2020	9,022		8.9%
U.S. Decennial Census

At the 2000 census, there were 7,522 people, 2,786 households and 2,109 families residing in the town. The population density was 181.9 inhabitants per square mile (70.2/km^{2}). There were 3,054 housing units at an average density of 73.8 per square mile (28.5/km^{2}). The racial makeup of the town was 98.21% White, 0.41% Black or African American, 0.11% Native American, 0.47% Asian, 0.01% Pacific Islander, 0.11% from other races, and 0.69% from two or more races. Hispanic or Latino of any race were 0.62% of the population.

There were 2,786 households, of which 38.0% had children under the age of 18 living with them, 60.7% were married couples living together, 10.0% had a female householder with no husband present, and 24.3% were non-families. 19.5% of all households were made up of individuals, and 7.7% had someone living alone who was 65 years of age or older. The average household size was 2.70 and the average family size was 3.10.

27.0% of the population were under the age of 18, 6.9% from 18 to 24, 31.9% from 25 to 44, 23.5% from 45 to 64, and 10.7% who were 65 years of age or older. The median age was 36 years. For every 100 females, there were 99.8 males. For every 100 females age 18 and over, there were 96.8 males.

The median household income was $47,579 and the median family income was $53,023. Males had a median income of $37,428 and females $27,257. The per capita income was $19,291. About 5.3% of families and 6.7% of the population were below the poverty line, including 8.6% of those under age 18 and 11.3% of those age 65 or over.

== Education ==
Students attend school at Stillwater High School. The school is located in the village of Stillwater and serves grades K to 12 in two buildings.

== Notable people ==
- Winchel Bacon, Wisconsin legislator
- Charles H. Baxter, Wisconsin State Senator
- Abigail Fillmore (1798–1853), First Lady of the United States, wife of Millard Fillmore
- Ebenezer O. Grosvenor (1820–1910), lieutenant governor and state treasurer of Michigan
- Lemuel Roberts, American Revolutionary War soldier and historian lived in Stillwater as a boy in the 1760s.

== Communities and locations in the Town of Stillwater ==
- Bemis Heights – A hamlet by the Hudson River, north of Stillwater village on US-4.
- Brown's Beach – A hamlet in the northwestern part of the town, by the south end of Saratoga Lake on NY-9P.
- East Saratoga Junction – A location in the southern section of the town.
- Ketchums Corners – A historic location in the northwestern part of the town, near Saratoga Lake.
- Saratoga National Historical Park - A historic park in the northeastern part of the town.
- Snake Hill – A hamlet in the northern part of the town near Saratoga Lake on NY-9P.
- Stillwater – A village located by the Hudson River and US-4.
- Stillwater Junction – A hamlet in the southeastern part of the town on County Road 75.
- Wayville – A hamlet by the northern town line on County Road 70.
- Willow Glen – A hamlet by the southern town boundary on NY-67.

== See also ==
- Battle of Saratoga
