= Moon's Lake House =

Former restaurant in Saratoga Springs, New York

Coordinates: 43.0559121°N 73.7294648°W

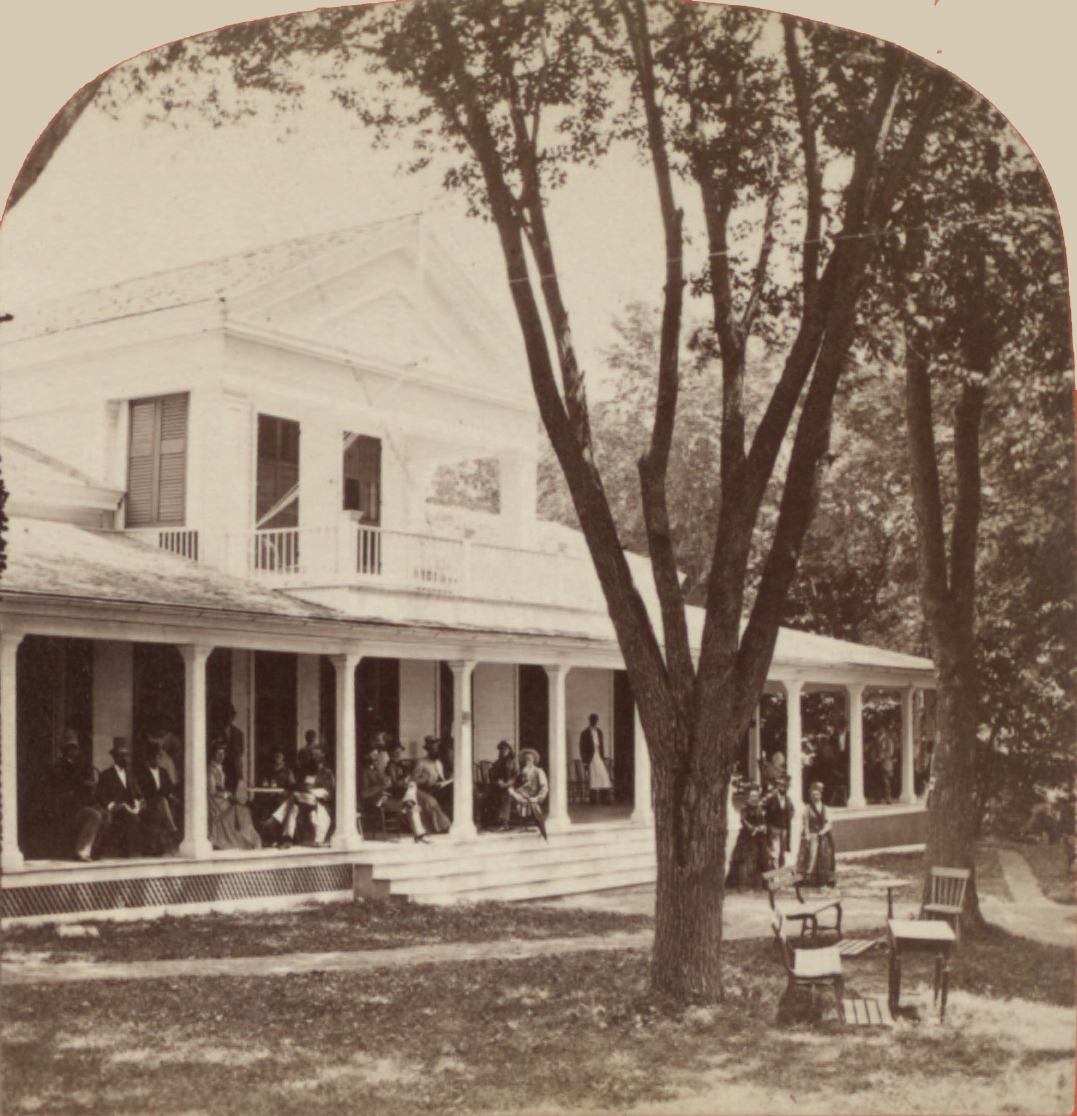
Moon's Lake House from an 1896 stereopticon slide

Moon's Lake House was a restaurant on Saratoga Lake in Saratoga Springs, New York.

According to local legend, the creation of the potato chip was associated with this restaurant. The legend holds that Cornelius Vanderbilt was visiting the restaurant in 1853, he was unsatisfied with the texture of the fried potatoes he had ordered and sent them back to the kitchen multiple times in protest. The chef, George Crum, allegedly became annoyed with Cornelius, so he sliced the potatoes much thinner than he usually would, deep fried, and salted them. This inadvertently led to potato chips, and the customer was finally satisfied. Because of this, some Americans called potato chips Saratoga Chips.

The restaurant was built by Cary Moon in 1853 on a bluff overlooking the lake, and soon after it "displace[d] all other destinations as the late-afternoon goal of Saratoga Springs' daily carriage parade." Initially Catherine "Aunt Kate" Weeks and her brother George Crum shared the cooking duties. Crum later left to start his own restaurant in Malta at the south end of the lake.

The Lake House burned in 1893, but was rebuilt. There are conflicting reports, but apparently Moon continued to operate it until his death in 1895.

In 1907, the Lake House was sold to Edward J. Heffernan. In 1908, it burned a second time and was again rebuilt. In 1926, the restaurant burned a third time. In the 1930s, the property was sold to local personality Louis A. "Doc" Farone, the owner of Riley's and Newman's lake houses and an associate of underworld figure Meyer Lansky. Farone built a smaller restaurant on the property and rented it to a series of managers.

In 1981, the restaurant reopened as "Moon's", changed hands, and finally burned a fourth and final time in 1983. A private house was later constructed on the site.

In 2006, Tilman Achtnich filmed a special on the potato chip Die Kartoffelchips des Mister Crum (The Potato Chips of Mister Crum) for the German television network SWR. Scenes included the site of Moon's, now only foundations, and Crum's restaurant in Malta, New York.
