= Saratoga Lake =

Lake in Saratoga County, New York, USA

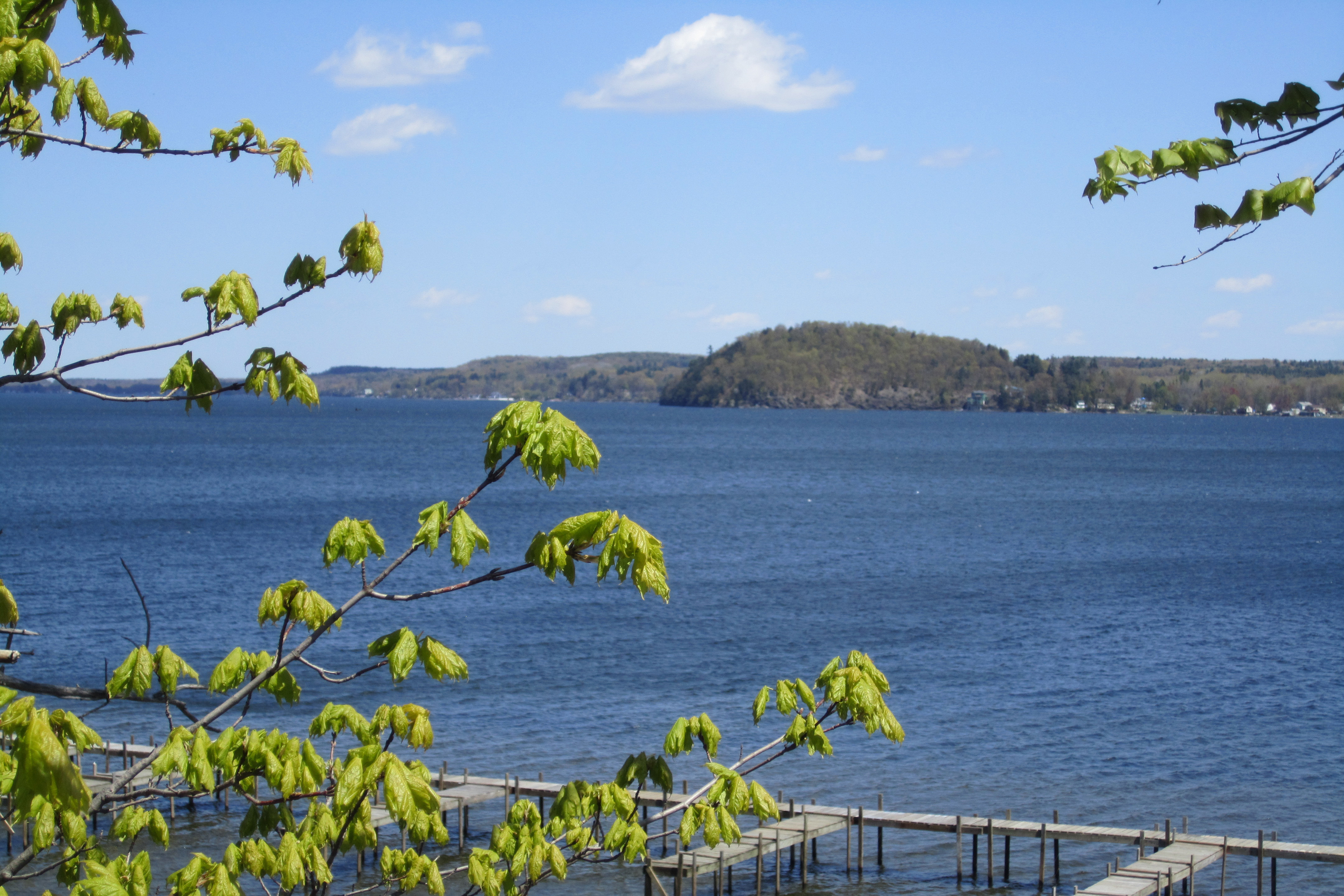
- Saratoga Lake from the southwest with a view of Snake Hill

- Location within New York Location within the United States
- Location: Saratoga County, New York
- Coordinates: 43°01′12″N 73°44′24″W
- Primary inflows: Kayaderosseras Creek
- Primary outflows: Fish Creek
- Catchment area: 244 sq mi (630 km^{2})
- Basin countries: United States
- Max. length: 4.5 mi (7.2 km)
- Max. width: 1.5 mi (2.4 km)
- Surface area: 6.3 sq mi (16 km^{2})
- Average depth: 25 ft (7.6 m)
- Max. depth: 95 ft (29 m)
- Water volume: 33×10^{9} US gal (120×10^{6} m^{3})
- Residence time: 5 months
- Shore length^{1}: 23 mi (37 km)
- Surface elevation: 200 ft (61 m)
- Frozen: usually unfreezes mid-late March or early-mid April
- ^{1} Shore length is not a well-defined measure.

Saratoga Lake is in the eastern part of Saratoga County, New York. The lake is approximately 4.5 miles (7.2 km) long, about 1.5 miles (2.4 km) wide at its widest point, and about 95 feet (29 m) deep.

The lake is bordered by the city of Saratoga Springs on the northwest, the town of Malta on the southwest, the town of Stillwater on the southeast, and the town of Saratoga on the northeast. New York State Route 9P runs along the southern end and eastern side of the lake, and then crosses its outlet in the north.

The lake's major source is Kayaderosseras Creek, which enters the lake from the northwest, and the outlet is Fish Creek, which exits the lake from the north and flows into the Hudson River at Schuylerville.

== Fishing ==
Fish species present in the lake are walleye, smallmouth bass, black crappie, yellow perch, redbreast sunfish, bluegill, northern pike, tiger muskie, largemouth bass, carp, pumpkinseed sunfish, and brown bullhead. There is a state-owned hard surface ramp boat launch off Union Avenue on the north shore.

== History ==
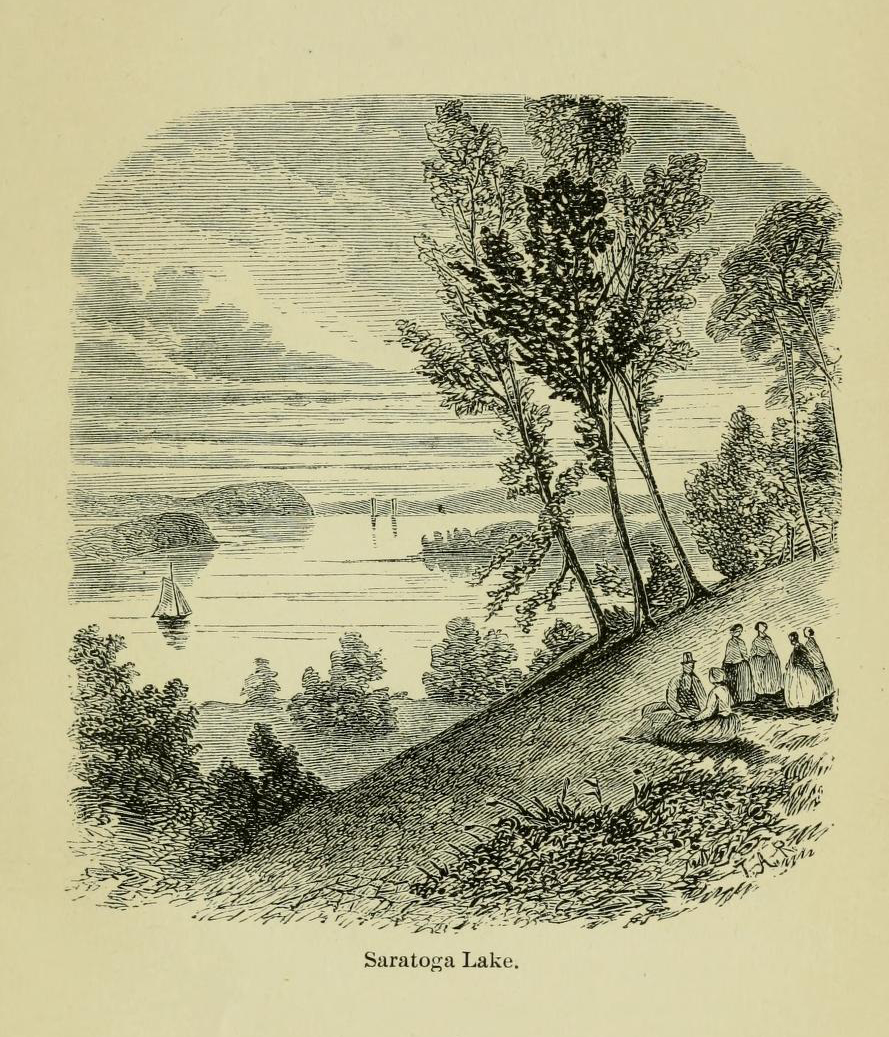
View of Saratoga Lake from the north end in the vicinity of Moon's Lake House about 1867

The name "Saratoga" is said to derive from the native Se-rach-ta-gue, meaning "hillside country of the great river"; however, several completely different interpretations have been proposed.

Archeological evidence shows Native American occupation dating back to 7000 BC.

The first European to visit the lake may have been the Jesuit Isaac Jogues in 1642. The Saint Isaac Jogues Chapel, on the lake in Stillwater, commemorates his mission.

=== Rowing ===
The sport of rowing has a long history on Saratoga Lake, especially along Fish Creek. "In July 1874, the Rowing Association of American Colleges hosted the University Race for the Championship at Saratoga." Columbia won what was reported as "the most exciting race ever witnessed." Other participants were Wesleyan, Harvard, Williams, Cornell, Dartmouth, Princeton, Trinity, and Yale. Competitions were held annually thereafter for several years. The tradition was revived in 1986 with the first Head of the Fish Regatta, which by 2010 had grown to be "the second largest regatta in the country, by volume of boats entered."

== Places on Saratoga Lake ==
The north end of the lake, around Fish Creek, has a public boat launch and many private marinas, while the middle and southern areas are less densely developed.

- Brown's Beach, Stillwater — public beach, restaurant and bed and breakfast
- Salvi Aquatic Boat Rentals, Saratoga Lake Boat Rentals — located on north side of the lake
- Lees Park Campground — RV campground and marina located on north side of the lake
- Crum's Place, Malta Avenue Ext., Malta — former restaurant owned by one of the various people reputed to be the inventor of the potato chip
- Fish Creek, Saratoga — public boat launch
- Fish Creek Marina, Saratoga — kayak and paddleboard rentals
- Moon's Lake House, Saratoga Springs (now razed)
- Riley's Cove (Chinatown), Malta
- Saratoga Lake Sailing Club, Manning's Cove, Malta
- Saratoga Lake Motel, Saratoga
- Snake Hill, Stillwater — an outcrop on the east side of the lake named for timber rattlesnakes that denned there until their extirpation in the mid-1800s; this was the only known rattlesnake den to have ever occurred in Saratoga County. The county placed a bounty on rattlesnakes from 1948 to 1950, after the snakes were extirpated.
- South Shore Marina, Malta
- White Sulphur Spring hotel (now razed), Stillwater

== In popular culture ==
Episode 5 of the Twilight Zone, "Walking Distance", has a reference to renting a cottage on Saratoga Lake.
